= Anshan-class destroyer =

Chinese navy ship type

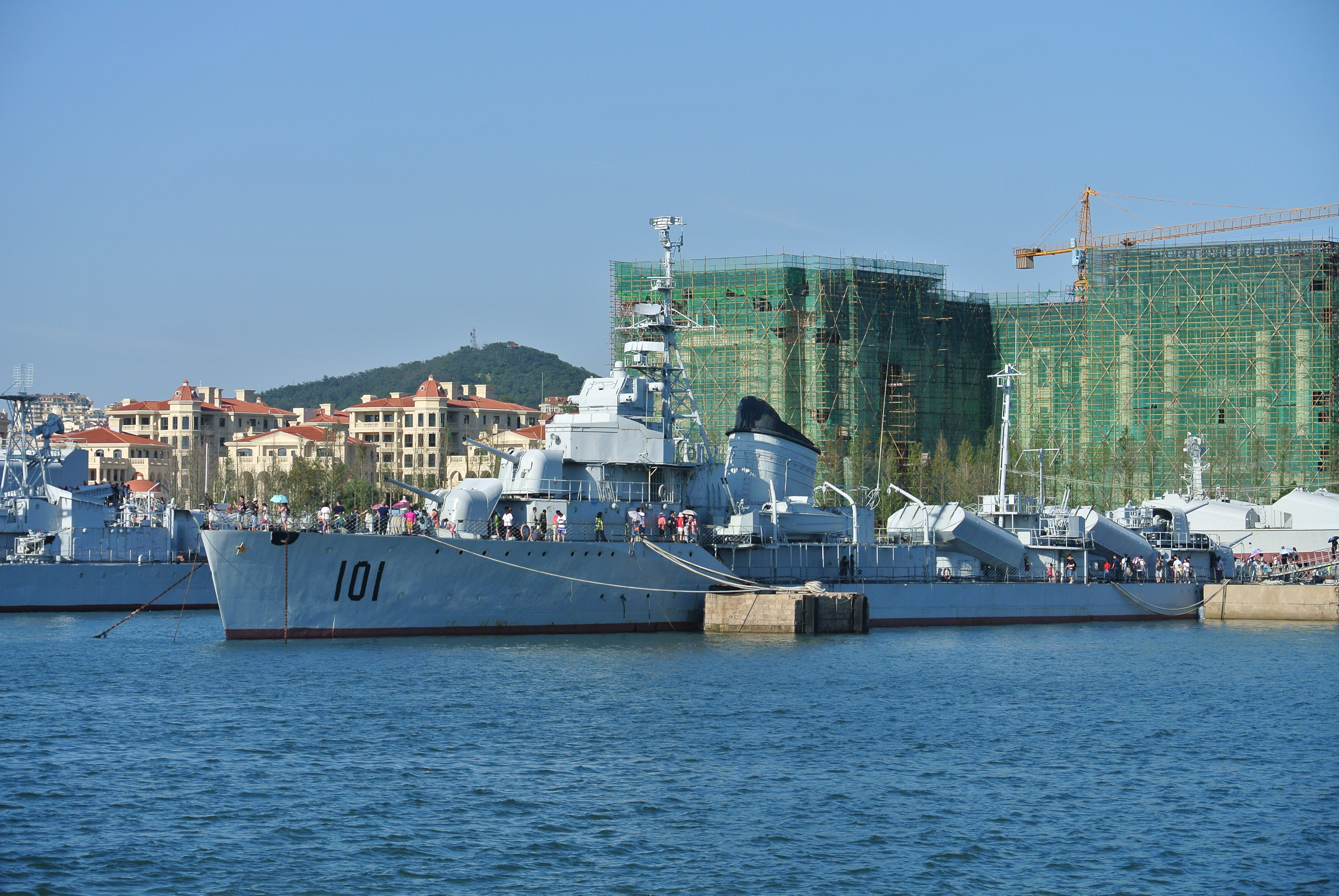
- Anshan as museum ship on 24 August 2017

Class overview
- Name: Anshan class
- Builders: Shipyard No. 198 (Andre Marti (South)), Nikolayev; Shipyard No. 202 (Dalzavod), Vladivostok; Shipyard No. 199, Komsomolsk-on-Amur
- Operators: People's Liberation Army Navy
- Succeeded by: Type 051 destroyer
- Built: 1936-1942
- In commission: 1954-1992
- Completed: 4
- Retired: 4
- Scrapped: 2
- Preserved: 2

General characteristics (after 1970s modernization)
- Type: Destroyer / Guided-missile destroyer
- Displacement: 1,660 long tons (1,690 t) standard; 2,040 long tons (2,070 t) full load
- Length: 112.8 m (370 ft)
- Beam: 10.2 m (33 ft)
- Draught: 4 m (13 ft)
- Installed power: 48,000 shaft horsepower (36 MW)
- Propulsion: 2 × geared steam turbines; 3 × drum boilers; 2 × shafts
- Speed: 32 knots (59 km/h)
- Range: 2,670 nautical miles (4,940 km) at 19 knots (35 km/h)
- Complement: 205
- Sensors & processing systems: Mina FCS; "Cross Bird" air-search radar; "High Sieve" air/surface-search radar; "Square Tie" surface-search radar; "Ball End" and "Fin Curve" navigational radar; Pegas-2M active sonar
- Armament: 2 × twin HY-2 SSM launchers; 4 × 130 mm (5 in)/50 guns; 4 × twin 37 mm (1.5 in) guns; 2 × depth charge racks and launchers; 60 × mines

The Anshan-class destroyers were the People's Liberation Army Navy's (PLAN) first destroyers. They were ex-Soviet Gnevny-class destroyers purchased in the 1950s. The Chinese later added HY-2 anti-ship missiles and removed some of the torpedo tubes, and redesignated as Type 6607. All four ships of the class had been stricken by 1992.

== Design ==
The class has a length of 112.8 m (370 ft) with length between perpendiculars of 109 m (358 ft), a beam of 10.2 m (33 ft), with a draught of 4 m (13 ft), and their displacement were 1,660 long tons (1,690 t) standard and 2,040 long tons (2,070 t) at full load. The ships was powered by two sets of Tosi geared steam turbines with three drum boilers, with total power output of 48,000 shaft horsepower (36 MW) distributed in two shafts. Anshan class has a maximum speed of 32 knots (59 km/h), with range of 2,670 nautical miles (4,940 km) while cruising at 19 knots (35 km/h) or 850 nautical miles (1,570 km) at 32 knots (59 km/h). The ships has a complement of 205 personnel, including 15 officers.

The class were initially armed with four 130 mm (5 in)/50 caliber B13 Pattern 1936 guns in four turrets, two 76.2 mm (3 in)/55 34-K guns in two turrets, four 37 mm/63 70-K guns in single-mounts, one Oerlikon 20 mm/70 autocannon, and two triple-tube 533-millimetre (21 in) torpedo tubes. In 1971–1974, all ships were modernized by replacing the two torpedo tubes with two twin HY-2 surface-to-surface missile launchers, the four Soviet single-mount 37 mm/63 70-K guns were replaced with four Chinese twin-mount 37 mm/63 Type 61 guns, and removal of the 76 mm guns and 20 mm autocannon. The ships also equipped with two projectors and two racks for depth charges and can carry up to 60 naval mines.

The ships electronics and sensors consisted of Mina fire-control system, Gius-2 (NATO code: "Cross Bird") air-search radar, "High Sieve" air/surface-search radar, "Square Tie" surface-search radar, "Ball End" and "Fin Curve" navigational radar, and Pegas-2M active sonar.

== History ==
After 1949 the PLAN negotiated with Britain through Hong Kong to buy some second-hand ships and boats but was unable to do so due to the Korean War. As a result, the PLAN turned to the Soviet Union to buy four worn-out destroyers. The purchase was made on 4 June 1953, with prices equivalent to 17 tons of gold each at the time.

The Anshan-class ships were withdrawn from active service by the 1990s, but retained two ships as museum ships (Anshan and Changchun). The PLAN retains ownership of the ships through PLAN funded institutions.

Fushun and Taiyuan were scrapped in 1989 and 2026 respectively.

== Ships in class ==
Pennant No.	Name	Former name	Builder	Laid down	Launched	Commissioned	Status
101	Anshan (鞍山)	ex-Rekordny (Рекордный)	Shipyard No. 202 (Dalzavod), Vladivostok	25 September 1936 / July 1937	6 April 1939	24 October 1954	Museum ship in Qingdao from April 1992.
102	Fushun (撫順)	ex-Rezky (Резкий)	Shipyard No. 202 (Dalzavod), Vladivostok	5 May 1936 / 20 August 1938	29 April 1940	24 October 1954	Scrapped 1989.
103	Changchun (长春)	ex-Reshitelny (Решительный)	Shipyard No. 199, Komsomolsk-on-Amur	23 August 1936 / 23 August 1937	30 April 1940	6 July 1955	Museum ship in Rushan from 1990.
104	Taiyuan (太原)	ex-Retivy (Ретивый)	Shipyard No. 199, Komsomolsk-on-Amur	23 August 1936 / 29 July 1937	27 September 1939	6 July 1955	Stationary training ship for Dalian Naval Academy from September 1991. Scrapped 2026
