= Soviet destroyer Baku =

Soviet Navy's Leningrad-class cruiser

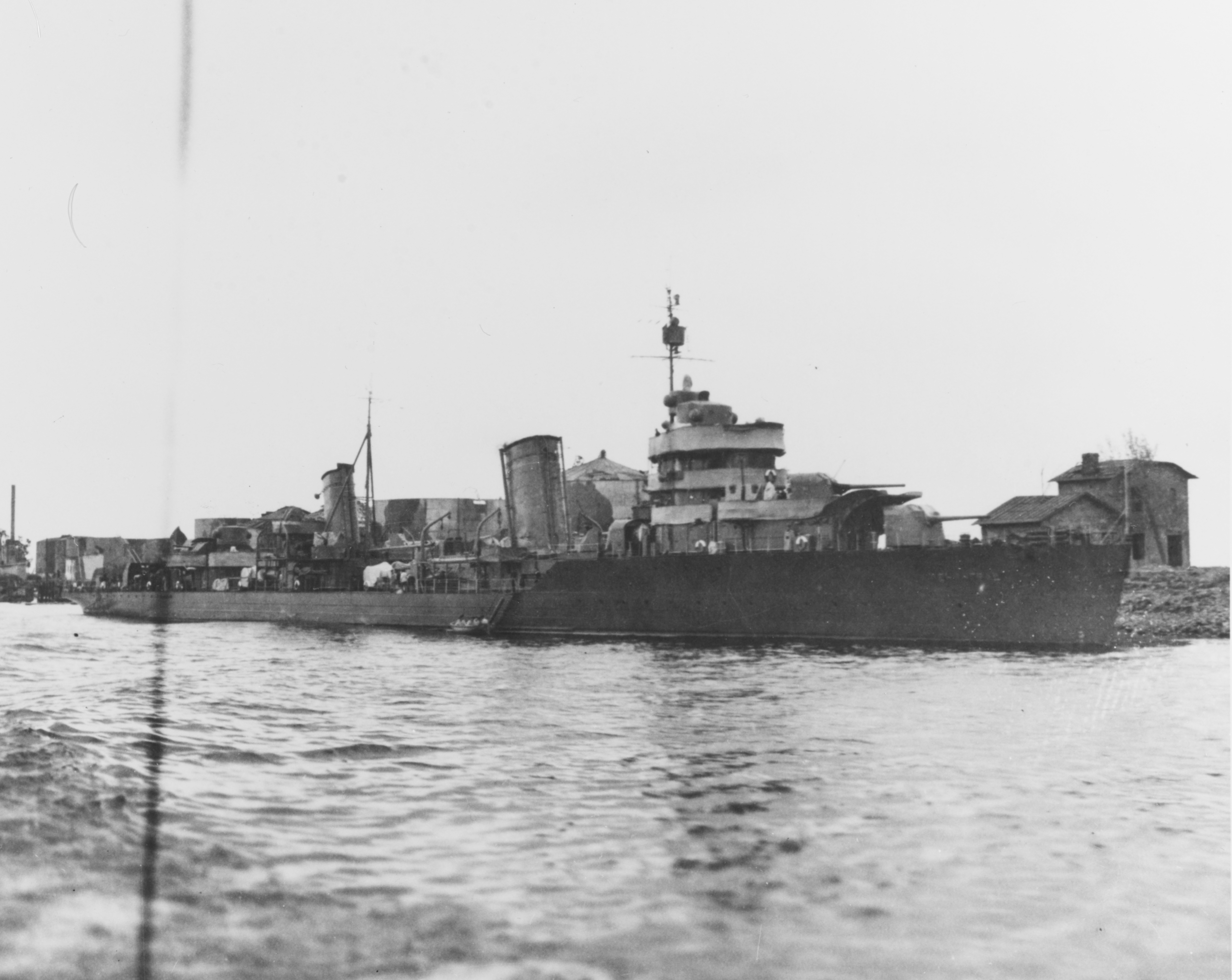
- Unknown Leningrad-class destroyer in Leningrad, June 1944

History

Soviet Union
- Name: Baku
- Namesake: Baku
- Ordered: 2nd Five-Year Plan
- Builder: Shipyard No. 199, Komsomolsk-on-Amur
- Yard number: 267
- Laid down: 10 March 1936 as Kiev
- Launched: 25 July 1938
- Decommissioned: 18 April 1958
- In service: 27 December 1939
- Renamed: Ordzhonikidze, 25 July 1938; Sergo Ordzhonikidze, 27 December 1939; Baku, 25 September 1940
- Reclassified: As experimental ship, 17 February 1956; As target ship, 18 April 1958; As accommodation ship, 2 June 1959
- Stricken: 30 July 1963
- Honours and awards: Order of the Red Banner, 6 March 1945
- Fate: Scrapped, 1964

General characteristics (as built)
- Class & type: Leningrad-class destroyer leader
- Displacement: 2,350 long tons (2,390 t) (standard); 2,680 long tons (2,720 t) (full load)
- Length: 127.5 m (418 ft 4 in) (o/a)
- Beam: 11.7 m (38 ft 5 in)
- Draft: 4.06 m (13 ft 4 in)
- Installed power: 3 Three-drum boilers; 66,000 shp (49,000 kW)
- Propulsion: 3 shafts; 3 geared steam turbines
- Speed: 40 knots (74 km/h; 46 mph)
- Range: 2,100 nmi (3,900 km; 2,400 mi) at 20 knots (37 km/h; 23 mph)
- Complement: 250 (311 wartime)
- Sensors & processing systems: Arktur hydrophones
- Armament: 5 × single 130 mm (5.1 in) guns; 2 × single 76.2 mm (3 in) AA guns; 2 × single 45 mm (1.8 in) AA guns; 2 × quadruple 533 mm (21 in) torpedo tubes; 68–115 mines; 52 depth charges

Baku (Russian: Баку) was one of six Leningrad-class destroyer leaders built for the Soviet Navy during the 1930s, one of the three Project 38 variants. Completed in late 1939, the ship was assigned to the Pacific Fleet. About a year after the German invasion of Russia in June 1941, she was ordered to join the Northern Fleet, sailing through the Arctic Ocean. Together with several other destroyers, Baku left the Soviet Far East in July 1942 and arrived off Murmansk three months later where she began escorting convoys, mostly in the White and Barents Seas. The ship was badly damaged in a storm that sank another Soviet destroyer in November and was under repair for several months. Baku spent most of the rest of the war on convoy escort duties, although she did bombard several German-occupied towns during the Petsamo–Kirkenes Offensive of October 1944. The ship and her crew were awarded the Order of the Red Banner in early 1945 for their performance during the war.

After the war, she was refitted and rejoined the Northern Fleet in 1946. For the next several years she exercised during the warm months and was put in reserve during winter. The following year she starred in a movie about a fictional destroyer during the war. Baku began a lengthy overhaul in 1948 that lasted until 1954. Upon its completion she was used for experimental work and was formally reclassified as an experimental ship two years later. Baku was converted into a target ship in 1958, but was hulked as a depot ship a few weeks later. She became an accommodation ship in 1959 and was finally struck from the Navy List in 1963 and scrapped the following year.

== Design and description ==
Impressed by the French large destroyer (contre-torpilleur) designs such as the Vauquelin class of the early 1930s, the Soviets designed their own version. The Leningrads had an overall length of 127.5 meters (418 ft 4 in) and were 122 meters (400 ft 3 in) long at the waterline. The ships had a beam of 11.7 meters (38 ft 5 in), and a draft of 4.06 meters (13 ft 4 in) at deep load. Built in two batches, the second batch (Project 38) displaced 2,350 long tons (2,390 t) at standard load and 2,680 long tons (2,720 t) at deep load. Their crew numbered 250 officers and sailors in peacetime and 311 in wartime. The ships had three geared steam turbines, each driving one propeller, designed to produce 66,000 shaft horsepower (49,000 kW) using steam from three three-drum boilers which was intended to give them a maximum speed of 40 knots (74 km/h; 46 mph). The Leningrads carried enough fuel oil to give them a range of 2,100 nautical miles (3,900 km; 2,400 mi) at 20 knots (37 km/h; 23 mph).

As built, the Leningrad-class ships mounted five 130-millimeter (5.1 in) B-13 guns in two pairs of superfiring single mounts fore and aft of the superstructure and another mount between the bridge and the forward funnel. The guns were protected by gun shields. Anti-aircraft defense was provided by a pair of 76.2-millimeter (3 in) 34-K AA guns in single mounts on the aft superstructure and a pair of 45-millimeter (1.8 in) 21-K AA guns mounted on either side of the bridge as well as six 12.7-millimeter (0.50 in) DShK machine guns. They carried eight 533 mm (21.0 in) torpedo tubes in two rotating quadruple mounts fore and aft of the rear funnel; each tube was provided with a reload. The ships could also carry a maximum of either 68 or 115 mines and 52 depth charges. They were fitted with a set of Arktur hydrophones for anti-submarine detection.

=== Modifications ===
In 1944 Baku was fitted with four depth charge launchers. Before leaving the Pacific Fleet, she exchanged her two 21-K mounts for ten 37-millimeter (1.5 in) 70-K AA guns. She received a British Type 128 asdic system during the war and was initially fitted with a Type 286M surface-search radar, but this was replaced by a Type 284 gunnery radar and an American SF-1 radar by 1945. After the war, all of the 76- and 37-millimeter guns were replaced by a dozen water-cooled V-11M versions of the 70-K gun in twin mounts. During the 1950s, the radars were replaced by Top Bow, EWS Top, Plum Jar and Ball End radars and the pole foremast was replaced by a tripod mast to support them.

== Construction and career ==
=== Construction and Pacific service ===
The ship that became Baku was originally named Kiev, after the Ukrainian capital. Major components for Kiev were laid down at Shipyard No. 198 (Marti South) in Nikolayev on 5 January 1935 as yard number 267, railed to the station of Pokrovka near Khabarovsk, and shipped by barge down the Amur to the new Shipyard No. 199 at Komsomolsk-on-Amur, Siberia, for assembly under the supervision of experienced shipbuilder Konstantin Terletsky and shipyard chief engineer Pavel Goynkis. The ship was again laid down on 10 March 1936, with its construction accelerated by Goynkis' usage of a horizontal slipway for construction and the installation of machinery. Launched and renamed Ordzhonikidze on 25 July 1938 in honor of the Soviet politician, the still-incomplete destroyer leader was ordered towed to Vladivostok for completion at Shipyard No. 202 (Dalzavod) to build her faster.

Ordzhonikidze was towed from Shipyard No. 199 downriver to Nikolayevsk-on-Amur and then Sovetskaya Gavan beginning on 27 September, where some components were installed and the ship was prepared for towing by sea. She reached Vladivostok on 25 October and upon completion underwent a series of trials which concluded on 11 December, after which she entered service on 27 December 1939 and was simultaneously renamed Sergo Ordzhonikidze; her construction cost 33.2 million Rbls. Following additional tests and combat training, the destroyer leader, now the largest and fastest ship of the Pacific Fleet, was assigned to the latter's 1st Destroyer Division on 6 May 1940. In order to reuse the name for a Kirov-class cruiser, the vessel was renamed Baku, after the Azeri capital, on 25 September. After Operation Barbarossa began in June 1941, Baku, commanded by Kapitan 3 ranga (Captain 3rd Rank) Boris Belyayev from 1940, laid minefields and escorted transports, receiving a LFTI degaussing system in early October.

=== Voyage to the Northern Fleet ===
As a result of the weakness of the Northern Fleet and the importance of the Arctic convoys of World War II, Stavka decided to transfer several modern ships from the Pacific to the Northern Fleet in May 1942; this was ordered by People's Commissar of the Navy Nikolay Kuznetsov on 18 June. Along with Baku, three Gnevny-class destroyers – Razumny, Razyaryonny, and Revnostny – were planned to be transferred to the Northern Fleet as the Expedition of Special Purpose (EON)-18, the first time that Soviet warships would use the Northern Sea Route to steam from east to west. The expedition was accompanied by three icebreakers, three oil tankers, and two transports for material supplies, and was prepared in great secrecy, using the pretense of a relocation to Kamchatka. To strengthen her hull against ice, Baku was drydocked at Dalzavod in June, where 100-millimeter-thick (3.9 in) wooden beams lined with 3–5-millimeter (0.12–0.20 in) sheet iron were attached to her sides; the sheet iron was 14–15-millimeter (0.55–0.59 in) thick where the beams were placed vertically and 500 millimeters (19.7 in) on the stern. Other changes included the movement of the degaussing coils to the interior of the hull, the installation of an additional fire extinguisher for the boiler rooms, the replacement of her regular propellers with special reinforced propellers for ice travel, and the replacement of the 45 mm 21-K anti-aircraft guns with 37 mm 70-K weapons.

Due to overloading and the changes made, the seaworthiness of Baku was found to have been reduced during a trial run in the Vostok Bay, but the ship was still considered ready for the voyage. Baku and three other destroyers departed Vladivostok on 15 July 1942, passing through the Strait of Tartary before stopping for replenishment at De-Kastri on 17 July. They continued towards the Sea of Okhotsk, but Revnostny collided with a transport in the Sakhalin Gulf on the next day, forcing the expedition to halt until the order from Kuznetsov to continue without the former was received on 19 July. While passing through the First Kuril Strait on 22 July, the expedition was spotted by Japanese warships, which tracked them to Avachinsky Bay. On the evening of the same day the destroyers put in at Tarya Bay in the Petropavlovsk-Kamchatsky naval base for supplies. They steamed for Chukotka and entered Provideniya Bay on 30 July, where an icebreaker, tanker, and transport relieved the previous support ships. The expedition rested there for two weeks to check for malfunctions before departing on 14 August, encountering ice for the first time on the next day. The movement of the expedition became increasingly difficult as the ice increased, and it passed the Long Strait, stopping at Pevek in early September when Razumny suffered mechanical problems. Baku and the remaining destroyer left the latter behind and entered Ambarchik Bay on 14 September, where ice forced them to slow to an average of 3 knots (5.6 km/h; 3.5 mph).

Under these conditions, the expedition passed through the East Siberian Sea to the Laptev Sea. They stopped at Tiksi on 17 September for a day to replenish supplies and conduct minor repairs, with Baku taking Razyaryonny in tow due to a bent propeller on the latter. Preceded by a fresh icebreaker, the ships left the port on the next day. In response to the Kriegsmarine's Operation Wunderland, they had their guns fully manned while passing through the Vilkitsky Strait. The ships anchored at Dikson on 24 September, where minor malfunctions were fixed aboard Baku although Razyaryonny's propeller could not be repaired. The expedition resumed on 9 October, meeting a fierce storm in the Kara Sea. It met ships from the Northern Fleet in the Yugorsky Shar Strait on the next day, and the expedition, whose destroyer Razumny had by now caught up, with four icebreakers and 22 transports, entered Kola Bay at Vaenga on 14 October; Belyayev was awarded the Order of the Patriotic War, 1st class, for his leadership.

=== World War II service with the Northern Fleet ===
At Vaenga, Baku was docked for two weeks to remove the hull-strengthening beams and plating, replace the ice-strengthened propellers which had proven detrimental to travel, restore the degaussing coils, fit anti-aircraft and anti-submarine weapons, and receive a camouflage paint scheme. Meanwhile, on 20 October she became the leader of the 1st Division of the newly created Northern Fleet destroyer brigade. In the last days of October, Baku escorted transports into the White Sea and on 29 October conducted a shore bombardment with Razumny in support of a Soviet attack. The following month, Baku and the destroyer Sokrushitelny escorted Convoy QP 15 from Arkhangelsk to the Barents Sea from 17 to 20 November when they encountered a severe storm. The high waves and strong winds caused Sokrushitelny to break in half, while Baku was severely damaged when multiple compartments were flooded and water put two boilers out of action, creating a list 40 degrees to port. The latter was ordered to assist Sokrushitelny but could not find her in the storm, and running low on fuel returned to the base for repairs on 22 November; these lasted until 15 January 1943.

In response to a radio intelligence report of a German convoy of two transports with a destroyer and two smaller escorts steaming east from Tromsø, Baku and Razumny made a night sortie on 20 January. They engaged the German minelayer Skagerrak with the minesweepers M303 and M322, and subchasers UJ1104 and UJ1105 off Cape Makkaur. After closing the range, Baku fired four torpedoes at what the Soviets believed was the lead transport, all of which missed. As her lookouts reported explosions, the latter was believed sunk, and both Soviet warships turned their guns against what was believed to be the second transport, without result. The German vessels returned fire without damaging Baku, and the engagement ended after seven minutes when visibility deteriorated, allowing the Soviet ships to retreat behind a smokescreen laid by Razumny. The engagement was claimed as a victory in Soviet propaganda, though Northern Fleet commander-in-chief Vitse-admiral (Vice Admiral) Arseny Golovko concluded that the "destroyers should have been more aggressive."

After the engagement, both ships escorted four transports into Kola Bay on 2–3 February. On 27–28 March, Baku and the destroyers Gromky and Grozny sortied off the Arctic coast of Norway in unsuccessful searches for German shipping under Golovko's command. With Grozny and five smaller vessels, she escorted three Allied merchants from Kola Bay to Arkhangelsk on 15 May. Baku, Grozny, Gromky and the destroyer Gremyashchiy escorted icebreakers through the White Sea into the Barents Sea between 8 and 20 June; she returned to Vaenga and was sent to Arkhangelsk on 22 June. From July through mid-November, Baku helped to escort local convoys between Arkhangelsk and the Kola Peninsula. She spent at least part of the winter under repair to reinforce her hull.

The ship remained on local convoy duty in June–November 1944, interrupted by a brief time escorting Convoy JW 59 shortly before it reached Murmansk on 24–25 August and a bombardment of the Norwegian towns of Vardø and Vadsø on 26 October, during the Petsamo–Kirkenes Offensive. From 6 to 8 December she participated in an anti-submarine operation under the flag of squadron commander Kontr-admiral (Rear Admiral) Vitaly Fokin together with the destroyers Gremyashchiy, Razumny, Derzky, Zhivuchny, and Doblestny to prevent German submarines from attacking westbound Convoy RA 62 along with other Allied escorts. Baku resumed escorting local convoys in January 1945. On 6 March she and her crew were awarded the Order of the Red Banner for their "exemplary performance of combat missions" and the "courage and heroism" of the crew. As the war wound down, she was no longer needed for escort duty and was put into Rosta for a refit on 29 April; due to the lack of facilities there the shipyard could only conduct a medium-level refit.

=== Postwar ===
Following the completion of her refit, Baku reentered service on 17 April 1946. For the next several years, she participated in training with the rest of the fleet during the two summer months, which included shallow-water torpedo firing. The ship was laid up during the winter months, and portrayed the title Northern Fleet destroyer in the 1947 war film Story of the "Furious" (Povest o 'Neistovom'). She participated in exercises in August of that year. On 29 October 1948 the ship began a major refit at Shipyard No. 402 in Molotovsk, which was lengthened by the technical modernization conducted by the then-inexperienced shipyard workers. While refitting, Baku was reclassified as a destroyer on 12 January 1949 and was assigned to the 178th Destroyer Brigade.

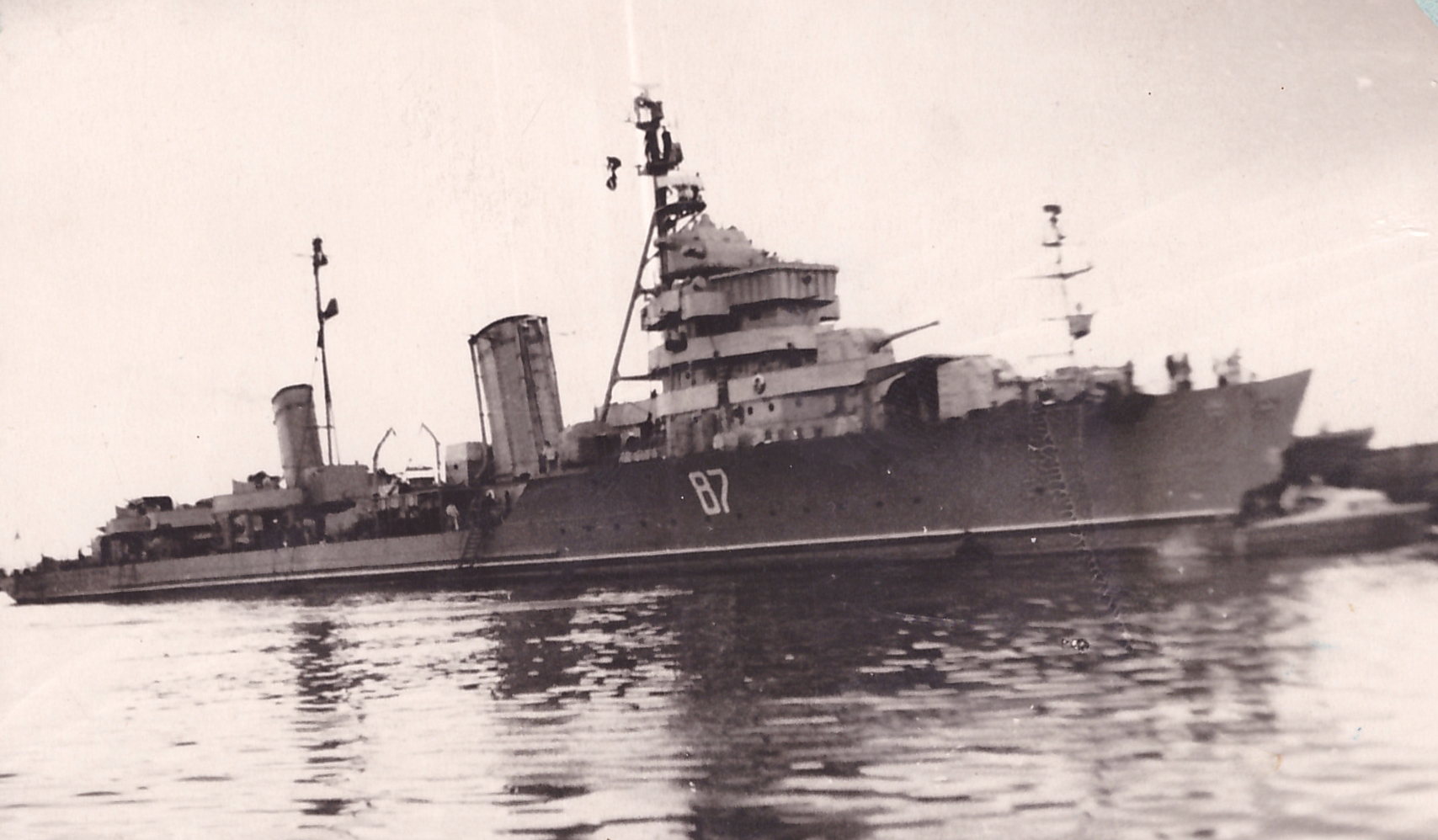
Baku in Severodvinsk, 1954–1956

Upon completion of her more-than-five-year refit and testing, Baku was accepted for transfer to the Baltic Fleet in July 1954, but instead was transferred to the White Sea Flotilla to test new ships in the White and Barents Seas. She was reclassified as an experimental vessel on 17 February 1956, then disarmed and converted into the target ship TsL-31 on 18 April 1958. The latter period was brief, however, as she was again converted into the unpowered depot ship PB-32 on 31 May. After being converted into a barracks ship, PKZ-171, on 2 June 1959, Baku was struck on 30 July 1963 and subsequently scrapped in mid-1964.

== Bibliography ==
- Breyer, Siegfried (1992). Soviet Warship Development: Volume 1: 1917–1937. London: Conway Maritime Press. ISBN 0-85177-604-3.
- Budzbon, Przemysław (1980). "Soviet Union". In Chesneau, Roger (ed.). Conway's All the World's Fighting Ships 1922–1946. Greenwich, UK: Conway Maritime Press. pp. 318–346. ISBN 0-85177-146-7.
- Budzbon, Przemysław; Radziemski, Jan & Twardowski, Marek (2022). Warships of the Soviet Fleets 1939–1945. Vol. I: Major Combatants. Annapolis, Maryland: Naval Institute Press. ISBN 978-1-68247-877-6.
- Hill, Alexander (2018). Soviet Destroyers of World War II. New Vanguard. Vol. 256. Oxford, UK: Osprey Publishing. ISBN 978-1-4728-2256-7.
- Kachur, Pavel (2008). "Гончие псы" Красного флота. "Ташкент", "Баку", "Ленинград" [Hounds of the Red Fleet: Tashkent, Baku, Leningrad] (in Russian). Moscow: Yauza/Eksmo. ISBN 978-5-699-31614-4.
- O'Hara, Vincent (2011). The German Fleet at War, 1939–1945 (eBook ed.). Annapolis, Maryland: Naval Institute Press. ISBN 978-1-61251-397-3.
- Rohwer, Jürgen (2005). Chronology of the War at Sea 1939–1945: The Naval History of World War Two (Third Revised ed.). Annapolis, Maryland: Naval Institute Press. ISBN 1-59114-119-2.
- Rohwer, Jürgen & Monakov, Mikhail S. (2001). Stalin's Ocean-Going Fleet. London: Frank Cass. ISBN 0-7146-4895-7.
