= Ship Retivy =

Retivy (Russian: Ретивый), also spelled Revtivyy or Retiviy, is the name of the following ships of the Imperial Russian Navy, Soviet Navy, and Russian Navy:

- Russian destroyer Retivy, a Sokol-class destroyer launched in 1900 and decommissioned in 1922
- Soviet destroyer Retivy, a Gnevny-class destroyer launched in 1939, transferred to China in 1955, and a museum ship/moored training ship since 1991
- Soviet frigate Retivy, a Krivak-class frigate in commission 1976–1995
- Russian corvette Retiviy, the original name of the Steregushchiy-class corvette Merkury, commissioned in 2021
- Russian corvette Retiviy, a Gremyashchiy-class corvette laid down in 2023 and under construction
