= Soviet destroyer Rekordny =

Soviet and Chinese warship

Coordinates: 36.0540375°N 120.3213550°E

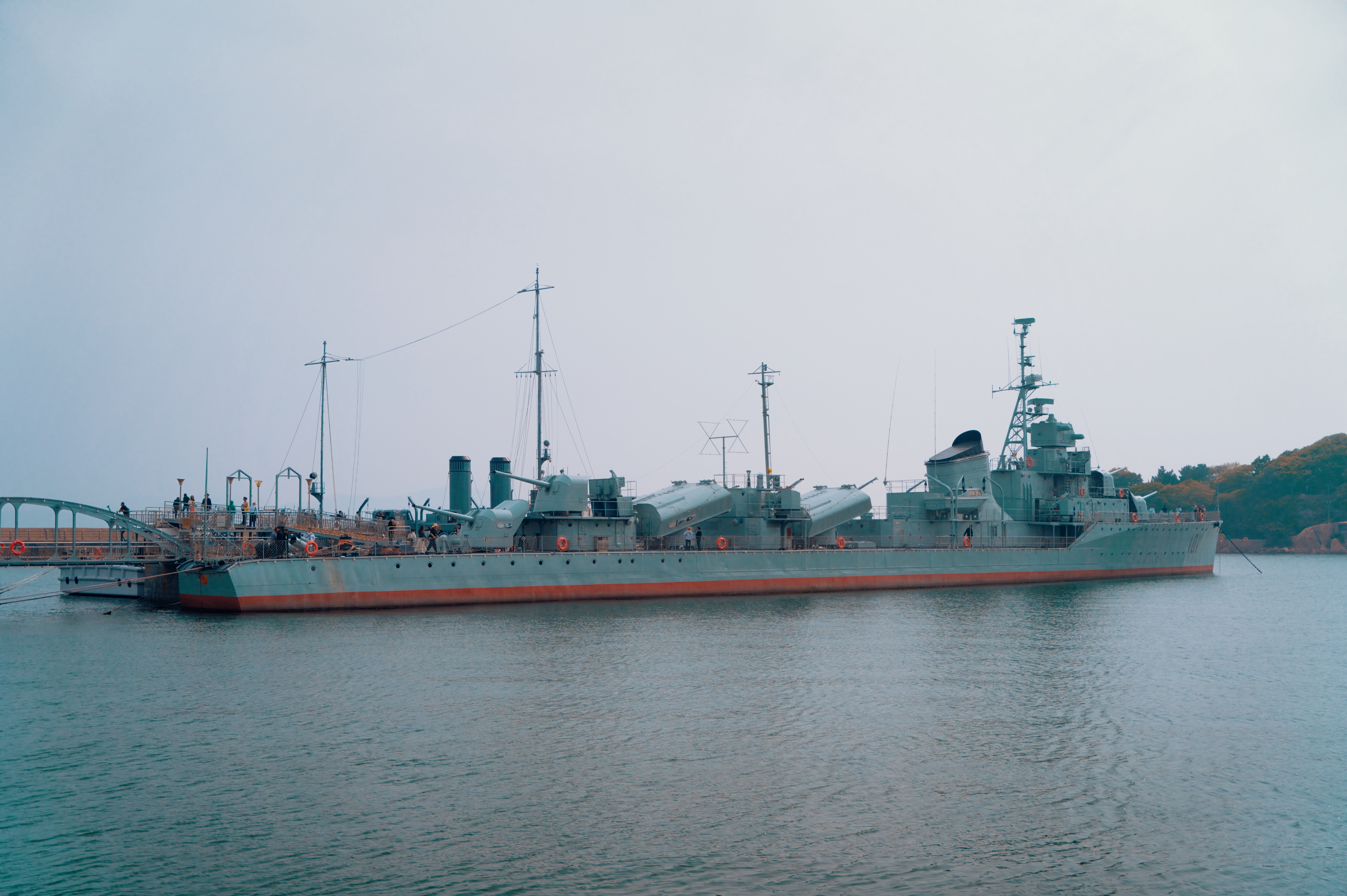
- Rekordny was renamed Anshan in Chinese service and now preserved at the Naval Museum of China in Qingdao

History

Soviet Union
- Name: Rekordny
- Ordered: 2nd Five-Year Plan
- Builder: Shipyard No. 198 (Andre Marti (South)), Nikolayev; Shipyard No. 202 (Dalzavod), Vladivostok
- Laid down: 25 September 1936; July 1937
- Launched: 6 April 1939
- Completed: 9 January 1941
- Fate: Transferred to the People's Liberation Army Navy, 6 July 1955

People's Republic of China
- Name: Anshan (Chinese: 鞍山舰; pinyin: Ānshān Jiàn)
- Namesake: Anshan City, Liaoning Province
- Acquired: 6 July 1955
- Reclassified: As a missile destroyer, 1974
- Stricken: 1986
- Fate: Became museum ship, 24 April 1992

General characteristics (Gnevny as completed, 1938)
- Class & type: Gnevny-class destroyer
- Displacement: 1,612 t (1,587 long tons) (standard)
- Length: 112.8 m (370 ft 1 in) (o/a)
- Beam: 10.2 m (33 ft 6 in)
- Draft: 4.8 m (15 ft 9 in)
- Installed power: 3 water-tube boilers; 48,000 shp (36,000 kW)
- Propulsion: 2 shafts; 2 geared steam turbines
- Speed: 38 knots (70 km/h; 44 mph)
- Range: 2,720 nmi (5,040 km; 3,130 mi) at 19 knots (35 km/h; 22 mph)
- Complement: 197 (236 wartime)
- Sensors & processing systems: Mars hydrophone
- Armament: 4 × single 130 mm (5.1 in) guns; 2 × single 76.2 mm (3 in) AA guns; 2 × single 45 mm (1.8 in) AA guns; 2 × single 12.7 mm (0.50 in) AA machineguns; 2 × triple 533 mm (21 in) torpedo tubes; 60–96 mines; 2 × depth charge racks, 25 depth charges

Rekordny was one of 29 Gnevny-class destroyers (officially known as Project 7) built for the Soviet Navy during the late 1930s. Completed in 1941, she was assigned to the Pacific Fleet. In 1954, Rekordny was sold to China and commissioned into the People's Liberation Army Navy (PLAN) the following year as the Anshan (Chinese: 鞍山舰; pinyin: Ānshān Jiàn). She was decommissioned in April 1992 and anchored at the Naval Museum at Qingdao.

== Design and description ==
Having decided to build the large and expensive 40-knot (74 km/h; 46 mph) Leningrad-class destroyer leaders, the Soviet Navy sought Italian assistance in designing smaller and cheaper destroyers. They licensed the plans for the Folgore class and, in modifying it for their purposes, overloaded a design that was already somewhat marginally stable.

The Gnevnys had an overall length of 112.8 meters (370 ft 1 in), a beam of 10.2 meters (33 ft 6 in), and a draft of 4.8 meters (15 ft 9 in) at deep load. The ships were significantly overweight, almost 200 metric tons (197 long tons) heavier than designed, displacing 1,612 metric tons (1,587 long tons) at standard load and 2,039 metric tons (2,007 long tons) at deep load. Their crew numbered 197 officers and sailors in peacetime and 236 in wartime. The ships had a pair of geared steam turbines, each driving one propeller, rated to produce 48,000 shaft horsepower (36,000 kW) using steam from three water-tube boilers which was intended to give them a maximum speed of 37 knots (69 km/h; 43 mph). The designers had been conservative in rating the turbines and many, but not all, of the ships handily exceeded their designed speed during their sea trials. Others fell considerably short of it, although specific figures for most individual ships have not survived. Variations in fuel oil capacity meant that the range of the Gnevnys varied between 1,670 to 3,145 nautical miles (3,093 to 5,825 km; 1,922 to 3,619 mi) at 19 knots (35 km/h; 22 mph).

As built, the Gnevny-class ships mounted four 130-millimeter (5.1 in) B-13 guns in two pairs of superfiring single mounts fore and aft of the superstructure. Anti-aircraft defense was provided by a pair of 76.2-millimeter (3 in) 34-K AA guns in single mounts and a pair of 45-millimeter (1.8 in) 21-K AA guns as well as two 12.7-millimeter (0.50 in) DK or DShK machine guns. They carried six 533 mm (21.0 in) torpedo tubes in two rotating triple mounts; each tube was provided with a reload. The ships could also carry a maximum of either 60 or 95 mines and 25 depth charges. They were fitted with a set of Mars hydrophones for anti-submarine work, although they were useless at speeds over 3 knots (5.6 km/h; 3.5 mph). The ships were equipped with two K-1 paravanes intended to destroy mines and a pair of depth-charge throwers.

== Construction and service ==
Major components for the ship that became Rekordny were laid down at Shipyard No. 198 (Andre Marti South) in Nikolayev on 25 September 1936 as yard number 327 and were then railed to Vladivostok for completion at Shipyard No. 202 (Dalzavod) where the ship was laid down again in July 1937. She was launched on 6 April 1939 and commissioned on 9 January 1941.

== In Chinese service ==
In 1955 Rekordny, was bought by the People's Liberation Army Navy (PLAN) and renamed Anshan (Chinese: 鞍山舰; pinyin: Ānshān Jiàn). The ship was transferred to the People's Liberation Army Navy from the USSR in October 1954 along with three other former Gnevny-class destroyers of the Soviet Navy as part of a larger transfer deal which also saw the transfer of submarines, minesweepers and torpedo boats.

The ship was commissioned into the Chinese navy in 1955 and was named after the industrial city of Anshan in the modern province of Liaoning. She was assigned the pennant number 101. During the 38 years she served the PLAN, she was visited by nine foreign dignitaries as well as two Chinese leaders: Zhou Enlai and Deng Xiaoping

She was decommissioned in April 1992 and anchored at the Naval Museum at Qingdao.

== Bibliography ==
- Balakin, Sergey (2007). Легендарные "семёрки" Эсминцы "сталинской" серии [Legendary Sevens: Stalin's Destroyer Series] (in Russian). Moscow: Yauza/Eksmo. ISBN 978-5-699-23784-5.
- Berezhnoy, Sergey (2002). Крейсера и миноносцы. Справочник [Guide to Cruisers and Destroyers] (in Russian). Moscow: Voenizdat. ISBN 5-203-01780-8.
- Budzbon, Przemysaw (1980). "Soviet Union". In Chesneau, Roger (ed.). Conway's All the World's Fighting Ships 1922–1946. Greenwich, England: Conway Maritime Press. pp. 318–346. ISBN 0-85177-146-7.
- Bussert, James C. & Elleman, Bruce C. (2011). People's Liberation Army Navy: Combat Systems Technology, 1949-2010. Annapolis, Maryland: Naval Institute Press. ISBN 978-1-59114-080-1.
- Hill, Alexander (2018). Soviet Destroyers of World War II. New Vanguard. Vol. 256. Oxford, England: Osprey Publishing. ISBN 978-1-4728-2256-7.
- Lyon, Hugh; Friedman, Norman & Chumbley, Stephen (1995). "China (People's Republic)". In Chumbley, Stephen (ed.). Conway's All the World's Fighting Ships 1947-1995 (Revised ed.). Annapolis, Maryland: Naval Institute Press. pp. 57–68. ISBN 1-55750-132-7.
- Platonov, Andrey V. (2002). Энциклопедия советских надводных кораблей 1941–1945 [Encyclopedia of Soviet Surface Ships 1941–1945] (in Russian). Saint Petersburg: Poligon. ISBN 5-89173-178-9.
- Rohwer, Jürgen (2005). Chronology of the War at Sea 1939–1945: The Naval History of World War Two (3rd Revised ed.). Annapolis, Maryland: Naval Institute Press. ISBN 1-59114-119-2.
- Rohwer, Jürgen & Monakov, Mikhail S. (2001). Stalin's Ocean-Going Fleet. London, England: Frank Cass. ISBN 0-7146-4895-7.
- Yakubov, Vladimir & Worth, Richard (2008). "The Soviet Project 7/7U Destroyers". In Jordan, John & Dent, Stephen (eds.). Warship 2008. London, England: Conway. pp. 99–114. ISBN 978-1-84486-062-3.
