= Soviet destroyer Retivy =

Destroyer of the Soviet Navy

Coordinates: 38.8723861°N 121.6710852°E

- Retivy as a museum ship in China, now named Taiyuan

History

Soviet Union
- Name: Retivy
- Ordered: 2nd Five-Year Plan
- Builder: Shipyard No. 198 (Andre Marti (South)), Nikolayev; Shipyard No. 199, Komsomolsk-on-Amur
- Laid down: 23 August 1936; 29 July 1937
- Launched: 27 September 1939
- Completed: 10 October 1941
- Fate: Transferred to the People's Liberation Army Navy, 14 January 1955

People's Republic of China
- Name: Jilin or Chi Lin; later Taiyuan
- Acquired: 14 January 1955
- Reclassified: As a missile destroyer, 1974; As a training ship, 1991
- Stricken: September 1991
- Fate: Scrapped, 2026

General characteristics (Gnevny as completed, 1938)
- Class & type: Gnevny-class destroyer
- Displacement: 1,612 t (1,587 long tons) (standard)
- Length: 112.8 m (370 ft 1 in) (o/a)
- Beam: 10.2 m (33 ft 6 in)
- Draft: 4.8 m (15 ft 9 in)
- Installed power: 3 water-tube boilers; 48,000 shp (36,000 kW)
- Propulsion: 2 shafts; 2 geared steam turbines
- Speed: 38 knots (70 km/h; 44 mph)
- Range: 2,720 nmi (5,040 km; 3,130 mi) at 19 knots (35 km/h; 22 mph)
- Complement: 197 (236 wartime)
- Sensors & processing systems: Mars hydrophone
- Armament: 4 × single 130 mm (5.1 in) guns; 2 × single 76.2 mm (3 in) AA guns; 2 × single 45 mm (1.8 in) AA guns; 2 × single 12.7 mm (0.50 in) AA machineguns; 2 × triple 533 mm (21 in) torpedo tubes; 60–96 mines; 2 × depth charge racks, 25 depth charges

Retivy was one of 29 Gnevny-class destroyers (officially known as Project 7) built for the Soviet Navy during the late 1930s. Completed in 1941, she was assigned to the Pacific Fleet.

== Design and description ==
Having decided to build the large and expensive 40-knot (74 km/h; 46 mph) Leningrad-class destroyer leaders, the Soviet Navy sought Italian assistance in designing smaller and cheaper destroyers. They licensed the plans for the Folgore class and, in modifying it for their purposes, overloaded a design that was already somewhat marginally stable.

The Gnevnys had an overall length of 112.8 meters (370 ft 1 in), a beam of 10.2 meters (33 ft 6 in), and a draft of 4.8 meters (15 ft 9 in) at deep load. The ships were significantly overweight, almost 200 metric tons (197 long tons) heavier than designed, displacing 1,612 metric tons (1,587 long tons) at standard load and 2,039 metric tons (2,007 long tons) at deep load. Their crew numbered 197 officers and sailors in peacetime and 236 in wartime. The ships had a pair of geared steam turbines, each driving one propeller, rated to produce 48,000 shaft horsepower (36,000 kW) using steam from three water-tube boilers which was intended to give them a maximum speed of 37 knots (69 km/h; 43 mph). The designers had been conservative in rating the turbines and many, but not all, of the ships handily exceeded their designed speed during their sea trials. Others fell considerably short of it, although specific figures for most individual ships have not survived. Variations in fuel oil capacity meant that the range of the Gnevnys varied between 1,670 to 3,145 nautical miles (3,093 to 5,825 km; 1,922 to 3,619 mi) at 19 knots (35 km/h; 22 mph).

As built, the Gnevny-class ships mounted four 130-millimeter (5.1 in) B-13 guns in two pairs of superfiring single mounts fore and aft of the superstructure. Anti-aircraft defense was provided by a pair of 76.2-millimeter (3 in) 34-K AA guns in single mounts and a pair of 45-millimeter (1.8 in) 21-K AA guns as well as two 12.7-millimeter (0.50 in) DK or DShK machine guns. They carried six 533 mm (21.0 in) torpedo tubes in two rotating triple mounts; each tube was provided with a reload. The ships could also carry a maximum of either 60 or 95 mines and 25 depth charges. They were fitted with a set of Mars hydrophones for anti-submarine work, although they were useless at speeds over 3 knots (5.6 km/h; 3.5 mph). The ships were equipped with two K-1 paravanes intended to destroy mines and a pair of depth-charge throwers.

== Construction and service ==
Major components for the ship that became Retivy were laid down at Shipyard No. 198 (Andre Marti South) in Nikolayev on 23 August 1936 as yard number 323 and were then railed to Shipyard No. 199 at Komsomolsk-on-Amur, Siberia, for completion where the ship was laid down again on 29 July 1937. She was launched on 27 September 1939 and commissioned on 10 October 1941. After being transferred to the People's Liberation Army Navy in January 1955, she served for another 36 years under the Chinese flag. She was decommissioned in September 1991, and was subsequently used as a museum and training ship at Laohutan Bay, Dalian.

On 24 February 2026, due to seawater corrosion and natural aging severely impairing her structural integrity, Taiyuan was scrapped in situ at Dalian.

== Sources ==
- Balakin, Sergey (2007). Легендарные "семёрки" Эсминцы "сталинской" серии [Legendary Sevens: Stalin's destroyer series] (in Russian). Moscow: Yauza/Eksmo. ISBN 978-5-699-23784-5.
- Berezhnoy, Sergey (2002). Крейсера и миноносцы. Справочник [Guide to Cruisers and Destroyers] (in Russian). Moscow: Voenizdat. ISBN 5-203-01780-8.
- Budzbon, Przemysaw (1980). "Soviet Union". In Chesneau, Roger (ed.). Conway's All the World's Fighting Ships 1922–1946. Greenwich, UK: Conway Maritime Press. pp. 318–346. ISBN 0-85177-146-7.
- Bussert, James C. & Elleman, Bruce C. (2011). People's Liberation Army Navy: Combat Systems Technology, 1949-2010. Annapolis, Maryland: Naval Institute Press. ISBN 978-1-59114-080-1.
- Hill, Alexander (2018). Soviet Destroyers of World War II. New Vanguard. Vol. 256. Oxford, UK: Osprey Publishing. ISBN 978-1-4728-2256-7.
- Lyon, Hugh; Friedman, Norman & Chumbley, Stephen (1995). "China (People's Republic)". In Chumbley, Stephen (ed.). Conway's All the World's Fighting Ships 1947-1995 (Revised ed.). Annapolis, Maryland: Naval Institute Press. pp. 57–68. ISBN 1-55750-132-7.
- Platonov, Andrey V. (2002). Энциклопедия советских надводных кораблей 1941–1945 [Encyclopedia of Soviet Surface Ships 1941–1945] (in Russian). Saint Petersburg: Poligon. ISBN 5-89173-178-9.
- Rohwer, Jürgen (2005). Chronology of the War at Sea 1939–1945: The Naval History of World War Two (Third Revised ed.). Annapolis, Maryland: Naval Institute Press. ISBN 1-59114-119-2.
- Rohwer, Jürgen & Monakov, Mikhail S. (2001). Stalin's Ocean-Going Fleet. London: Frank Cass. ISBN 0-7146-4895-7.
- Yakubov, Vladimir & Worth, Richard (2008). "The Soviet Project 7/7U Destroyers". In Jordan, John & Dent, Stephen (eds.). Warship 2008. London: Conway. pp. 99–114. ISBN 978-1-84486-062-3.
