= Gnevny-class destroyer =

Class of warship of the Soviet Union

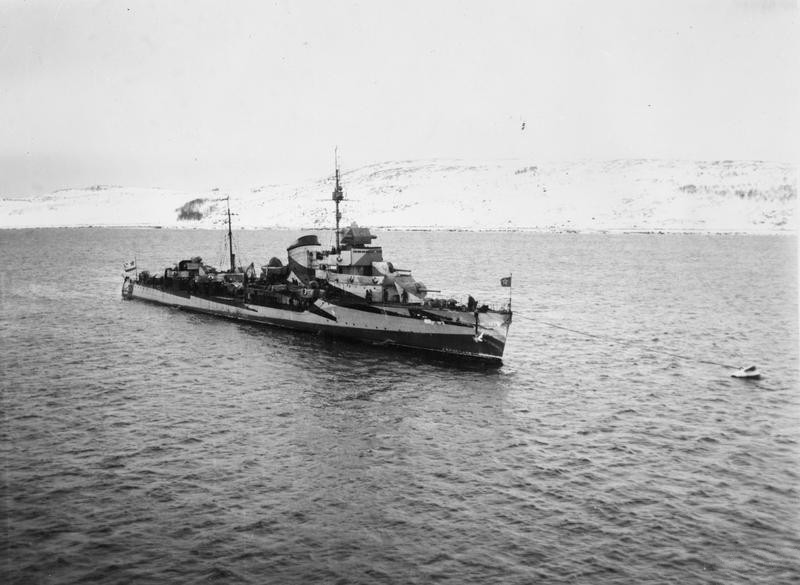
- Aerial view of Razumny, March 1944

Class overview
- Name: Gnevny-class
- Builders: Shipyard No.198 (Marti) (15); Shipyard No.190 (Zhdanov) (7); Shipyard No.189 (Ordzhonikidze) (4); Shipyard No.200 (61 Kommunar) (3); Fitting Out Only; Shipyard No.199 (8); Shipyard No.202 (5)
- Operators: Soviet Navy; People's Liberation Army Navy
- Preceded by: Gogland class (planned); Fidonisy class (actual)
- Succeeded by: Storozhevoy class
- Subclasses: Anshan class
- Built: 1935–1942
- In service: 1938–1990
- Planned: 36
- Completed: 29
- Canceled: 6
- Lost: 7
- Retired: 23
- Preserved: 2

General characteristics (Gnevny as completed, 1938)
- Type: Destroyer
- Displacement: 1,612 t (1,587 long tons) (standard)
- Length: 112.8 m (370 ft 1 in)
- Beam: 10.2 m (33 ft 6 in)
- Draft: 4.8 m (15 ft 9 in)
- Installed power: 48,000 shp (36,000 kW); 3 water-tube boilers
- Propulsion: 2 shafts; 2 geared steam turbines
- Speed: 38.3 knots (70.9 km/h; 44.1 mph)
- Range: 2,640 nmi (4,890 km; 3,040 mi) at 19.83 knots (36.73 km/h; 22.82 mph)
- Complement: 197 (236 wartime)
- Sensors & processing systems: Arktur hydrophone
- Armament: 4 × single 130 mm (5.1 in) guns; 2 × single 76.2 mm (3 in) AA guns; 2 × single 45 mm (1.8 in) AA guns; 2 × single 12.7 mm (0.50 in) AA machineguns; 2 × triple 533 mm (21.0 in) torpedo tubes; 60–95 mines; 25 depth charges

The Gnevny class (Russian: тип “Гневный”) were a group of 29 destroyers built for the Soviet Navy in the late 1930s. They are sometimes known as the Gremyashchiy class and the official Soviet designation was Project 7. These ships fought in World War II.

In the early 1930s the Soviets felt able to restart construction of fleet destroyers and forty-eight ships were ordered under the Second Five-Year Plan.

The design was produced with Italian assistance despite ideological differences between the Soviets and Fascist Italy. They resembled contemporary destroyers built in Italy for the Greek and Turkish navies.

They suffered from some of the same weaknesses of contemporary Italian ships with structural weakness and limited seaworthiness. There were also significant machinery problems in the earliest ships. The design flaws were apparent after trials of the first units in 1936–1937 and production stopped after 29 ships. A modified design was then placed into production as the Type 7U.

Four surviving ships from the Pacific Fleet were transferred to the People's Liberation Army Navy and served as the Anshan-class destroyers.

== Design and description ==
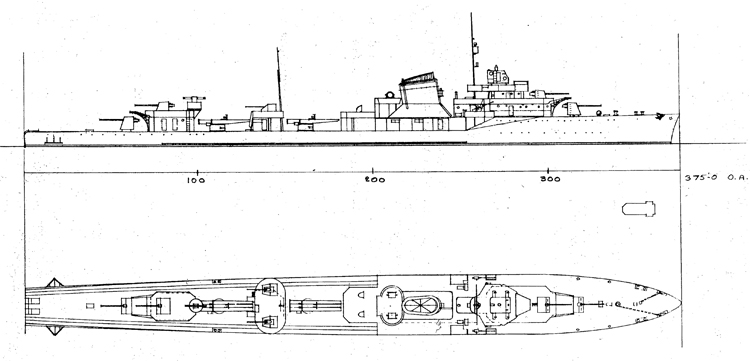
Right elevation and plan of the Gnevny class

Having decided on the specifications of the large 40-knot (74 km/h; 46 mph) Leningrad-class destroyer leaders, the Soviet Navy sought Italian assistance in designing smaller and cheaper destroyers. They licensed the plans for the Folgore class and, in modifying it for their purposes, overloaded a design that was already somewhat marginally stable.

The Gnevnys had an overall length of 112.8 meters (370 ft 1 in), a beam of 10.2 meters (33 ft 6 in), and a draft of 4.8 meters (15 ft 9 in) at deep load. The ships were significantly overweight, almost 200 metric tons (197 long tons) heavier than designed, displacing 1,612 metric tons (1,587 long tons) at standard load and 2,039 metric tons (2,007 long tons) at deep load. Their crew numbered 197 officers and sailors in peacetime and 236 in wartime.

The ships were powered by two geared steam turbine sets, each driving a single three-bladed 3.18-meter (10 ft 5 in) propeller using steam provided by three water-tube boilers that operated at a pressure of 26.5 kg/cm^{2} (2,599 kPa; 377 psi) and a temperature of 350 °C (662 °F). The turbines, rated at 48,000 shp (36,000 kW), were intended to give the ships a speed of 37 knots (69 km/h; 43 mph). The designers had been conservative in rating the turbines and many, but not all, of the ships handily exceeded their designed speed during their sea trials. Others fell considerably short of it; Boyky reached 34 knots (63 km/h; 39 mph) during her trials in 1943. Variations in fuel oil capacity meant that the range of the Gnevnys varied between 1,670 and 3,145 nautical miles (3,093 and 5,825 km; 1,922 and 3,619 mi) at 19 knots (35 km/h; 22 mph).

=== Armament and fire control ===
As built, the Gnevny-class ships mounted four 50-caliber 130-millimeter (5.1 in) B-13 guns in two pairs of superfiring single mounts fore and aft of the superstructure. Each gun was provided with 150 rounds. The development of the gun was troubled by excessive barrel erosion problems and three variants were built in a not entirely successful effort to resolve the problem which complicated logistical and operational support as each performed slightly differently. The manually operated mounts had an elevation range between −5° and +45° and had a rate of fire of 6–10 rounds per minute. They fired a 33.4-kilogram (74 lb) shell at a muzzle velocity of 870 m/s (2,900 ft/s), which gave them a range of 25,597 meters (27,993 yd).

Anti-aircraft defense was provided by two 55-caliber 76.2-millimeter (3 in) 34-K AA guns and two 46-caliber 45-millimeter (1.8 in) 21-K AA guns, all in single mounts as well as a pair of 12.7-millimeter (0.50 in) DK or DShK machine guns. The 34-K guns could elevate between −5° and +85°, had a rate of fire of fire of 15–20 rounds per minute, and the ships carried 300 rounds per gun for them. Their muzzle velocity of 801 meters per second (2,630 ft/s) gave their 26-pound (11.9 kg) high-explosive shells a maximum horizontal range of 14,640 meters (16,010 yd) and an effective ceiling of 6,500 meters (21,300 ft). The 21-K was a converted anti-tank gun with a rate of fire of 25–30 rounds per minute with an elevation range between −10° and +85°. The gun fired a 1.41-kilogram (3.1 lb) shell at a muzzle velocity of 760 m/s (2,500 ft/s). This gave them a range of 9,200 meters (10,100 yd). The Project 7s stowed 500 rounds for each gun. The DShK had an effective rate of fire of 125 rounds per minute and an effective range against aircraft of 2,500 meters (2,700 yd).

The ships were equipped with six 533 mm (21 in) torpedo tubes in two rotating triple mounts amidships; each tube was provided with a reload. The Project 7-class ships primarily used the 53-38 or the 53-38U torpedo, which differed only in the size of their warhead; the latter had a warhead 100 kilograms (220 lb) heavier than the 300-kilogram (660 lb) warhead of the 53-38. The torpedoes had three range/speed settings: 10,000 meters (11,000 yd) at 30.5 knots (56.5 km/h; 35.1 mph); 8,000 meters (8,700 yd) at 34.5 knots (63.9 km/h; 39.7 mph) and 4,000 meters (4,400 yd) at 44.5 knots (82.4 km/h; 51.2 mph). The ships could also carry a maximum of either 60 or 95 mines and 25 depth charges. They were fitted with a set of Mars hydrophones for anti-submarine work, although it was useless at speeds over 3 knots (5.6 km/h; 3.5 mph).

Fire control for the main battery of the Gnevnys was provided by a Mina-7 fire-control system that was derived from an Italian Galileo system. It included a TsAS-2 mechanical analog computer that received information from a KDP2-4 gunnery director on the roof of the bridge which mounted a pair of DM-4 four-meter (13 ft 1 in) stereoscopic rangefinders. Anti-aircraft fire control was strictly manual with only a DM-3 three-meter (9 ft 10 in) rangefinder to provide data to the guns.

== Ships ==
=== Black Sea Fleet ===
Ship	Builder	Launched	Completed	Fate
Bodry – Russian: Бодрый, lit. 'Brisk'	Marti Yard, Nikolaev	1936	1938	scrapped 1950s
Bystry – Russian: Быстрый, lit. 'Rapid'	Marti Yard, Nikolaev	1936	Nov 1938	sunk 1 July 1941 by magnetic mine
Bezuprechny – Russian: Безупречный, lit. 'Irreproachable'	61 Kommunar yard, Nikolaev	1936	1938	sunk 26 June 1942
Bditelny – Russian: Бдительный, lit. 'Watchful'	61 Kommunar yard, Nikolaev	1936	1938	sunk 2 July 1942 by KG 76
Boyky – Russian: Бойкий, lit. 'Spry / Bold'	Marti Yard, Nikolaev	29 Oct 1936	1 May 1939	scrapped 1958
Besposhchadny – Russian: Беспощадный, lit. 'Merciless'	Marti Yard, Nikolaev	1937	Sept 1939	sunk 6 October 1943, bombing by Stukas

=== Baltic Fleet ===
Ship	Builder	Laid down	Launched	Completed	Fate
Gnevny (Гневный (Angry))	Shipyard No. 190 (Zhdanov), Leningrad	8 December 1935	13 July 1936	23 December 1938	Sunk by aircraft, 26 June 1941
Gordy (Гордый (Proud))	Shipyard No. 190 (Zhdanov), Leningrad	25 June 1936	10 June 1937	23 December 1938	Sunk by mines, 14 November 1941
Gromky (Громкий (Loud))	Shipyard No. 190 (Zhdanov), Leningrad	29 April 1936	6 Dec 1937	31 December 1938	Transferred to the Soviet Northern Fleet in 1941, used as a target for nuclear testing 1957, near Novaya Zemlya
Grozny (Грозный (Formidable))	Shipyard No. 190 (Zhdanov), Leningrad	21 December	31 July 1936	9 December 1938	Transferred to the Soviet Northern Fleet in 1941, scrapped 1960
Gremyashchy (Гремящий (Thunderous))	Shipyard No. 190 (Zhdanov), Leningrad	23 July 1936	12 August 1937	28 August 1938	Transferred to the Soviet Northern Fleet in 1941, used as a target for nuclear testing 1957, near Novaya Zemlya
Grozyashchy (Грозящий (Threatening))	Shipyard No. 190 (Zhdanov), Leningrad	18 June 1936	5 January 1937	17 September 1939	During the first day of the Winter War, captured small Finnish steamer Auvo and took it as prize to Paldiski. Damaged by bombing near Leningrad, scrapped 1950s
Sokrushitelny (Сокрушительный (Destructive))	Shipyard No. 190 (Zhdanov), Leningrad	29 October 1936	23 August 1937	13 August 1939	Transferred to the Soviet Northern Fleet in 1941, sunk in a storm 22 November 1942 after her stern broke off, 35 dead
Smetlivy (Сметливый (Sly))	Shipyard No. 189 (Ordzhonikidze), Leningrad	17 September 1936	16 July 1937	6 November 1938	Sunk by mines, 4 November 1941
Steregushchy (Стерегущий (Watchful))	Shipyard No. 189 (Ordzhonikidze), Leningrad	12 August 1936	18 January 1938	30 October 1939	Bombed and sunk 21 September 1941 near Kronstadt, salvaged in 1944 and returned to service 1948, scrapped 1959
Stremitelny (Стремительный (Impetuous))	Shipyard No. 189 (Ordzhonikidze), Leningrad	22 August 1936	4 February 1937	18 November 1938	Transferred to the Soviet Northern Fleet in 1941, sunk 20 July 1941 by German Bombers in Ekatirinskaya Bay, Murmansk, partially raised in 1942 and cannibalised for spare parts to repair Raz'yaryonny

=== Pacific Fleet ===
All the Pacific Fleet ships were built by Dalzavod, Komsomolsk na Amure and towed to Vladivostok for fitting out due to the shallow depth of the Amur River. One unit, Reshitelny (i), was lost by stranding on passage 7 November 1938, being damaged beyond repair. The material for these ships was assembled in Nikolayev and then shipped east via the Trans-Siberian railway.

Ship	Launched	Completed	Fate
Reshitelnyy Решительный (decisive)	1937	Not completed	Lost while being towed between Sovetskaya Gavan and Vladivostok for final fitting out
Rezvy Резвый (Frisky)	1937	Dec 1939	Scrapped 1950s
Ryany Рьяный (Spirited)	Oct 1937	1940	Sunk as target 8 January 1961 in the Sea of Japan
Rastoropny Расторопный (Prompt)	1939	1941	Scrapped 1950s
Redky Редкий (Rare)		1941	Scrapped 1962
Razyashchy Разящий (Furious)	1938	1941	sunk as target ship 1961
Reshitelny Решительный (Decisive)	1939	1941	sold to China 1955 first as Changchun, Museum ship in Rushan from 1990
Retivy Ретивый (Ardent)	1940	1941	sold to China 1955 as Chi Lin(Jilin) and then renamed to Taiyuan, Stationary training ship for Dalian Naval Academy from September 1991. Scrapped 2026.
Revnostny Ревностный (Fervent)	1940	1941	scrapped 1950s
Razyaryonny Разъярённый (Enraged)	May 1941	Dec 1941	transferred to the Soviet Northern Fleet in 1942, target ship 1958
Razumny Разумный (Sensible)	1940	1941	transferred to the Soviet Northern Fleet in 1942, foundered 1960s
Rekordny Рекордный (Record breaking)	1940	1941	sold to China 1955 as Anshan, Museum ship in Qingdao from April 1992
Rezky Резкий (Brusque)	1940	1942	sold to China 1954 as Fushun, Scrapped 1989

== See also ==
- Freccia-class destroyer
- Kountouriotis-class destroyer
- Tinaztepe-class destroyer

== Sources ==
- Balakin, Sergey (2007). Легендарные "семёрки" Эсминцы "сталинской" серии [Legendary Sevens: Stalin's Destroyer Series] (in Russian). Moscow: Yauza/Eksmo. ISBN 978-5-699-23784-5.
- Berezhnoy, Sergey (2002). Крейсера и миноносцы. Справочник [Guide to Cruisers and Destroyers] (in Russian). Moscow: Voenizdat. ISBN 5-203-01780-8.
- Budzbon, Przemysaw (1980). "Soviet Union". In Chesneau, Roger (ed.). Conway's All the World's Fighting Ships 1922–1946. Greenwich, UK: Conway Maritime Press. pp. 318–346. ISBN 0-85177-146-7.
- Hill, Alexander (2018). Soviet Destroyers of World War II. New Vanguard. Vol. 256. Oxford, UK: Osprey Publishing. ISBN 978-1-4728-2256-7.
- Platonov, Andrey V. (2002). Энциклопедия советских надводных кораблей 1941–1945 [Encyclopedia of Soviet Surface Ships 1941–1945] (in Russian). Saint Petersburg: Poligon. ISBN 5-89173-178-9.
- Rohwer, Jürgen (2005). Chronology of the War at Sea 1939–1945: The Naval History of World War Two (Third Revised ed.). Annapolis, Maryland: Naval Institute Press. ISBN 1-59114-119-2.
- Rohwer, Jürgen & Monakov, Mikhail S. (2001). Stalin's Ocean-Going Fleet: Soviet Naval Strategy and Shipbuilding Programs 1935–1953. London: Frank Cass. ISBN 0-7146-4895-7.
- Yakubov, Vladimir & Worth, Richard (2008). "The Soviet Project 7/7U Destroyers". In Jordan, John & Dent, Stephen (eds.). Warship 2008. London: Conway. pp. 99–114. ISBN 978-1-84486-062-3.
