= Makkaur Lighthouse =

Coastal lighthouse in Båtsfjord, Norway

Makkaur Lighthouse Makkaur fyr
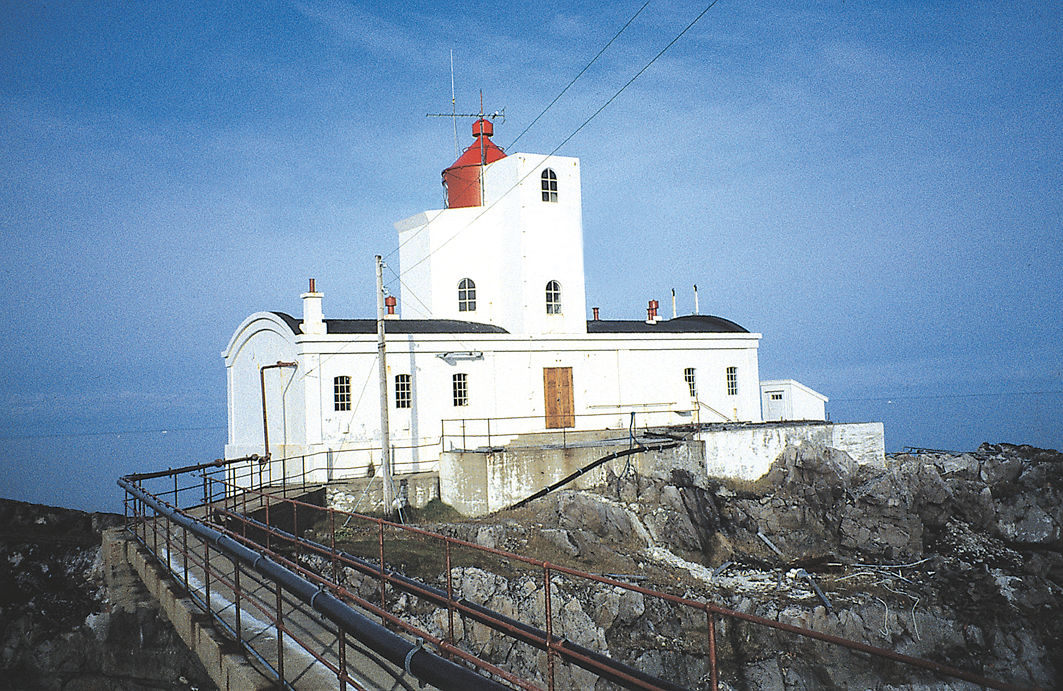
- View of the lighthouse
- Location of the lighthouse
- Location: Finnmark, Norway
- Coordinates: 70°42′23.8″N 30°04′43.4″E

Tower
- Constructed: 1901 (first); 1928 (second)
- Construction: concrete tower
- Automated: 2005
- Height: 12 metres (39 ft)
- Shape: square tower with balcony and lantern
- Markings: white tower, red lantern
- Heritage: cultural heritage preservation in Norway
- Racon: M

Light
- First lit: 1946 current
- Focal height: 39 metres (128 ft)
- Intensity: 1,232,000 candela
- Range: 17.6 nmi (32.6 km; 20.3 mi)
- Characteristic: Fl (2) W 20s.
- Norway no.: 966500

Makkaur Lighthouse (Norwegian: Makkaur fyr) is a coastal lighthouse located on the northern coast of the Varanger Peninsula in Båtsfjord Municipality, Finnmark county, Norway.

== History ==
The lighthouse was established in 1928, destroyed during World War II, and later rebuilt. The lighthouse was listed as a protected site in 1998.

The 12-metre (39 ft) tall white, square, concrete tower has a red top where the light is located. The 1,232,000 candela light emits two white flashes every 20 seconds at an elevation of 39 metres (128 ft) above sea level. The light can be seen for up to 17.6 nautical miles (32.6 km; 20.3 mi). The light is turned on from 12 August until 24 April each year, but it is off during the summer due to the midnight sun. There was an active foghorn operating at the site from 1922 until 1989. The site is only accessible by boat. The lighthouse was automated in 2005.

== Climate ==
Climate data for Makkaur Lighthouse 1991-2020 (9 m, extremes 1953-present)
Month	Jan	Feb	Mar	Apr	May	Jun	Jul	Aug	Sep	Oct	Nov	Dec	Year
Record high °C (°F)	7.5 (45.5)	8.2 (46.8)	9.6 (49.3)	13.6 (56.5)	23.5 (74.3)	29.0 (84.2)	32.0 (89.6)	29.4 (84.9)	23.2 (73.8)	14.5 (58.1)	11.2 (52.2)	8.4 (47.1)	32.0 (89.6)
Mean daily maximum °C (°F)	−1 (30)	−1.6 (29.1)	−0.4 (31.3)	2.1 (35.8)	5.9 (42.6)	9.3 (48.7)	13.1 (55.6)	12.9 (55.2)	9.8 (49.6)	5 (41)	1.8 (35.2)	0.3 (32.5)	4.8 (40.6)
Daily mean °C (°F)	−3.8 (25.2)	−4.3 (24.3)	−2.7 (27.1)	−0.1 (31.8)	3.6 (38.5)	7.0 (44.6)	10.2 (50.4)	10.3 (50.5)	7.8 (46.0)	3.2 (37.8)	−0.6 (30.9)	−2.4 (27.7)	2.4 (36.2)
Mean daily minimum °C (°F)	−6.6 (20.1)	−7 (19)	−5.2 (22.6)	−2.2 (28.0)	1.7 (35.1)	5.1 (41.2)	8.2 (46.8)	8.4 (47.1)	6 (43)	1.3 (34.3)	−2.7 (27.1)	−4.8 (23.4)	0.2 (32.3)
Record low °C (°F)	−22.6 (−8.7)	−21.7 (−7.1)	−18.5 (−1.3)	−13.5 (7.7)	−11.5 (11.3)	−2.5 (27.5)	2.0 (35.6)	1.6 (34.9)	−3.5 (25.7)	−10.5 (13.1)	−16.2 (2.8)	−20.4 (−4.7)	−22.6 (−8.7)
Average precipitation mm (inches)	44 (1.7)	35 (1.4)	47 (1.9)	41 (1.6)	37 (1.5)	49 (1.9)	67 (2.6)	70 (2.8)	60 (2.4)	75 (3.0)	43 (1.7)	33 (1.3)	601 (23.8)
Source 1: yr.no/Norwegian Meteorological Institute
Source 2: NOAA

== See also ==
- Lighthouses in Norway
- List of lighthouses in Norway
