= Soviet destroyer Razumny =

Destroyer of the Soviet Navy

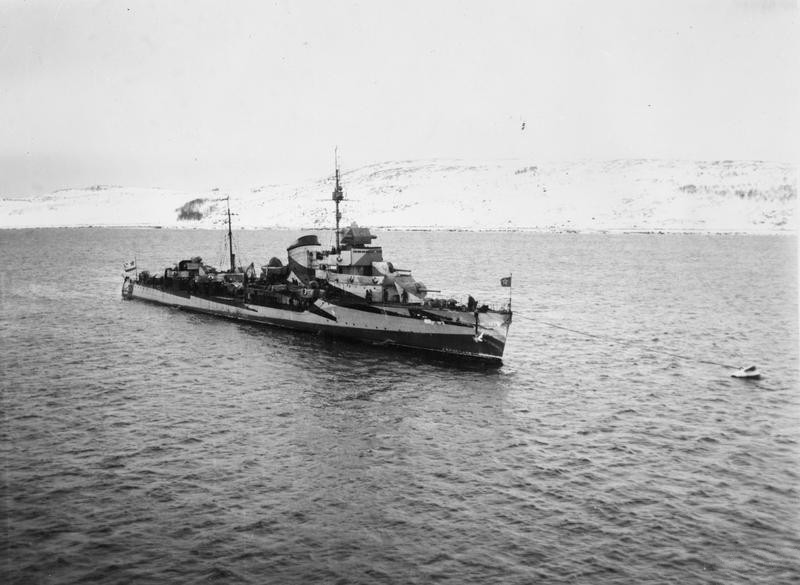
- Aerial view of Razumny, March 1944

History

Soviet Union
- Name: Razumny (Разумный (Sensible))
- Ordered: 2nd Five-Year Plan
- Builder: Shipyard No. 200 (named after 61 Communards), Nikolayev; Shipyard No. 202 (Dalzavod), Vladivostok
- Laid down: 7 July 1936; 16 August 1937
- Launched: 30 June 1939
- Completed: 20 October 1941
- Commissioned: 7 November 1941
- Renamed: TsL-29, 6 February 1960; PKZ-3, 15 September 1960; SM-14, 23 October 1962
- Reclassified: As a target ship, 6 February 1960; As an accommodation ship, 15 September 1960; As a target ship, 23 October 1962
- Stricken: 6 February 1960
- Fate: Sold for scrap, 4 May 1963

General characteristics (Gnevny as completed, 1938)
- Class & type: Gnevny-class destroyer
- Displacement: 1,612 t (1,587 long tons) (standard)
- Length: 112.8 m (370 ft 1 in) (o/a)
- Beam: 10.2 m (33 ft 6 in)
- Draft: 4.8 m (15 ft 9 in)
- Installed power: 3 water-tube boilers; 48,000 shp (36,000 kW)
- Propulsion: 2 shafts; 2 geared steam turbines
- Speed: 38 knots (70 km/h; 44 mph)
- Range: 2,720 nmi (5,040 km; 3,130 mi) at 19 knots (35 km/h; 22 mph)
- Complement: 197 (236 wartime)
- Sensors & processing systems: Mars hydrophone
- Armament: 4 × single 130 mm (5.1 in) guns; 2 × single 76.2 mm (3 in) AA guns; 2 × single 45 mm (1.8 in) AA guns; 2 × single 12.7 mm (0.50 in) AA machineguns; 2 × triple 533 mm (21 in) torpedo tubes; 60–96 mines; 2 × depth charge racks, 25 depth charges

Razumny (Russian: Разумный, lit. 'Sensible') was one of 29 Gnevny-class destroyers (officially known as Project 7) built for the Soviet Navy during the late 1930s. Originally named Prochny, she was renamed Razumny before completion in 1941, and was assigned to the Pacific Fleet. About a year after the German invasion of Russia in June 1941, she was ordered to join the Northern Fleet, sailing through the Arctic Ocean. Together with several other destroyers, Razumny left the Soviet Far East in July 1942 and arrived in Murmansk three months later where she began escorting convoys, both Allied ones from Britain and the United States and local ones in the White and Barents Seas. The ship was badly damaged by German bombs while she was refitting in 1943 and was under repairs for five months. Razumny spent most of the rest of the war on convoy escort duties, although she did bombard a German-occupied town during the Petsamo–Kirkenes Offensive of October 1944.

After the war Razumny was modernized between 1954 and 1957 and was briefly reclassified as a target ship in 1960 before she became an accommodation ship later that year. Again reclassified as a target ship in 1962, she was listed for disposal in 1963 and scrapped.

== Design and description ==
Having decided to build the large and expensive 40-knot (74 km/h; 46 mph) Leningrad-class destroyer leaders, the Soviet Navy sought Italian assistance in designing smaller and cheaper destroyers. They licensed the plans for the Folgore class and, in modifying it for their purposes, overloaded a design that was already somewhat marginally stable.

The Gnevnys had an overall length of 112.8 meters (370 ft 1 in), a beam of 10.2 meters (33 ft 6 in), and a draft of 4.8 meters (15 ft 9 in) at deep load. The ships were significantly overweight, almost 200 metric tons (197 long tons) heavier than designed, displacing 1,612 metric tons (1,587 long tons) at standard load and 2,039 metric tons (2,007 long tons) at deep load. Their crew numbered 197 officers and sailors in peacetime and 236 in wartime. The ships had a pair of geared steam turbines, each driving one propeller, rated to produce 48,000 shaft horsepower (36,000 kW) using steam from three water-tube boilers which was intended to give them a maximum speed of 37 knots (69 km/h; 43 mph). The designers had been conservative in rating the turbines and many, but not all, of the ships handily exceeded their designed speed during their sea trials. Others fell considerably short of it. Razumny reached 34.8 knots (64.4 km/h; 40.0 mph) during trials in 1957. Variations in fuel oil capacity meant that the range of the Gnevnys varied between 1,670 to 3,145 nautical miles (3,093 to 5,825 km; 1,922 to 3,619 mi) at 19 knots (35 km/h; 22 mph). Razumny herself demonstrated a range of 2,300 nmi (4,300 km; 2,600 mi) at that speed.

As built, the Gnevny-class ships mounted four 130-millimeter (5.1 in) B-13 guns in two pairs of superfiring single mounts fore and aft of the superstructure. Anti-aircraft defense was provided by a pair of 76.2-millimeter (3 in) 34-K AA guns in single mounts and a pair of 45-millimeter (1.8 in) 21-K AA guns as well as two 12.7-millimeter (0.50 in) DK or DShK machine guns. They carried six 533 mm (21.0 in) torpedo tubes in two rotating triple mounts; each tube was provided with a reload. The ships could also carry a maximum of either 60 or 95 mines and 25 depth charges. They were fitted with a set of Mars hydrophones for anti-submarine work, although they were useless at speeds over 3 knots (5.6 km/h; 3.5 mph). The ships were equipped with two K-1 paravanes intended to destroy mines and a pair of depth-charge throwers.

== Construction and service ==
Major components for the ship that became Razumny were laid down at Shipyard No. 200 (named after 61 Communards) in Nikolayev on 7 July 1936 as yard number 1075 and were then railed to Vladivostok for completion at Shipyard No. 202 (Dalzavod) where the ship was laid down again on 16 August 1937 as Prochny. She was launched on 30 June 1939 and was renamed Razumny on 25 August before she was completed on 20 October 1941 and commissioned on 7 November into the Pacific Fleet. As a result of the weakness of the Northern Fleet and the importance of the Arctic convoys of World War II, Stavka decided to transfer several modern ships from the Pacific to the Northern Fleet via the Northern Sea Route. Led by the destroyer leader Baku, Razumny and her sister ships Razyaryonny and Revnostny departed Vladivostok on 15 July 1942, although Revnostny collided with a freighter on the 18th and had to return to Vladivostok. They stopped at Tiksi on 14 August for a few days, resumed the voyage five days later and arrived off Kola Bay on 14 October.

Razumny and two other destroyers were sent to rescue the crew of her sister Sokrushitelny on 21 November after the ship had broken in half in a storm. Razumny only rescued one man because she was assigned to guard the other ships as they rescued the rest of the crew. On 25–27 December, the destroyer helped to escort Convoy JW 51A. In response to a radio intelligence report of a German convoy of two transports with a destroyer and two smaller escorts steaming east from Tromsø, Norway, Baku and Razumny made a night sortie on 20 January 1943. They engaged the German minelayer Skagerrak with the minesweepers M303 and M322, and subchasers UJ1104 and UJ1105 off Cape Makkaur. After closing the range, Baku fired four torpedoes at what the Soviets believed was the lead transport, all of which missed. As her lookouts reported explosions, the latter was believed sunk, and both Soviet warships turned their guns against what was believed to be the second transport, without result. The German vessels returned fire without damaging Baku, and the engagement ended after seven minutes when visibility deteriorated, allowing the Soviet ships to retreat behind a smokescreen laid by Razumny. She escorted a small convoy from the White Sea to Kola Bay on 3–4 February and began a refit on the 25th. While still in drydock on 3 April, the ship was struck by one bomb that penetrated through the entire ship before detonating next to the hull; another bomb exploded 1.5 meters (4 ft 11 in) from the side of the ship. One crewman was killed and three were wounded; repairs were completed on 25 June.

Razumny spent the next six months escorting local convoys, often between Murmansk and Arkhangelsk. She helped to escort Convoy JW 54A on 24–25 November and Convoy JW 55B on 28–30 December. The ship and three other destroyers made an unsuccessful attempt to intercept German supply ships off the Norwegian coast on 20–22 January 1944. Razumny was one of the escorts for Convoy JW 56A on 27–29 January and she spent most of the next year escorting Allied convoys, notably Convoys JW 57, JW 58, JW 59, JW 60, JW 61, RA 61, JW 62 and JW 63 as well as local ones. During the Petsamo–Kirkenes Offensive, Razumny bombarded the Norwegian town of Vardø on 26 October. Norwegian fishing boat Spurven was sunk at Vardo. Her last escort mission was on 20 January 1945.

After the war, the ship had a lengthy modernization from 1954 to 30 June 1957. She stricken from the Navy List and redesignated as target ship TsL-29 on 6 February 1960 and reclassified as accommodation ship PKZ-3 on 15 September. Although the ship was listed for disposal on 4 July 1960, she was converted into target ship SM-14 on 23 October 1962. The hulk was discarded on 4 May 1963 and subsequently scrapped over the next year.

== Sources ==
- Balakin, Sergey (2007). Легендарные "семёрки" Эсминцы "сталинской" серии [Legendary Sevens: Stalin's destroyer series] (in Russian). Moscow: Yauza/Eksmo. ISBN 978-5-699-23784-5.
- Berezhnoy, Sergey (2002). Крейсера и миноносцы. Справочник [Guide to Cruisers and Destroyers] (in Russian). Moscow: Voenizdat. ISBN 5-203-01780-8.
- Budzbon, Przemysaw (1980). "Soviet Union". In Chesneau, Roger (ed.). Conway's All the World's Fighting Ships 1922–1946. Greenwich, UK: Conway Maritime Press. pp. 318–346. ISBN 0-85177-146-7.
- Hill, Alexander (2018). Soviet Destroyers of World War II. New Vanguard. Vol. 256. Oxford, UK: Osprey Publishing. ISBN 978-1-4728-2256-7.
- Platonov, Andrey V. (2002). Энциклопедия советских надводных кораблей 1941–1945 [Encyclopedia of Soviet Surface Ships 1941–1945] (in Russian). Saint Petersburg: Poligon. ISBN 5-89173-178-9.
- Rohwer, Jürgen (2005). Chronology of the War at Sea 1939–1945: The Naval History of World War Two (Third Revised ed.). Annapolis, Maryland: Naval Institute Press. ISBN 1-59114-119-2.
- Rohwer, Jürgen & Monakov, Mikhail S. (2001). Stalin's Ocean-Going Fleet. London: Frank Cass. ISBN 0-7146-4895-7.
- Yakubov, Vladimir & Worth, Richard (2008). "The Soviet Project 7/7U Destroyers". In Jordan, John & Dent, Stephen (eds.). Warship 2008. London: Conway. pp. 99–114. ISBN 978-1-84486-062-3.
