= Amur Shipbuilding Plant =

Shipbuilding company based in Russia

Coordinates: 50°32′52.37″N 137°2′38.14″E

- Company type: Open joint-stock company
- Industry: Shipbuilding
- Headquarters: Komsomolsk-on-Amur, Russia
- Revenue: $198 million (2017)
- Operating income: −$5.59 million (2017)
- Net income: −$28 million (2017)
- Total assets: $1.21 billion (2017)
- Total equity: $17 million (2017)
- Parent: United Shipbuilding Corporation
- Website: асзкмс.рф

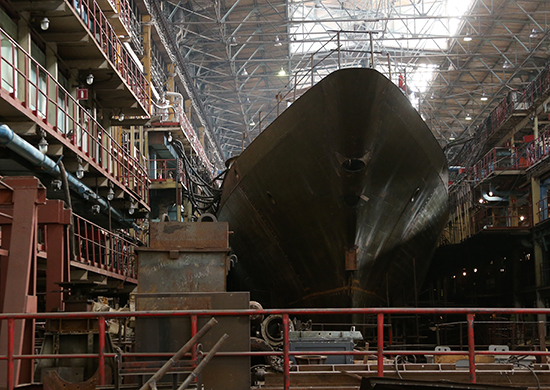
Amur Shipbuilding Plant in 2014

OJSC Amur Shipbuilding Plant (Russian: Амурский судостроительный завод, Amurskiy Sudostroitelnyy Zavod, and also called the "Leninskiy Komsomol Shipyard") is an important shipyard in eastern Russia, based in Komsomolsk-on-Amur, and founded in 1932. It employs 15,000 people, and produces both civilian and military ships, including nuclear submarines.

Around 97 submarines (56 nuclear-powered and 41 conventional) as well as 36 warships were built at the yard. The shipyard started building nuclear submarines in 1957, with the first one completed in 1960. Submarines built at the Amur Shipbuilding plant include Delta I class ballistic missile submarines, Echo I and II class cruise missile submarines and Akula-class attack submarines. In 1992, then-president Boris Yeltsin announced that the Sevmash shipyard in Severodvinsk would remain the only nuclear submarine construction site.

In 2008, the first nuclear submarine built at the shipyard in 13 years suffered an accident during sea trials, killing 20 people.

Previously privately owned, it was sold in May 2009 for a nominal price of a few thousand roubles to the state-controlled United Shipbuilding Corporation.
