= Dalzavod =

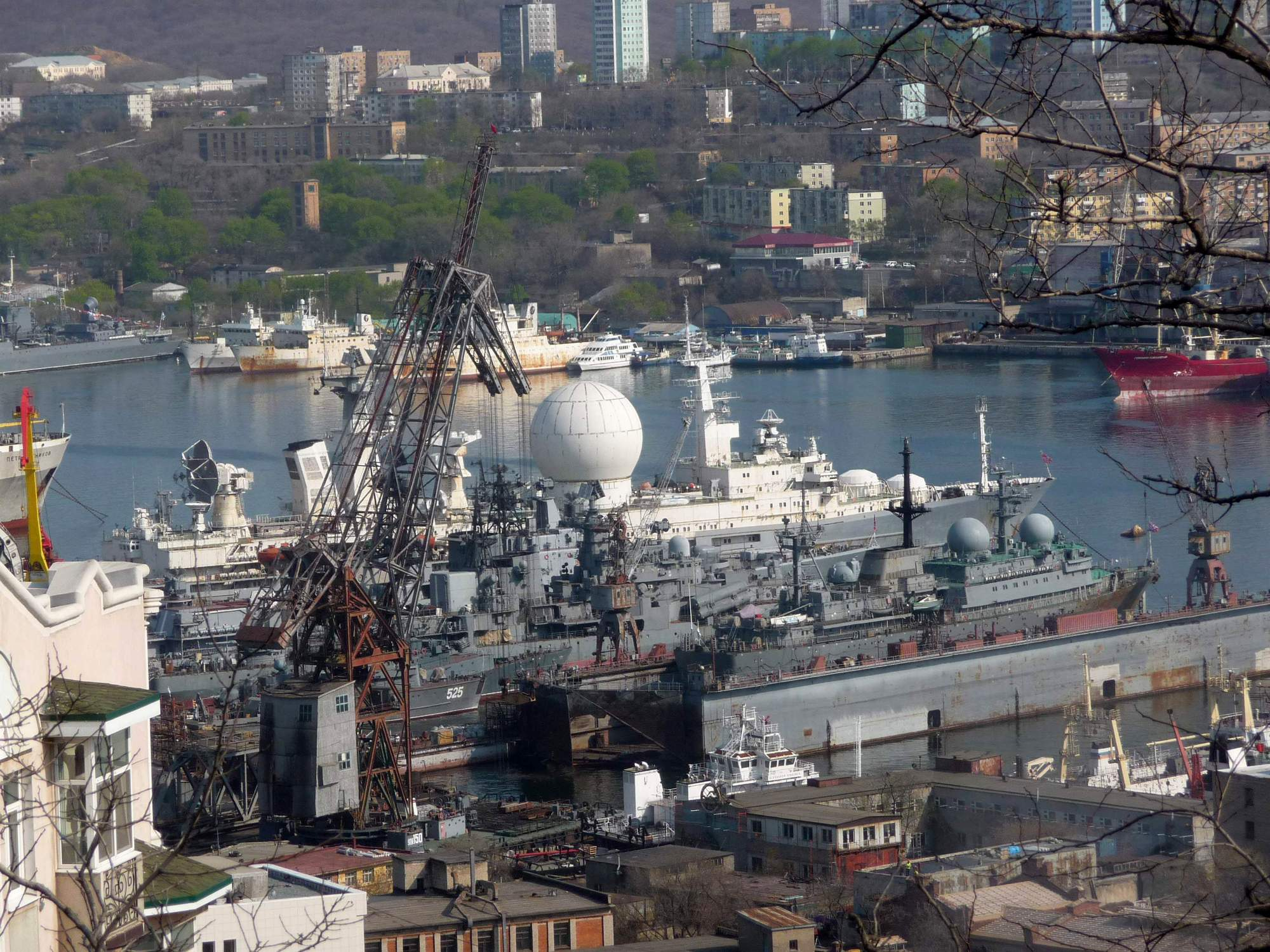
Dalzavod

Dalzavod (Russian: Центр судоремонта "Дальзавод") is a company based in Vladivostok, Russia.

Dalzavod was established in 1887 to repair the ships of Russia's Pacific Fleet. The largest defense facility in Vladivostok and one of the largest ship repair yards in Russia, Dalzavod has turned from repair of naval vessels to commercial vessel repair, small boat construction, vehicle repair, and other commercial ventures.

As of 2014, Dalzavod employed 2,400 workers.
