= 76.2 mm anti-aircraft gun Model 1935 (34-K) =

76.2 mm anti-aircraft gun Model 1935 (34-К)
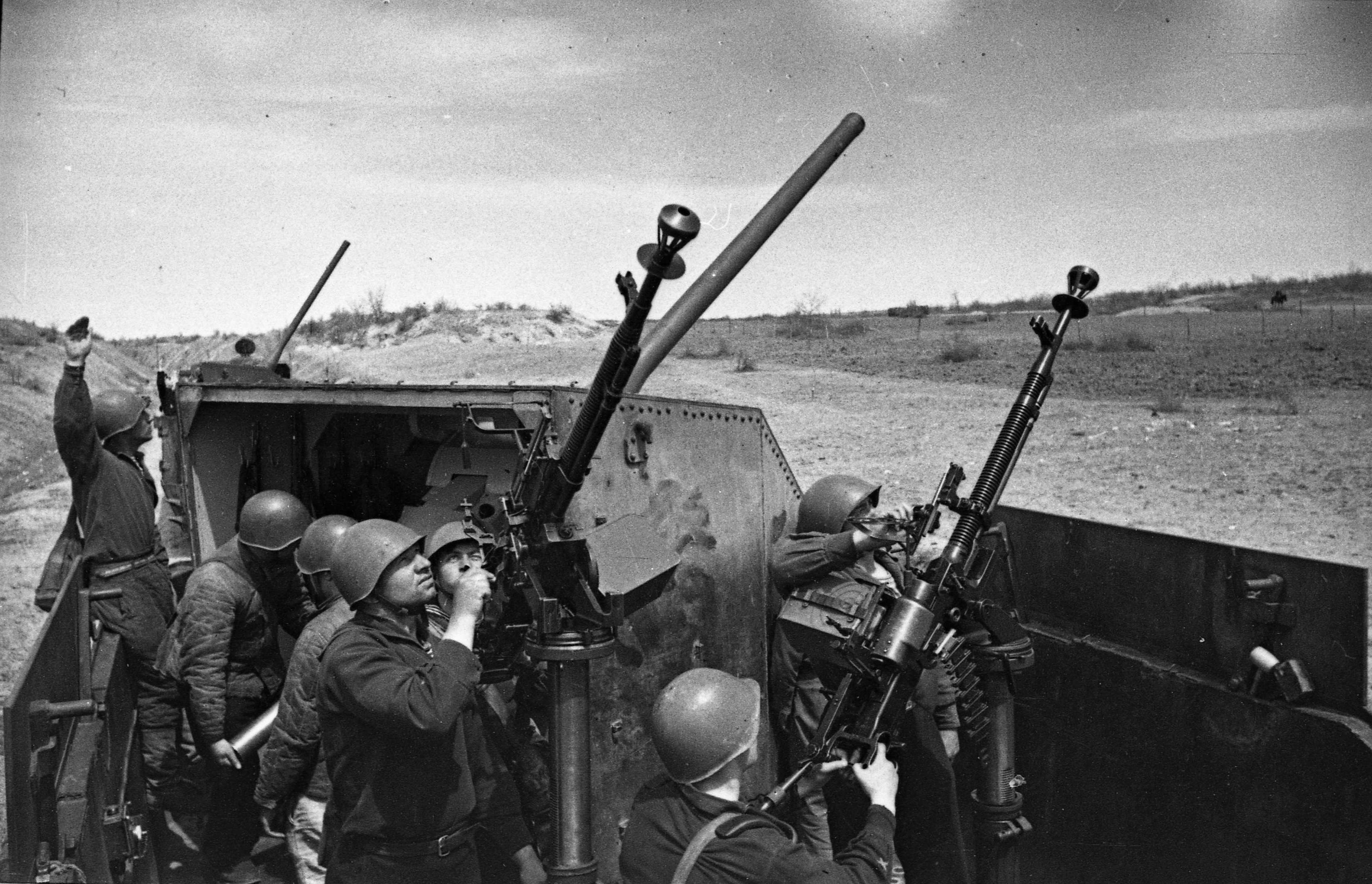
- Model 1935 (34-K) gun turrets on the armored train Zheleznyakov of the Sevastopol Coastal Defense Force.
- Type: Anti-aircraft gun
- Place of origin: Soviet Union

Production history
- Designed: 1934–1936
- Produced: 1939–1941
- No. built: 285

Specifications
- Mass: 1,243 kg (2,740 lb)
- Length: 4.223 m (13 ft 10 in)
- Barrel length: 3.971 m (13 ft) (55 caliber)
- Shell weight: 11.5–11.9 kg (25 lb 6 oz – 26 lb 4 oz)
- Caliber: 76.2 mm (3 in)
- Breech: Semi-automatic vertical sliding-block
- Recoil: Hydro-pneumatic
- Elevation: -5° to +85° (34-K and 81-K); -5.5° to +87.5° (39-K)
- Traverse: 360°
- Rate of fire: 15–18 rounds per minute (34-K); 12–20 rounds per minute (39-K)
- Muzzle velocity: 801–816 m/s (2,630–2,680 ft/s)
- Effective firing range: 6,500 m (21,300 ft) (effective vertical range)
- Maximum firing range: 8,970 m (9,810 yd) (horizontal range)
- Filling weight: 0.182–0.483 kg (6.4 oz – 1 lb 1.0 oz)

The 76.2 mm anti-aircraft gun Model 1935 (34-K) (Russian: 76.2-мм зенитная пушка обр. 1935 г. (34-К)) is a 76.2-millimeter (3 in) Soviet naval anti-aircraft gun. It was developed during the 1930s and used during World War II.

== Background ==
The 55-caliber gun was derived from a German weapon licensed in 1930. The initial attempt to put the gun on a naval mount was a failure. The Kalinin factory started work in 1934 on a new design that was accepted in late 1936. It entered production before the end of the year as the 34-K and 285 were built before the end of 1941. The manually operated mount weighed 4.95 metric tons (4.87 long tons). The same mount was combined with the Army 85 mm (3.3 in) gun as the 90-K system beginning in 1942.

Development of a twin-gun electrically powered mount also began in 1936, but it was not accepted until October 1939 as the 39-K. Only 15 mounts were produced before production ceased. Work on a simplified twin-gun mount began in 1939; only six 81-K mounts were built and they were installed on the battleships Marat and Oktyabrskaya Revolyutsiya in 1940. The 39-K weighed about 12.5 metric tons (12.3 long tons) and the 81-K approximately 12 metric tons (11.8 long tons).

== Soviet Navy ==
The Model 1935 was deployed aboard cruisers, destroyers, and Battleships of the Soviet Navy.

Ship classes:

- Admiral Nakhimov-class cruiser
- Gnevny-class destroyer
- Kiev-class destroyer
- Leningrad-class destroyer
- Soviet cruiser Kalinin
- Soviet cruiser Komintern
- Storozhevoy-class destroyer
- Tashkent-class destroyer

== Bibliography ==
- Campbell, John (1985). Naval Weapons of World War II. Annapolis, Maryland: Naval Institute Press. ISBN 0-87021-459-4.
