= Soviet destroyer Svobodny =

Svobodny (Russian: Свободный, lit. 'Free') is the name of the following ships of the Soviet Navy:

- Soviet destroyer Svobodny (1940), a Storozhevoy-class destroyer sunk by aircraft in 1942
- Soviet destroyer Svobodny (1949), a Skory-class destroyer
