= Soviet destroyer Stroyny =

Stroyny is the name of the following ships of the Soviet Navy:

- Soviet destroyer Stroyny (1940), a Storozhevoy-class destroyer scrapped in 1965
- Soviet destroyer Stroyny (1965), a Kashin-class destroyer scrapped in 1994
