= Soviet destroyer Strogy =

Strogy is the name of the following ships of the Soviet Navy:

- Soviet destroyer Strogy (1939), a Storozhevoy-class destroyer
- Soviet destroyer Strogy (1967), a Kashin-class destroyer
