= Soviet destroyer Serdity =

Serdity (Russian: Сердитый, lit. 'Enraged') is the name of the following ships of the Soviet Navy:

- Soviet destroyer Serdity (1940), a Storozhevoy-class destroyer sunk by aircraft in 1941
- Soviet destroyer Serdity (1949), a Skory-class destroyer
