= Soviet destroyer Silny =

Soviet Storozhevoy-class destroyer

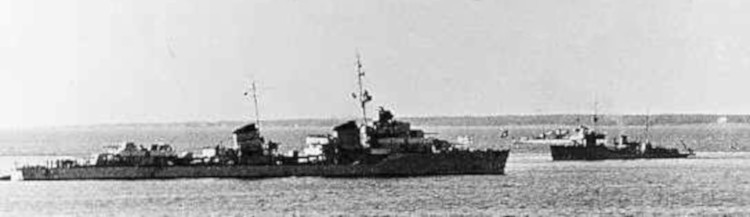
- An unidentified Storozhevoy-class destroyer in the Black Sea

History

Soviet Union
- Name: Silny (Сильный (Strong))
- Ordered: 2nd Five-Year Plan
- Builder: Shipyard No. 190 (Zhdanov), Leningrad
- Yard number: 520
- Laid down: 31 March 1938
- Launched: 8 April 1939
- Completed: 31 October 1940
- Commissioned: 12 April 1941
- Renamed: TsL-43, 20 February 1959
- Reclassified: As a target ship, 20 February 1959
- Fate: Scrapped, 21 January 1960

General characteristics (Storozhevoy, 1941)
- Class & type: Storozhevoy-class destroyer
- Displacement: 1,727 t (1,700 long tons) (standard); 2,279 t (2,243 long tons) (full load)
- Length: 112.5 m (369 ft 1 in) (o/a)
- Beam: 10.2 m (33 ft 6 in)
- Draft: 3.98 m (13 ft 1 in)
- Installed power: 4 water-tube boilers; 54,000 shp (40,000 kW) (trials)
- Propulsion: 2 shafts, 2 steam turbine sets
- Speed: 40.3 knots (74.6 km/h; 46.4 mph) (trials)
- Endurance: 2,700 nmi (5,000 km; 3,100 mi) at 19 knots (35 km/h; 22 mph)
- Complement: 207 (271 wartime)
- Sensors & processing systems: Mars hydrophones
- Armament: 4 × single 130 mm (5.1 in) guns; 2 × single 76.2 mm (3 in) AA guns; 3 × single 45 mm (1.8 in) AA guns; 4 × single 12.7 mm (0.50 in) DK or DShK machine guns; 2 × triple 533 mm (21 in) torpedo tubes; 58–96 mines; 30 depth charges

Silny (Russian: Сильный, lit. 'Strong') was one of 18 Storozhevoy-class destroyers (officially known as Project 7U) built for the Soviet Navy during the late 1930s. Although she began construction as a Project 7 Gnevny-class destroyer, Silny was completed in 1940 to the modified Project 7U design.

Serving with the Baltic Fleet, she participated in minelaying and escort operations after the start of the German invasion of the Soviet Union (Operation Barbarossa) in June 1941. Silny engaged German minesweepers in the Irbe Strait on 6 July without result, and was taken out of action by propeller damage later that month. Returning to service in late August, she conducted shore bombardments during the Siege of Leningrad. Bomb damage from an air raid in late September caused her to spend the rest of the year under repair. The destroyer saw little action for the rest of the war, aside from firing shore bombardments during the Krasnoye Selo–Ropsha and Vyborg–Petrozavodsk Offensives in 1944. Postwar, she continued to serve in the Baltic and was briefly converted to a target ship before being scrapped in the early 1960s.

== Design and description ==
Originally built as a Gnevny-class ship, Silny and her sister ships were completed to the modified Project 7U design after Joseph Stalin, General Secretary of the Communist Party of the Soviet Union, ordered that the latter be built with their boilers arranged en echelon, instead of linked as in the Gnevnys, so that a ship could still move with one or two boilers disabled.

Like the Gnevnys, the Project 7U destroyers had an overall length of 112.5 meters (369 ft 1 in) and a beam of 10.2 meters (33 ft 6 in), but they had a reduced draft of 3.98 meters (13 ft 1 in) at deep load. The ships were slightly overweight, displacing 1,727 metric tons (1,700 long tons) at standard load and 2,279 metric tons (2,243 long tons) at deep load. The crew complement of the Storozhevoy class numbered 207 in peacetime, but this increased to 271 in wartime, as more personnel were needed to operate additional equipment. Each ship had a pair of geared steam turbines, each driving one propeller, rated to produce 54,000 shaft horsepower (40,000 kW) using steam from four water-tube boilers, which the designers expected would exceed the 37-knot (69 km/h; 43 mph) speed of the Project 7s because there was additional steam available. Some fell short of it, although specific figures for most individual ships have not survived. Variations in fuel oil capacity meant that the range of the Project 7Us varied between 1,380 to 2,700 nautical miles (2,560 to 5,000 km; 1,590 to 3,110 mi) at 19 knots (35 km/h; 22 mph), that upper figure demonstrated by Storozhevoy.

The Project 7U-class ships mounted four 130-millimeter (5.1 in) B-13 guns in two pairs of superfiring single mounts fore and aft of the superstructure. Anti-aircraft defense was provided by a pair of 76.2-millimeter (3 in) 34-K AA guns in single mounts and three 45-millimeter (1.8 in) 21-K AA guns, as well as four 12.7-millimeter (0.50 in) DK or DShK machine guns. They carried six 533 mm (21.0 in) torpedo tubes in two rotating triple mounts amidships. The ships could also carry a maximum of 58 to 96 mines and 30 depth charges. They were fitted with a set of Mars hydrophones for anti-submarine work, although these were useless at speeds over 3 knots (5.6 km/h; 3.5 mph).

=== Modifications ===
During repairs in July and August 1941, Silny received a pair of 37-millimeter (1.5 in) 70-K AA guns. While under repair in May 1942, her 45 mm guns were replaced, one for one, by more 70-K guns. She was also equipped with two 20-millimeter (0.8 in) Oerlikon AA guns and a quadruple mount for Vickers 0.5 in (12.7 mm) AA machineguns. A 1.5 m (4 ft 11 in) DM rangefinder was also installed at that time. During a refit from 14 September to 16 October, Silny was fitted with a Lend-Lease British Type 128 ASDIC system. In November 1943 the ship received a British Type 286 search radar and the Oerlikons were replaced by a pair of 70-K guns in January 1944. The Type 286 radar was replaced by a Type 291 search radar in April 1945. by the end of the war, she had been fitted with a Type 284 fire-control radar. After the war, all of her AA guns were replaced by eight water-cooled V-11M versions of the 70-K gun in twin mounts.

== Construction and World War II ==
Silny was laid down in Shipyard No. 190 (Zhdanov) in Leningrad with the yard number 520 on 26 October 1936 as a Gnevny-class destroyer. She was relaid down as a Project 7U destroyer on 31 January 1938, and launched on 1 November 1938. Accepted by a state commission on 31 October 1940, Silny officially joined the Baltic Fleet Light Forces Detachment on 12 April 1941 when the naval jack of the Soviet Union was raised aboard her. Along with her sister ships Stoyky, Storozhevoy, and Serdity, she relocated from Tallinn to Ust-Dvinsk on 14 June. In the days following the beginning of Operation Barbarossa, the German invasion of the Soviet Union, on 22 June, the destroyer participated in minelaying operations in the Irbe Strait, escorting the cruiser Kirov between 27 and 28 June despite German aerial attacks.

On the morning of 6 July, Silny, Serdity, the old destroyer Engels, and the Uragan-class guard ships Tucha and Sneg departed for minelaying operations in the Irbe Strait; Silny carried 70 mines on her deck. Upon reaching the entrance to the strait at 12:29, German ships, reported as torpedo boats and an auxiliary cruiser, were spotted and both Type 7Us moved to attack, with Serdity leading. Although their gunners reported explosions on the German ships, which were actually the minesweeping support ship Minenräumschiff-11 (the former Osnabrück) and an attached minesweeper, Silny's captain ordered the dropping of the mines stored on her deck due to the danger of explosion. This latter was not completely fulfilled as at 13:19 she received a 105 mm (4.1 in) hit on her stern that killed four and wounded seven sailors, damaging one 130 mm gun. A splinter also set fire to a mine, which was thrown overboard by three nearby wounded sailors who received the Order of the Red Banner for their action a week later. The hit caused Silny to reverse course behind a smoke screen, and Serdity did likewise two minutes later. After Silny finished jettisoning her mines at 13:35, both destroyers were ordered to pursue the German ships an hour later, but instead returned to base as they had lost contact with the latter. In the battle, Silny expended thirty-three 130 mm shells without result.

In July, Silny made several more sorties to Moonsund and the Gulf of Riga, but had her screw damaged by grounding or contact with a shipwreck near shoals in Moonsund. She was sent to Kronstadt for repairs, leaving the dock on 23 August. Two days later, she bombarded Finnish positions on the coast of Vyborg Bay alongside Stoyky, expending more than 500 shells from her main guns over the next three days. The destroyer laid minefields in the Gulf of Finland during early September, setting 196 mines and 130 mine protectors in five sorties, before moving to Oranienbaum on 15 September to conduct shore bombardments of advancing German troops with the assistance of a fire correction post. There, Silny fired five hundred 130 mm shells until 20 September, when increased shelling and air raids on the exposed harbor of Oranienbaum forced her to withdraw to Kronstadt. (Note: Platonov gives a total of 653 shells fired throughout all of 1941; he agrees with Balakin except for the shells fired during September.)

The port was hit by a series of large German air raids beginning on 21 September. On the next day, the destroyer was attacked by nine Junkers Ju 87 dive bombers. Although one of the latter was hit by anti-aircraft fire, a 100 kg (220 lb) bomb hit the aft superstructure and several more exploded close to the ship, showering her with fragments. The aft portion of the hull was severely damaged by the bomb, which started a fire; seven crewmen were killed and twenty-seven wounded. To prevent an explosion, the aft ammunition magazines were flooded, after which the fire was extinguished. Late in the day, the destroyer put into the Kronstadt Marine Plant for repairs. In October, she went to Leningrad on one engine for complete repairs at the Baltic Shipyard. While at the shipyard, a hit from a medium-sized artillery shell killed seven and wounded another seven crew members, in addition to damaging one of her 130 mm guns. The repairs were completed on 30 December, but the destroyer spent the remainder of the war in Leningrad and Kronstadt.

Damaged by shelling on 20, 24 April and 14 May 1942, she was quickly repaired, downing a German aircraft with fire from a 37 mm gun on 24 April. After relocating to Kronstadt on the night of 25 July, Silny was refitted in September–October. From late 1942 to 1943, her only combat firing occurred on 1 June 1943 with the expenditure of eighteen 130 mm shells on Axis positions. She conducted shore bombardments in support of the Krasnoye Selo–Ropsha Offensive in January 1944, firing either 146 or about 400 main-gun shells. (Note: Platonov says 146 shells.) Assisted by forward observers, the destroyer fired her last forty-four 130 mm shells of the war from Kronstadt in a 10 June bombardment of Finnish positions on the Karelian Isthmus during the Vyborg–Petrozavodsk Offensive. From November to the end of the war, Silny was refitted at the Baltic Shipyard.

== Postwar ==
After the end of the war, Silny continued to serve with the Baltic Fleet, becoming part of the 4th Fleet between 25 February 1946 and 4 January 1956 when the latter was split. She underwent a major refit and modernization at Shipyard No. 890 in Tallinn, Estonia, between 19 November 1948 and 10 December 1954. The destroyer was removed from the combat fleet and reclassified as target ship TsL-43 on 20 February 1959. After being removed from the Soviet Navy on 21 January 1960, the former destroyer was transferred for scrapping at Paljassaare in Tallinn on 27 March when her crew was disbanded.

== Sources ==
- Balakin, Sergey (2007). Легендарные "семёрки" Эсминцы "сталинской" серии [Legendary Sevens: Stalin's Destroyer Series] (in Russian). Moscow: Yauza/Eksmo. ISBN 978-5-699-23784-5.
- Berezhnoy, Sergey (2002). Крейсера и миноносцы. Справочник [Guide to Cruisers and Destroyers] (in Russian). Moscow: Voenizdat. ISBN 5-203-01780-8.
- Hill, Alexander (2018). Soviet Destroyers of World War II. New Vanguard. Vol. 256. Oxford, UK: Osprey Publishing. ISBN 978-1-4728-2256-7.
- Platonov, Andrey V. (2002). Энциклопедия советских надводных кораблей 1941–1945 [Encyclopedia of Soviet Surface Ships 1941–1945] (in Russian). Saint Petersburg: Poligon. ISBN 5-89173-178-9.
- Rohwer, Jürgen & Monakov, Mikhail S. (2001). Stalin's Ocean-Going Fleet. London: Frank Cass. ISBN 0-7146-4895-7.
- Yakubov, Vladimir & Worth, Richard (2008). "The Soviet Project 7/7U Destroyers". In Jordan, John & Dent, Stephen (eds.). Warship 2008. London: Conway. pp. 99–114. ISBN 978-1-84486-062-3.
