= Soviet destroyer Skory (1939) =

Russian Storozhevoy-class destroyer

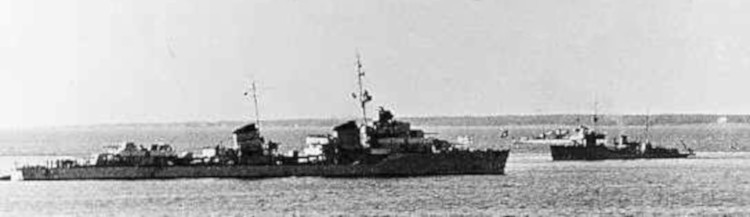
- An unidentified Storozhevoy-class destroyer in the Black Sea

History

Soviet Union
- Name: Skory (Скорый (Fast))
- Ordered: 2nd Five-Year Plan
- Builder: Shipyard No. 190 (Zhdanov), Leningrad
- Yard number: 524
- Laid down: 23 October 1938
- Launched: 24 July 1939
- Completed: 18 July 1941
- Fate: Sunk by mine, 28 August 1941

General characteristics (Storozhevoy, 1941)
- Class & type: Storozhevoy-class destroyer
- Displacement: 1,727 t (1,700 long tons) (standard); 2,279 t (2,243 long tons) (full load)
- Length: 112.5 m (369 ft 1 in) (o/a)
- Beam: 10.2 m (33 ft 6 in)
- Draft: 3.98 m (13 ft 1 in)
- Installed power: 4 water-tube boilers; 54,000 shp (40,000 kW) (trials)
- Propulsion: 2 shafts, 2 steam turbine sets
- Speed: 40.3 knots (74.6 km/h; 46.4 mph) (trials)
- Endurance: 2,700 nmi (5,000 km; 3,100 mi) at 19 knots (35 km/h; 22 mph)
- Complement: 207 (271 wartime)
- Sensors & processing systems: Mars hydrophones
- Armament: 4 × single 130 mm (5.1 in) guns; 2 × single 76.2 mm (3 in) AA guns; 3 × single 45 mm (1.8 in) AA guns; 4 × single 12.7 mm (0.50 in) DK or DShK machine guns; 2 × triple 533 mm (21 in) torpedo tubes; 58–96 mines; 30 depth charges

Skory (Russian: Скорый, lit. 'Fast') was one of 18 Storozhevoy-class destroyers (officially known as Project 7U) built for the Soviet Navy during the late 1930s. Although she began construction as a Project 7 Gnevny-class destroyer, Skory was completed in 1941 to the modified Project 7U design.

With her sea trials cut short by the beginning of Operation Barbarossa in June, Skory was assigned to the Baltic Fleet and fought in the defense of Tallinn, Estonia, providing naval gunfire support to Soviet troops. During the evacuation of Tallinn on 28 August, she struck a mine while attempting to tow the damaged destroyer leader Minsk and was nearly broken in half, sinking within minutes with the loss of 57 crewmen and an unknown number of passengers.

== Design and description ==
Originally built as a Gnevny-class ship, Skory and her sister ships were completed to the modified Project 7U design after Joseph Stalin, General Secretary of the Communist Party of the Soviet Union, ordered that the latter be built with their boilers arranged en echelon, instead of linked as in the Gnevnys, so that a ship could still move with one or two boilers disabled.

Like the Gnevnys, the Project 7U destroyers had an overall length of 112.5 meters (369 ft 1 in) and a beam of 10.2 meters (33 ft 6 in), but they had a reduced draft of 3.98 meters (13 ft 1 in) at deep load. The ships were slightly overweight, displacing 1,727 metric tons (1,700 long tons) at standard load and 2,279 metric tons (2,243 long tons) at deep load. The crew complement of the Storozhevoy class numbered 207 in peacetime, but this increased to 271 in wartime, as more personnel were needed to operate additional equipment. Each ship had a pair of geared steam turbines, each driving one propeller, rated to produce 54,000 shaft horsepower (40,000 kW) using steam from four water-tube boilers, which the designers expected would exceed the 37-knot (69 km/h; 43 mph) speed of the Project 7s because there was additional steam available. Some fell short of it, although specific figures for most individual ships have not survived. Variations in fuel oil capacity meant that the range of the Project 7Us varied from 1,380 to 2,700 nautical miles (2,560 to 5,000 km; 1,590 to 3,110 mi) at 19 knots (35 km/h; 22 mph), that upper figure demonstrated by Storozhevoy.

The Project 7U-class ships mounted four 130-millimeter (5.1 in) B-13 guns in two pairs of superfiring single mounts fore and aft of the superstructure. Anti-aircraft defense was provided by a pair of 76.2-millimeter (3 in) 34-K AA guns in single mounts and three 45-millimeter (1.8 in) 21-K AA guns, as well as four 12.7-millimeter (0.50 in) DK or DShK machine guns. They carried six 533 mm (21.0 in) torpedo tubes in two rotating triple mounts amidships. The ships could also carry a maximum of 58 to 96 mines and 30 depth charges. They were fitted with a set of Mars hydrophones for anti-submarine work, although these were useless at speeds over 3 knots (5.6 km/h; 3.5 mph).

== Construction and career ==
Skory was laid down in Shipyard No. 190 (Zhdanov) in Leningrad with the yard number 524 on 29 November 1936 as a Gnevny-class destroyer. She was relaid down as a Project 7U destroyer on 23 October 1938, and launched on 24 July 1939. When Operation Barbarossa, the German invasion of the Soviet Union, began on 22 June 1941, the ship was still fitting-out. Her trials were drastically curtailed as a result of the war and the Soviet naval jack was raised aboard her on 15 July, before joining the 2nd Division of the Baltic Fleet Light Forces Detachment three days later. Skory accompanied the hospital ships Iosif Stalin and Andrey Zhdanov to Tallinn on 25 July, and was officially transferred to the fleet on 1 August.

During her brief career the destroyer fought in the defense of Tallinn, expending 172 shells from her main guns between 24 and 28 August. While in the Tallinn roadstead on 26 August, a German shell struck her upper deck, killing three sailors and damaging the aft depth-charge launcher. During this day and the next, Skory received at least one direct hit and several near misses, also without significant damage. During the Evacuation of Tallinn, she accidentally rammed the subchaser MO-407, but remained afloat. On 28 August Skory was ordered to take the destroyer leader Minsk in tow, after she was damaged in the area of Cape Juminda by the explosion of a mine caught in her paravanes. While backing toward Minsk at 21:30, Skory struck a mine that nearly tore her hull in half. Within minutes the ship capsized and sank with the loss of 57 crew members, including the captain, in addition to an unknown number of Baltic Fleet Naval Aviation mechanics. Skory was struck from the Soviet Navy on 10 September.

== Sources ==
- Balakin, Sergey (2007). Легендарные "семёрки" Эсминцы "сталинской" серии [Legendary Sevens: Stalin's Destroyer Series] (in Russian). Moscow: Yauza/Eksmo. ISBN 978-5-699-23784-5.
- Berezhnoy, Sergey (2002). Крейсера и миноносцы. Справочник [Guide to Cruisers and Destroyers] (in Russian). Moscow: Voenizdat. ISBN 5-203-01780-8.
- Hill, Alexander (2018). Soviet Destroyers of World War II. New Vanguard. Vol. 256. Oxford, UK: Osprey Publishing. ISBN 978-1-4728-2256-7.
- Rohwer, Jürgen & Monakov, Mikhail S. (2001). Stalin's Ocean-Going Fleet. London: Frank Cass. ISBN 0-7146-4895-7.
- Yakubov, Vladimir & Worth, Richard (2008). "The Soviet Project 7/7U Destroyers". In Jordan, John & Dent, Stephen (eds.). Warship 2008. London: Conway. pp. 99–114. ISBN 978-1-84486-062-3.
