= Soviet destroyer Stoyky (1938) =

Russian Storozhevoy-class destroyer

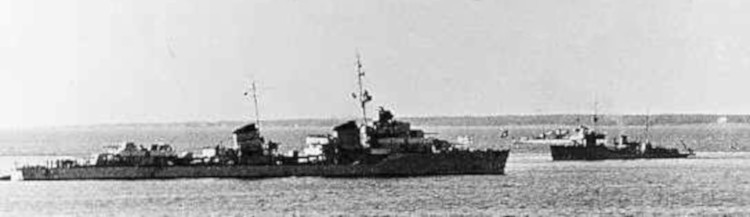
- An unidentified Storozhevoy-class destroyer in the Black Sea

History

Soviet Union
- Name: Stoyky (Стойкий (Steadfast))
- Ordered: 2nd Five-Year Plan
- Builder: Shipyard No. 190 (Zhdanov), Leningrad
- Yard number: 518
- Laid down: 31 March 1938
- Launched: 26 December 1938
- Commissioned: 18 October 1940
- Renamed: Vitze-Admiral Drozd (Вице-адмирал Дрозд), 13 February 1943; TsL-54, 6 February 1960
- Namesake: Valentin Drozd
- Reclassified: As a target ship, 6 February 1960
- Stricken: 28 September 1961
- Honors and awards: Guards designation, 3 April 1942
- Fate: Sank during a storm, 2 July 1961

General characteristics (Storozhevoy, 1941)
- Class & type: Storozhevoy-class destroyer
- Displacement: 1,727 t (1,700 long tons) (standard); 2,279 t (2,243 long tons) (full load)
- Length: 112.5 m (369 ft 1 in) (o/a)
- Beam: 10.2 m (33 ft 6 in)
- Draft: 3.98 m (13 ft 1 in)
- Installed power: 4 water-tube boilers; 54,000 shp (40,000 kW) (trials)
- Propulsion: 2 shafts, 2 steam turbine sets
- Speed: 40.3 knots (74.6 km/h; 46.4 mph) (trials)
- Endurance: 2,700 nmi (5,000 km; 3,100 mi) at 19 knots (35 km/h; 22 mph)
- Complement: 207 (271 wartime)
- Sensors & processing systems: Mars hydrophones
- Armament: 4 × single 130 mm (5.1 in) guns; 2 × single 76.2 mm (3 in) AA guns; 3 × single 45 mm (1.8 in) AA guns; 4 × single 12.7 mm (0.50 in) DK or DShK machine guns; 2 × triple 533 mm (21 in) torpedo tubes; 58–96 mines; 30 depth charges

Stoyky (Russian: Стойкий, lit. 'Steadfast') was one of 18 Storozhevoy-class destroyer (officially known as Project 7U) built for the Soviet Navy during the late 1930s. Although she began construction as a Project 7 Gnevny-class destroyer, Stoyky was completed in 1940 to the modified Project 7U design.

Serving with the Baltic Fleet, she participated in minelaying and escort operations in the Gulf of Riga campaign after the start of the German invasion of the Soviet Union (Operation Barbarossa) in June 1941. Taken out of action by propeller damage in the first half of July, the destroyer returned to service in late August, conducting shore bombardments and minelaying during the Siege of Leningrad. In November and December she participated in the evacuation of Hanko, after which she remained in Leningrad. Stoyky saw little action for the rest of the war, receiving the title of Guards in 1942 and being renamed Vitse-Admiral Drozd (Вице-адмирал Дрозд) in 1943. Postwar, she continued to serve in the Baltic and was briefly converted to a target ship before being sunk during a 1961 storm.

== Design and description ==
Originally built as a Gnevny-class ship, Stoyky and her sister ships were completed to the modified Project 7U design after Joseph Stalin, General Secretary of the Communist Party of the Soviet Union, ordered that the latter be built with their boilers arranged en echelon, instead of linked as in the Gnevnys, so that a ship could still move with one or two boilers disabled.

Like the Gnevnys, the Project 7U destroyers had an overall length of 112.5 meters (369 ft 1 in) and a beam of 10.2 meters (33 ft 6 in), but they had a reduced draft of 3.98 meters (13 ft 1 in) at deep load. The ships were slightly overweight, displacing 1,727 metric tons (1,700 long tons) at standard load and 2,279 metric tons (2,243 long tons) at deep load. The crew complement of the Storozhevoy class numbered 207 in peacetime, but this increased to 271 in wartime, as more personnel were needed to operate additional equipment. Each ship had a pair of geared steam turbines, each driving one propeller, rated to produce 54,000 shaft horsepower (40,000 kW) using steam from four water-tube boilers, which the designers expected would exceed the 37-knot (69 km/h; 43 mph) speed of the Project 7s because there was additional steam available. Some fell short of it, although specific figures for most individual ships have not survived. Variations in fuel oil capacity meant that the range of the Project 7Us varied from 1,380 to 2,700 nautical miles (2,560 to 5,000 km; 1,590 to 3,110 mi) at 19 knots (35 km/h; 22 mph), that upper figure demonstrated by Storozhevoy.

The Project 7U-class ships mounted four 130-millimeter (5.1 in) B-13 guns in two pairs of superfiring single mounts fore and aft of the superstructure. Anti-aircraft defense was provided by a pair of 76.2-millimeter (3 in) 34-K AA guns in single mounts and three 45-millimeter (1.8 in) 21-K AA guns, as well as four 12.7-millimeter (0.50 in) DK or DShK machine guns. They carried six 533 mm (21 in) torpedo tubes in two rotating triple mounts amidships. The ships could also carry a maximum of 58 to 96 mines and 30 depth charges. They were fitted with a set of Mars hydrophones for anti-submarine work, although these were useless at speeds over 3 knots (5.6 km/h; 3.5 mph).

=== Modifications ===
During her August 1941 repairs, Stoyky received a Soviet-produced Ultrafon sonar, two 37-millimeter (1.5 in) 70-K AA guns, and two BMB-1 depth-charge throwers. A temporary degaussing coil installed while in Tallinn in early July was replaced by the LFTI degaussing system in early September. In 1944–1945, the ship exchanged both of her 21-K mounts for six 70-Ks in single mounts and an additional 34-K mount. By the end of the war, she had received a Lend-Lease British Type 291 search radar and a British Type 128 ASDIC system. After the war, all of her AA guns were replaced by eight water-cooled V-11M versions of the 70-K gun in twin mounts.

== Construction and career ==
Stoyky was laid down in Shipyard No. 190 (Zhdanov) in Leningrad with the yard number 518 on 26 August 1936 as a Gnevny-class destroyer. She was relaid down as a Project 7U destroyer on 31 March 1938 and launched on 26 December 1938. Accepted by a state commission on 18 October 1940, the destroyer spent six months in Tallinn, during which defects found during trials were remedied and the organization of the crew settled. Stoyky officially joined the Baltic Fleet Light Forces Detachment on 12 April 1941, and was based in Ust-Dvinsk when Operation Barbarossa, the German invasion of the Soviet Union, began on 22 June. In the first week of the war, she laid minefields in the Irbe Strait, expending four 130 mm, ninety-seven 76 mm, and seventy-three 45 mm shells while firing on German aircraft four times and twice driving off E-boats on 26 and 29 June. The destroyer evaded a torpedo fired by an E-boat on 27 June but was unable to return fire due to the escape of the E-boat. With the 2nd Destroyer Division of the Light Forces Detachment, she relocated to Tallinn on 30 June, escorting the cruiser Kirov through Moonsund. Stoyky grounded her right propeller in Moonsund on 12 July, knocking its shaft out of alignment. Sent to Kronstadt for repairs that lasted from 7 to 20 August, she had her right propeller shaft replaced by one from her sister ship Storozhevoy, among other modifications.

After taking aboard 75 mine protectors, Stoyky sortied with the minelayer Marti to lay mines off Gogland Island between 22 and 23 August, but she was forced to return to base after a storm prevented minelaying. Along with her sister Silny, she bombarded Finnish positions on the coast of Vyborg Bay between 25 and 27 August, expending 490 main-gun shells, in addition to another 60 against transports near Tranzund. Due to a lack of observations, the bombardment was ineffective. The destroyer laid 64 mines off Vigrund in Narva Bay on the night of 14 September, then remained in Leningrad between 15 September and 21 October during the siege of the city. During this period, she fired 576 high-explosive 130 mm shells in 54 bombardments and expended a dozen 130 mm, about two-hundred fifty 76 mm, more than one hundred 45 mm, seventy-eight 37 mm shells, and four-hundred forty 12.7 mm rounds in anti-aircraft fire. On several occasions the destroyer exchanged counter-battery fire with the assistance of forward observers. During one of these artillery duels on 6 October, a German 210 mm (8.3 in) shell ricocheted off the harbor retaining wall and passed through her hull, going through her several magazines and igniting a fire in her 12.7 mm ammunition. The magazines flooded through the exit hole, which prevented an explosion, while the 12.7 mm ammunition fire was extinguished by the crew. Within six minutes her moorings were slipped and Stoyky moved out of the shelling zone, although her propeller was damaged by contact with the pier due to the hasty departure; her crew lost nine wounded during the action.

After repairs at Shipyard No. 189, Stoyky departed Kronstadt for the evacuation of the Hanko Naval Base on the night of 1 November, along with her sister Slavny and Marti. Heavy seas made the use of her paravanes difficult, and the destroyer narrowly escaped a drifting mine. Arriving at Hanko on the morning of 2 November, the destroyers found themselves under constant artillery fire, but Stoyky managed to evacuate 500 soldiers with their rifles and three Maxim anti-aircraft guns to Kronstadt under the cover of darkness. A second sortie to Hanko proved unsuccessful due to a strong storm and snow, which forced the ships to turn back to Gogland, where the destroyer participated in the evacuation of the garrison of that island for the next several days. Stoyky and Slavny departed for another sortie to Hanko on 29 November with the transport Iosif Stalin and smaller vessels. The operations of the destroyer were hindered by the fouling of her boilers with saltwater due to lack of cleaning and a bent right-propeller shaft. Under fire, she evacuated about 500 soldiers from Hanko. The destroyer was fired on by Finnish 8-inch (203 mm) artillery batteries off Seivästö on 5 December; although ice floes prevented her from maneuvering, she silenced the guns with 68 main-gun shells.

After returning to Leningrad, Stoyky was repaired at Shipyard No. 194, but she saw little action for the rest of the war, expending 54 shells in three bombardments during 1942. Until 1944 she was on the Neva and the Bolshaya Nevka. For her combat performance in 1941, the destroyer was made a Guards ship on 3 April 1942 by the first order conferring the Guards title on ships, thus becoming the first Guards destroyer. On that day, her crew was credited with downing a German bomber with a heavy machine gun, the last time she put up anti-aircraft fire during the war. The destroyer was renamed Vitse-Admiral Drozd on 13 February 1943 in honor of the Baltic Fleet Squadron commander Valentin Drozd after his death. In 1943, she expended 94 shells in six operations, five training and one combat.

== Postwar ==
After the end of the war, Stoyky continued to serve with the Baltic Fleet, becoming part of the 4th Fleet between 25 February 1946 and 4 January 1956, when the latter was split. She underwent a major refit and modernization between 2 November 1951 and 7 February 1956. The destroyer was removed from the combat fleet and reclassified as target ship TsL-54 on 5 February 1960. She sank during a storm at Cape Taran on 26 June 1961. Raising the wreck was deemed impractical, and, on 28 September 1961, the ship was stricken from the navy list.

== Sources ==
- Balakin, Sergey (2007). Легендарные "семёрки" Эсминцы "сталинской" серии [Legendary Sevens: Stalin's Destroyer Series] (in Russian). Moscow: Yauza/Eksmo. ISBN 978-5-699-23784-5.
- Berezhnoy, Sergey (2002). Крейсера и миноносцы. Справочник [Guide to Cruisers and Destroyers] (in Russian). Moscow: Voenizdat. ISBN 5-203-01780-8.
- Chernyshev, Alexander (2009). 1941 год на Балтике : подвиг и трагедия [1941 in the Baltic: Feat and Tragedy] (in Russian). Moscow: Yauza/Eksmo. ISBN 978-5-699-34859-6.
- Hill, Alexander (2018). Soviet Destroyers of World War II. New Vanguard. Vol. 256. Oxford, UK: Osprey Publishing. ISBN 978-1-4728-2256-7.
- Rohwer, Jürgen & Monakov, Mikhail S. (2001). Stalin's Ocean-Going Fleet. London: Frank Cass. ISBN 0-7146-4895-7.
- Yakubov, Vladimir & Worth, Richard (2008). "The Soviet Project 7/7U Destroyers". In Jordan, John & Dent, Stephen (eds.). Warship 2008. London: Conway. pp. 99–114. ISBN 978-1-84486-062-3.
