= Soviet destroyer Svobodny (1940) =

Soviet destroyer

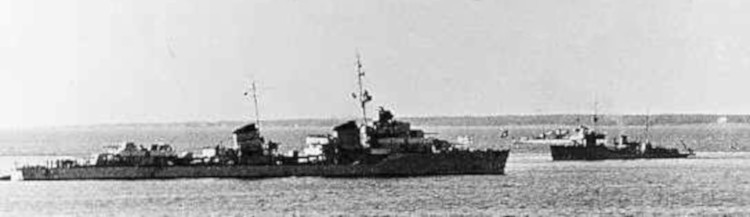
- An unidentified Storozhevoy-class destroyer in the Black Sea

History

Soviet Union
- Name: Svobodny (Свободный (Free))
- Ordered: 2nd Five-Year Plan
- Builder: Shipyard No. 200 (named after 61 Communards), Nikolayev; Shipyard No. 201 (Sergo Ordzhonikidze), Sevastopol
- Yard number: 246
- Laid down: 1938
- Launched: 25 February 1939
- Commissioned: 2 January 1942
- Fate: Sunk by aircraft, 10 June 1942; Wreck salvaged and scrapped, 1953

General characteristics (Storozhevoy, 1941)
- Class & type: Storozhevoy-class destroyer
- Displacement: 1,727 t (1,700 long tons) (standard); 2,279 t (2,243 long tons) (full load)
- Length: 112.5 m (369 ft 1 in) (o/a)
- Beam: 10.2 m (33 ft 6 in)
- Draft: 3.98 m (13 ft 1 in)
- Installed power: 4 water-tube boilers; 54,000 shp (40,000 kW) (trials)
- Propulsion: 2 shafts, 2 steam turbine sets
- Speed: 40.3 knots (74.6 km/h; 46.4 mph) (trials)
- Endurance: 1,380–2,700 nmi (2,560–5,000 km; 1,590–3,110 mi) at 19 knots (35 km/h; 22 mph)
- Complement: 207 (271 wartime)
- Sensors & processing systems: Mars hydrophones
- Armament: 4 × single 130 mm (5.1 in) guns; 2 × single 76.2 mm (3 in) AA guns; 3 × single 45 mm (1.8 in) AA guns; 4 × single 12.7 mm (0.50 in) DK or DShK machine guns; 2 × triple 533 mm (21 in) torpedo tubes; 58–96 mines; 30 depth charges

Svobodny (Russian: Свободный, lit. 'Free') was one of 18 Storozhevoy-class destroyers (officially known as Project 7U) built for the Soviet Navy during the late 1930s. Although she began construction as a Project 7 Gnevny-class destroyer, Svobodny was completed in early 1942 to the modified Project 7U design.

Still incomplete when Operation Barbarossa, the German invasion of the Soviet Union, began in June 1941, she had to be moved twice to prevent her capture by the Germans. Once completed, the destroyer began to transport supplies and troops into besieged Sevastopol and to provide naval gunfire support for the defenders of the city and Soviet troops in the Battle of the Kerch Peninsula. While moored there in early June, Svobodny sank after being struck by German bombs with the loss of 67 crewmen. Her wreck was refloated and scrapped in 1953.

== Design and description ==
Originally built as a Gnevny-class ship, Svobodny and her sister ships were completed to the modified Project 7U design after Joseph Stalin, General Secretary of the Communist Party of the Soviet Union, ordered that the latter be built with their boilers arranged en echelon, instead of linked as in the Gnevnys, so that a ship could still move with one or two boilers disabled.

Like the Gnevnys, the Project 7U destroyers had an overall length of 112.5 meters (369 ft 1 in) and a beam of 10.2 meters (33 ft 6 in), but they had a reduced draft of 3.98 meters (13 ft 1 in) at deep load. The ships were slightly overweight, displacing 1,727 metric tons (1,700 long tons) at standard load and 2,279 metric tons (2,243 long tons) at deep load. The crew complement of the Storozhevoy class numbered 207 in peacetime, but this increased to 271 in wartime, as more personnel were needed to operate additional equipment. Each ship had a pair of geared steam turbines, each driving one propeller, rated to produce 54,000 shaft horsepower (40,000 kW) using steam from four water-tube boilers, which the designers expected would exceed the 37-knot (69 km/h; 43 mph) speed of the Project 7s because there was additional steam available. Some fell short of it, although specific figures for most individual ships have not survived. Storozhevoy set the surviving top speed for the class in trials at 40.3 knots (74.6 km/h; 46.4 mph). Variations in fuel oil capacity meant that the range of the Project 7Us varied from 1,380 to 2,700 nautical miles (2,560 to 5,000 km; 1,590 to 3,110 mi) at 19 knots (35 km/h; 22 mph).

The Project 7U-class ships mounted four 130-millimeter (5.1 in) B-13 guns in two pairs of superfiring single mounts fore and aft of the superstructure. Anti-aircraft defense was provided by a pair of 76.2-millimeter (3 in) 34-K AA guns in single mounts and three 45-millimeter (1.8 in) 21-K AA guns, as well as four 12.7-millimeter (0.50 in) DK or DShK machine guns. They carried six 533 mm (21.0 in) torpedo tubes in two rotating triple mounts amidships. The ships could also carry a maximum of 58 to 96 mines and 30 depth charges. They were fitted with a set of Mars hydrophones for anti-submarine work, although these were useless at speeds over 3 knots (5.6 km/h; 3.5 mph). Due to her late completion, Svobodny was equipped with Soyuz-7U anti-aircraft fire control, uniquely among the Black Sea Fleet ships of her class.

== Construction and career ==
Svobodny was laid down at Shipyard No. 200 (named after 61 Communards) in Nikolayev with the yard number 1074 on 23 August 1936 as a Gnevny-class destroyer with the name Besshumny. She was relaid down as a Project 7U destroyer in 1938 at Shipyard No. 201 (Sergo Ordzhonikidze) in Sevastopol as yard number 246 and launched on 25 February 1939. The ship was renamed Svobodny on 25 September 1940 and was 83.8% complete when the Germans invaded the Soviet Union on 22 June 1941. To prevent her capture by the advancing German forces, the still-incomplete destroyer was towed to Sevastopol on 9 August without completing mooring trials and then to Poti, Georgia, on 2 November. Svobodny was accepted on 2 January 1942, and joined the Black Sea Fleet a week later.

She began ferrying supplies and personnel into besieged Sevastopol shortly afterwards, in addition to service as a convoy escort. The ship also bombarded German positions with 22 shells from her main guns on 18 January before beginning a brief refit in February. Svobodny resumed her previous duties and bombarded Axis positions on the coast of Feodosia Gulf on the night of 16 March. She fired 90 shells at German troops near Feodosia on 20 March and a total of 82 more shells on 2 and 10 April in support of Soviet troops during the Battle of the Kerch Peninsula. She towed the old destroyer Zheleznyakov, disabled by an accident, to Tuapse on 22 March. The destroyer fired 106 shells at Axis troops advancing on Sevastopol on 4 April. The ship was refitted again through early May. Resuming transport missions between Sevastopol and Caucasian ports, Svobodny, her sister Soobrazitelny, and the cruiser Voroshilov ferried the 9th Naval Infantry Brigade from Batumi to Sevastopol between 27 and 28 May. During this sortie, Svobodny claimed to have downed one of the two Heinkel He 111 bombers shot down.

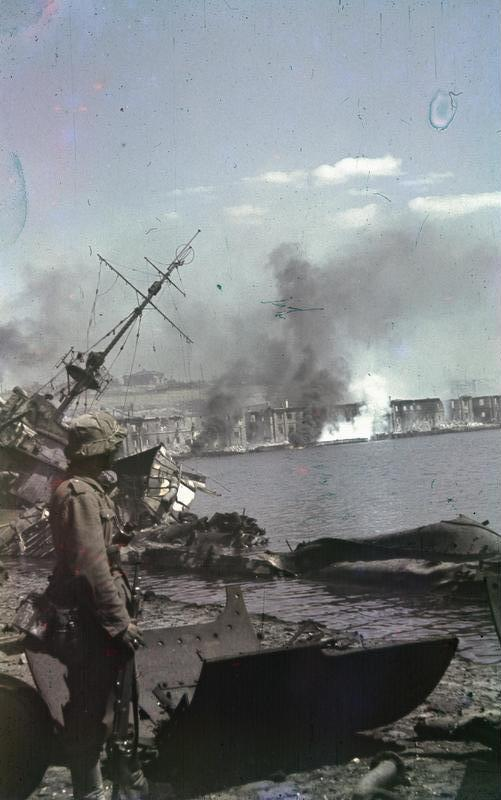
A German soldier standing in front of the wreck of Svobodny, July 1942

Svobodny departed from Novorossiysk as an escort for the transport Abkhaziya on 9 June, and was attacked by German bombers from II./KG 26 that night, although the two dozen torpedoes dropped by the latter missed. Both ships moored in Severnaya Bay in Sevastopol on the night of 9–10 June, where the destroyer finished unloading ammunition destined for the garrison by 04:30 on 10 June. She then bombarded German positions in the Mekenziev mountains, firing 400 shells, and was soon targeted by German bombers. Initial raids failed to hit the destroyer, but when Soviet smoke screens were lifted at 06:40 after German tanks attacked under their cover she moved to Korabelnaya Bay, where she was moored at the wharf. At 8:00 the German air attacks resumed, this time composed of Junkers Ju 87 dive bombers, whose bombs exploded much closer to Svobodny, inflicting casualties from fragments. About two and a half hours later, her hull was holed by near misses.

At 13:15, the destroyer was attacked from multiple directions by an entire gruppe of Ju 87s, whose bombs scored nine direct hits, which started massive fires that detonated anti-aircraft ammunition. Sixty-seven crewmen were killed and many wounded, with her captain among the latter. The survivors abandoned ship just before her torpedoes and aft magazine exploded. Svobodny sank with a 50° list, with the forward superstructure unsubmerged; the latter burned for three days. One hundred and one survivors were returned to the Caucasus aboard the cruiser Molotov three days later. Svobodny was struck from the Soviet Navy on 24 June. The wreck was raised by the Emergency Rescue Service of the Black Sea Fleet and scrapped at the Sevastopol Glavvtorchermet base in Inkerman during early 1953.

== Sources ==
- Balakin, Sergey (2007). Легендарные "семёрки" Эсминцы "сталинской" серии [Legendary Sevens: Stalin's Destroyer Series] (in Russian). Moscow: Yauza/Eksmo. ISBN 978-5-699-23784-5.
- Berezhnoy, Sergey (2002). Крейсера и миноносцы. Справочник [Guide to Cruisers and Destroyers] (in Russian). Moscow: Voenizdat. ISBN 5-203-01780-8.
- Forczyk, Robert (2013). Where the Iron Crosses Grow: The Crimea 1941–44. Oxford: Osprey. ISBN 978-1-78200-975-7.
- Hill, Alexander (2018). Soviet Destroyers of World War II. New Vanguard. Vol. 256. Oxford, UK: Osprey Publishing. ISBN 978-1-4728-2256-7.
- Platonov, Andrey V. (2002). Энциклопедия советских надводных кораблей 1941–1945 [Encyclopedia of Soviet Surface Ships 1941–1945] (in Russian). Saint Petersburg: Poligon. ISBN 5-89173-178-9.
- Rohwer, Jürgen (2005). Chronology of the War at Sea 1939–1945: The Naval History of World War Two (Third Revised ed.). Annapolis, Maryland: Naval Institute Press. ISBN 1-59114-119-2.
- Yakubov, Vladimir & Worth, Richard (2008). "The Soviet Project 7/7U Destroyers". In Jordan, John & Dent, Stephen (eds.). Warship 2008. London: Conway. pp. 99–114. ISBN 978-1-84486-062-3.
