= Ognevoy-class destroyer =

Soviet destroyers built 1938–1948

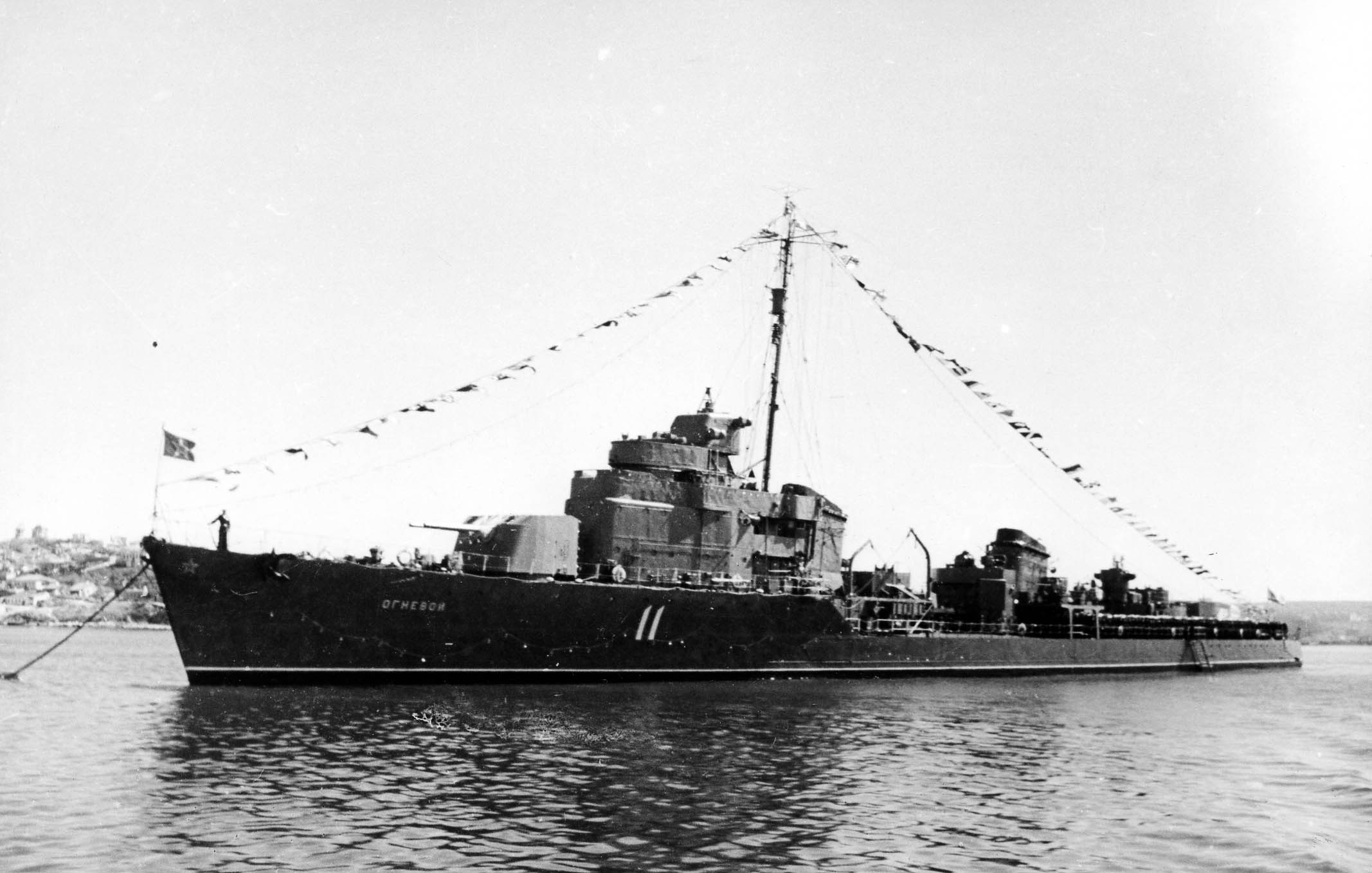
- Ognevoy at Sevastopol on 1 May 1947

Class overview
- Name: Ognevoy class (Project 30)
- Operators: Soviet Navy; Bulgarian Navy
- Preceded by: Soobrazitelnyy class
- Succeeded by: Skory class
- Subclasses: Project 30, Project 30K
- Built: 1938–1948
- In service: 1945–1966
- Planned: 24
- Completed: 11
- Canceled: 13
- Scrapped: 11

General characteristics (Project 30K)
- Type: Destroyer
- Displacement: 2,125 t (2,091 long tons) (standard)
- Length: 117 m (383 ft 10 in) (o/a)
- Beam: 11 m (36 ft 1 in)
- Draught: 4.25 m (13 ft 11 in)
- Installed power: 4 water-tube boilers; 54,000 shp (40,000 kW)
- Propulsion: 2 shafts; 2 geared steam turbines
- Speed: 36.5 knots (67.6 km/h; 42.0 mph)
- Range: 2,950 nmi (5,460 km; 3,390 mi) at 16.9 knots (31.3 km/h; 19.4 mph)
- Complement: 20 officers and 281 crewmen
- Sensors & processing systems: Gyuis-1b, Ryf-1 radars; Vympel-2 gunnery radar; Tamir-5N sonar
- Armament: 2 × twin 130 mm (5.1 in) guns; 2 × single 85 mm (3.3 in) AA guns; 6 × single 37 mm (1.5 in) AA guns; 2 × triple 533 mm (21 in) torpedo tubes; 52–60 mines; 22 × depth charges, 2 × depth charge launchers

The Ognevoy-class destroyers consisted of 26 destroyers built for the Soviet Navy during and immediately after World War II. The official Soviet designation was Project 30 and Project 30K. Construction was disrupted by the invasion of the Soviet Union in 1941 (Operation Barbarossa) and many ships were cancelled or scrapped. Only a single ship was completed during the war and the other 10 were finished in 1947–1950.

The Project 7 destroyers proved to have a less than adequate seaworthiness for Soviet conditions. The Soviets decided to build a larger ship with main armament in enclosed turrets. These ships proved popular with the Soviet Navy and formed the basis for the post-war Skory class or Project 30bis.

== Design ==
The specification (TTZ in Russian) for these ships was issued by the Naval staff in November 1937. The design work was done by Zhdanov Yard in Leningrad under the leadership of A. Yunovidova and approved by the government in 1939.

Hull strength was significantly increased and the hull was enlarged compared to the Project 7 ships. Longitudinal framing was used and hull plating was thicker than the Project 7 ships. Hull height was increased giving extra free board.

The machinery consisted of two boiler rooms and two engine rooms similar to the Project 7U destroyers but in less cramped spaces. Electricity generation capacity was increased to two 100 kW (130 hp) plants and two 50 kW (67 hp) plants. An alternative design Project 30A using super-heated high pressure machinery based on American designs was projected but not built.

The armament was housed in two enclosed splinter-proof and weatherproof turrets in 'A' and 'Y' positions. This was a significant advance over the open mountings used in the Project 7 ships. The B-2LM turrets were introduced in the Tashkent class and proven successful in service but had no anti-aircraft capability. Anti-aircraft armament comprised two 85 mm (3.3 in) guns in a twin mounting in 'X' position and six 37 mm (1.5 in) guns in single mountings. The ships also carried two sets of quadruple torpedo tubes and 50 mines.

The ships were fitted with air warning, surface search and gunnery control radars and sonar after the war.

== Ships ==
24 ships were ordered in 1938–1940 but the programme was disrupted by the German invasion in 1941. The ships being built in Nikolayev were demolished before launch or evacuated incomplete while those built in other yards were suspended for the duration of the conflict. Some of the intact ships were completed after the war to a modified design (K for korrektirovany – corrected).

Construction data
Ship	Builder	Laid down	Launched	Commissioned	Fate
Project 30
Ognevoy (Огневой, Fiery)	Shipyard No. 200 (61 Communards), Nikolayev	20 November 1939	12 November 1940	22 March 1945	Struck, 1960s
Organizovanny (Организованный, Organized)	Shipyard No. 189 (Sergo Ordzhonikidze), Leningrad	21 March 1941			Suspended 20 June 1941, bow removed September 1943 to repair badly damaged Project 7U destroyer Storozhevoy
Project 30-K
Ozornoy (Озорной, Mischievous)	Shipyard No. 200 (61 Communards), Nikolayev	20 November 1939	25 December 1940	9 January 1949	Transferred to the Bulgarian Navy, 25 March 1950 as Georgi Dimitrov, scrapped 1963
Otverzhdyonny (Отверждённый, hardened)	Sevastapol Navy dockyard			1947	Not completed
Osmotritelny (Осмотрительный, Observant)	Shipyard No. 189 (Sergo Ordzhonikidze), Leningrad	5 May 1940	24 August 1947	29 September 1947	Struck, 1966
Otlichny (Отличный, Excellent)	Shipyard No. 190 (Zhdanov), Leningrad	2 December 1939	7 May 1947	30 October 1948	Struck, 1966
Obraztsovy (Образцовый, Exemplary)	Shipyard No. 190 (Zhdanov), Leningrad	2 December 1939	30 July 1947	29 December 1949	Struck, 20 June 1971
Otvazhny (Отважный, Courageous)	Shipyard No. 190 (Zhdanov), Leningrad	30 July 1940	2 January 1948	2 March 1950	Struck, 1966
Odaryonny (Одарённый, Gifted)	Shipyard No. 190 (Zhdanov), Leningrad	30 December 1939	27 December 1948	28 June 1950	Struck, 1965
Stalin (Сталин)	Shipyard No. 402, Molotovsk	25 June 1940	19 July 1947	29 September 1949	scrapped in the 1960s
Osmotritelny	Shipyard No. 402, Molotovsk	5 May 1940	24 August 1947	29 September 1949	Struck, 1966
Vnushitelny (Внушительный, Imposing)	Shipyard No. 199, Komsomolsk-on-Amur	16 December 1940	14 May 1947	29 December 1947	Struck, 1960
Vlastny (Властный, Powerful)	Shipyard No. 199, Komsomolsk-on-Amur	29 October 1940	15 June 1948	27 December 1948	Struck, 30 August 1960
Vynoslivy (Выносливый, Hardy)	Shipyard No. 199, Komsomolsk-on-Amur	29 October 1940	17 November 1947	5 December 1948	Struck, 30 August 1960

== Service history ==
Ognevoy's hull was towed to Poti, Georgia; her turrets were salvaged from the wreck of the destroyer Tashkent.
