= Soviet destroyer Sovershenny (1940) =

Soviet destroyer

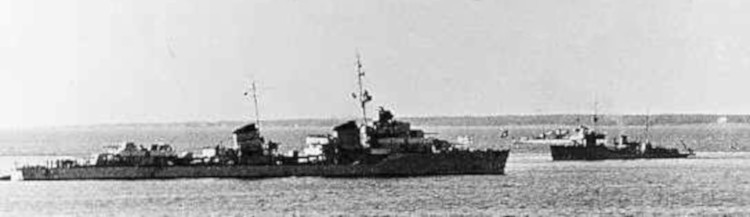
- An unidentified Storozhevoy-class destroyer in the Black Sea

History

Soviet Union
- Name: Sovershenny (Совершенный (Absolute))
- Ordered: 2nd Five-Year Plan
- Builder: Shipyard No. 200 (named after 61 Communards), Nikolayev; Shipyard No. 201 (Sergo Ordzhonikidze), Sevastopol
- Yard number: 245
- Laid down: 1938
- Launched: 25 February 1939
- Fate: Sunk by artillery, 8 June 1942; Wreck salvaged and scrapped, 28 October 1945

General characteristics (Storozhevoy, 1941)
- Class & type: Storozhevoy-class destroyer
- Displacement: 1,727 t (1,700 long tons) (standard); 2,279 t (2,243 long tons) (full load)
- Length: 112.5 m (369 ft 1 in) (o/a)
- Beam: 10.2 m (33 ft 6 in)
- Draft: 3.98 m (13 ft 1 in)
- Installed power: 4 water-tube boilers; 54,000 shp (40,000 kW) (trials)
- Propulsion: 2 shafts, 2 steam turbine sets
- Speed: 40.3 knots (74.6 km/h; 46.4 mph) (trials)
- Endurance: 2,700 nmi (5,000 km; 3,100 mi) at 19 knots (35 km/h; 22 mph)
- Complement: 207 (271 wartime)
- Sensors & processing systems: Mars hydrophones
- Armament: 4 × single 130 mm (5.1 in) guns; 2 × single 76.2 mm (3 in) AA guns; 3 × single 45 mm (1.8 in) AA guns; 4 × single 12.7 mm (0.5 in) DK or DShK machine guns; 2 × triple 533 mm (21 in) torpedo tubes; 58–96 mines; 30 depth charges

Sovershenny (Russian: Совершенный, lit. 'Absolute') was one of 18 Storozhevoy-class destroyer (officially known as Project 7U) built for the Soviet Navy during the late 1930s. Although she began construction as a Project 7 Gnevny-class destroyer, Sovershenny was completed in 1941 to the modified Project 7U design. The ship struck a mine while running her acceptance trials in September. While under repair in November, she was hit by two bombs that virtually wrecked her; the Soviets subsequently disarmed her. Repairs resumed in early 1942 until Sovershenny was sunk by an artillery shell in June. Her wreck was scrapped in late 1945.

== Design and description ==
Originally built as a Gnevny-class ship, Sovershenny and her sister ships were completed to the modified Project 7U design after Joseph Stalin, General Secretary of the Communist Party of the Soviet Union, ordered that the latter be built with their boilers arranged en echelon, instead of linked as in the Gnevnys, so that a ship could still move with one or two boilers disabled.

Like the Gnevnys, the Project 7U destroyers had an overall length of 112.5 meters (369 ft 1 in) and a beam of 10.2 meters (33 ft 6 in), but they had a reduced draft of 3.98 meters (13 ft 1 in) at deep load. The ships were slightly overweight, displacing 1,727 metric tons (1,700 long tons) at standard load and 2,279 metric tons (2,243 long tons) at deep load. The crew complement of the Storozhevoy class numbered 207 in peacetime, but this increased to 271 in wartime, as more personnel were needed to operate additional equipment. Each ship had a pair of geared steam turbines, each driving one propeller, rated to produce 54,000 shaft horsepower (40,000 kW) using steam from four water-tube boilers, which the designers expected would exceed the 37-knot (69 km/h; 43 mph) speed of the Project 7s because there was additional steam available. Sovershenny reached 36 knots (67 km/h; 41 mph) in trials. Variations in fuel oil capacity meant that the range of the Project 7Us varied from 1,380 to 2,700 nautical miles (2,560 to 5,000 km; 1,590 to 3,110 mi) at 19 knots (35 km/h; 22 mph).

The Project 7U-class ships mounted four 130-millimeter (5.1 in) B-13 guns in two pairs of superfiring single mounts fore and aft of the superstructure. Anti-aircraft defense was provided by a pair of 76.2-millimeter (3 in) 34-K anti-aircraft (AA) guns in single mounts and three 45-millimeter (1.8 in) 21-K AA guns, as well as four 12.7-millimeter (0.5 in) DK or DShK machine guns. They carried six 533 mm (21 in) torpedo tubes in two rotating triple mounts amidships. The ships could also carry a maximum of 58 to 96 mines and 30 depth charges. They were fitted with a set of Mars hydrophones for anti-submarine work, although these were useless at speeds over 3 knots (5.6 km/h; 3.5 mph).

== Construction and career ==
Sovershenny was laid down at Shipyard No. 200 (named after 61 Communards) in Nikolayev as yard number 1073 on 17 September 1936 as a Gnevny-class destroyer with the name Besstrashny. She was relaid down as a Project 7U destroyer in 1938 and launched on 25 February 1939. After launching, she was transferred to Shipyard No. 201 (Sergo Ordzhonikidze) in Sevastopol as yard number 245 for completion. The ship was renamed Sovershenny on 25 September 1940 and was 90% complete when the Germans invaded the Soviet Union on 22 June 1941 (Operation Barbarossa). She began acceptance trials during September. While conducting trials off Chersonesus on 30 September, the day slated for her official acceptance by the navy, she accidentally entered a Soviet minefield. At 16:42, the ship struck a mine that blew a 30-square-meter (320 sq ft) hole in her hull, which flooded both forward boiler rooms and the forward engine room, in addition to starting a fire in one of the forward boiler rooms. The destroyer lost power and took on 1,000 metric tons (980 long tons) of water. After an attempt by the rescue tug Merkury to pump out the flooded compartments, Sovershenny was towed into the shallows of Kazachya bay for the night due to fears of her sinking from loss of reserve buoyancy. On the next morning, pontoons were placed under the hull and she was towed back to Sevastopol, being placed in a floating dock to patch the hole in her hull on 2 October. The destroyer was subsequently transferred to the drydock of Shipyard No. 201.

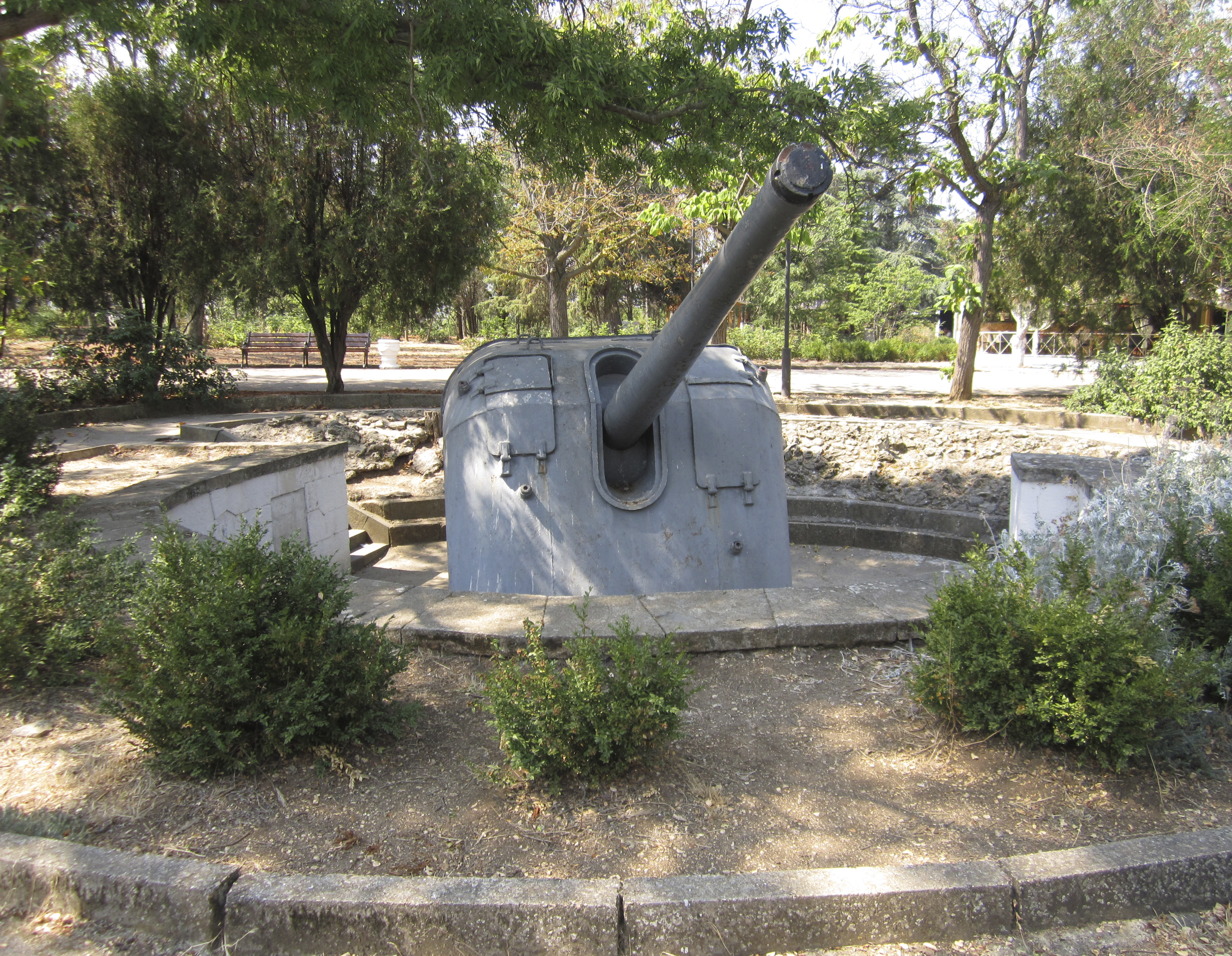
A 130 mm gun from Sovershenny used by a battery on Malakhov Kurgan

During an attack by German aircraft on 12 November, the destroyer was struck by two bombs during a raid by Heinkel He 111s of the First Group of Kampfgeschwader 27 (I./KG 27) and Junkers Ju 88s of KG 51. The bombs broke Sovershenny's back, already weakened by the mine explosion, and started extensive fires fueled by remaining oil in her tanks, which burned out her stern. They also damaged the drydock so that it flooded and the water gave the ship a 25° list. Two days later, she was struck by a pair of 150 mm (5.9 in) artillery shells. Sovershenny was disarmed in early December and her main guns were used to form a coastal artillery battery, positioned on Malakhov kurgan and manned by 65 of her sailors. The drydock was repaired and drained on 20 February 1942, after which repairs resumed, which reconstructed her hull in two months. Sovershenny was removed from drydock in early May and moored in Korabelnaya bay for completion, but in early June she was damaged by several near misses from bombs and another landed in a boiler room. The explosion of a German heavy artillery shell near a starboard boiler room on 15 June holed the ship, causing flooding that tugboats failed to pump out, and Sovershenny sank with only her forward superstructure unsubmerged. (Note: Platonov states that she was sunk on 8 June.) After the end of the war, her wreck was refloated by an emergency rescue detachment of the Black Sea Fleet on 28 October 1945; she was deemed irreparable and struck from the Soviet Navy on 27 December of that year, being sent to the Sevastopol Glavvtorchermet base at Inkerman for scrapping.

== Sources ==
- Balakin, Sergey (2007). Легендарные "семёрки" Эсминцы "сталинской" серии [Legendary Sevens: Stalin's Destroyer Series] (in Russian). Moscow: Yauza/Eksmo. ISBN 978-5-699-23784-5.
- Berezhnoy, Sergey (2002). Крейсера и миноносцы. Справочник [Guide to Cruisers and Destroyers] (in Russian). Moscow: Voenizdat. ISBN 5-203-01780-8.
- Forczyk, Robert (2014). Where the Iron Crosses Grow: The Crimea 1941–44. Oxford: Osprey. ISBN 978-1-78200-975-7.
- Hill, Alexander (2018). Soviet Destroyers of World War II. New Vanguard. Vol. 256. Oxford, UK: Osprey Publishing. ISBN 978-1-4728-2256-7.
- Platonov, Andrey V. (2002). Энциклопедия советских надводных кораблей 1941–1945 [Encyclopedia of Soviet Surface Ships 1941–1945] (in Russian). Saint Petersburg: Poligon. ISBN 5-89173-178-9.
- Rohwer, Jürgen (2005). Chronology of the War at Sea 1939–1945: The Naval History of World War Two (Third Revised ed.). Annapolis, Maryland: Naval Institute Press. ISBN 1-59114-119-2.
- Rohwer, Jürgen & Monakov, Mikhail S. (2001). Stalin's Ocean-Going Fleet. London: Frank Cass. ISBN 0-7146-4895-7.
- Yakubov, Vladimir & Worth, Richard (2008). "The Soviet Project 7/7U Destroyers". In Jordan, John & Dent, Stephen (eds.). Warship 2008. London: Conway. pp. 99–114. ISBN 978-1-84486-062-3.
