= Soviet destroyer Slavny (1939) =

Soviet destroyer

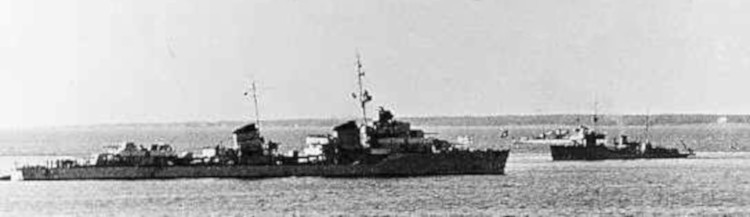
- An unidentified Storozhevoy-class destroyer in the Black Sea

History

Soviet Union
- Name: Slavny (Славный (Glorious))
- Ordered: 2nd Five-Year Plan
- Builder: Shipyard No. 189 (Sergo Ordzhonikidze), Leningrad
- Yard number: 293
- Laid down: 31 January 1939
- Launched: 19 September 1939
- Commissioned: 31 May 1941
- Renamed: As TsL-44, 6 February 1960; As SM-20, 30 June 1961
- Reclassified: As a target ship, 6 February 1960
- Stricken: 4 March 1964
- Fate: Scrapped, 1964–1965

General characteristics (Storozhevoy, 1941)
- Class & type: Storozhevoy-class destroyer
- Displacement: 1,727 t (1,700 long tons) (standard); 2,279 t (2,243 long tons) (full load)
- Length: 112.5 m (369 ft 1 in) (o/a)
- Beam: 10.2 m (33 ft 6 in)
- Draft: 3.98 m (13 ft 1 in)
- Installed power: 4 water-tube boilers; 54,000 shp (40,000 kW) (trials)
- Propulsion: 2 shafts, 2 steam turbine sets
- Speed: 40.3 knots (74.6 km/h; 46.4 mph) (trials)
- Endurance: 2,700 nmi (5,000 km; 3,100 mi) at 19 knots (35 km/h; 22 mph)
- Complement: 207 (271 wartime)
- Sensors & processing systems: Mars hydrophones
- Armament: 4 × single 130 mm (5.1 in) guns; 2 × single 76.2 mm (3 in) AA guns; 3 × single 45 mm (1.8 in) AA guns; 4 × single 12.7 mm (0.50 in) DK or DShK machine guns; 2 × triple 533 mm (21 in) torpedo tubes; 58–96 mines; 30 depth charges

Slavny (Russian: Славный, lit. 'Glorious') was one of 18 Storozhevoy-class destroyers (officially known as Project 7U) built for the Soviet Navy during the late 1930s. Although she began construction as a Project 7 Gnevny-class destroyer, Slavny was completed in 1941 to the modified Project 7U design.

Entering service with the Baltic Fleet just before the beginning of Operation Barbarossa, she participated in minelaying operations and provided naval gunfire support from late June to early August. She was damaged by mines during the Evacuation of Tallinn, Estonia, later that month, returning to Leningrad for repairs that lasted for most of September. After a month of shore bombardments during the Siege of Leningrad, the destroyer participated in the evacuation of Hanko Naval Base in November and December, suffering damage that forced her to put in for repairs twice. Seeing little action in 1942 and 1943, the destroyer conducted her last shore bombardment during the Vyborg–Petrozavodsk Offensive in 1944. She continued to serve with the Baltic Fleet postwar and spent the late 1940s and early 1950s under refit and modernization. Converted to a target ship in the early 1960s, she was scrapped between 1964 and 1965.

== Design and description ==
Originally built as a Gnevny-class ship, Slavny and her sister ships were completed to the modified Project 7U design after Joseph Stalin, General Secretary of the Communist Party of the Soviet Union, ordered that the latter be built with their boilers arranged en echelon, instead of linked as in the Gnevnys, so that a ship could still move with one or two boilers disabled.

Like the Gnevnys, the Project 7U destroyers had an overall length of 112.5 meters (369 ft 1 in) and a beam of 10.2 meters (33 ft 6 in), but they had a reduced draft of 3.98 meters (13 ft 1 in) at deep load. The ships were slightly overweight, displacing 1,727 metric tons (1,700 long tons) at standard load and 2,279 metric tons (2,243 long tons) at deep load. The crew complement of the Storozhevoy class numbered 207 in peacetime, but this increased to 271 in wartime, as more personnel were needed to operate additional equipment. Each ship had a pair of geared steam turbines, each driving one propeller, rated to produce 54,000 shaft horsepower (40,000 kW) using steam from four water-tube boilers, which the designers expected would exceed the 37-knot (69 km/h; 43 mph) speed of the Project 7s because there was additional steam available. Some fell short of it, although specific figures for most individual ships have not survived. Variations in fuel oil capacity meant that the range of the Project 7Us varied from 1,380 to 2,700 nautical miles (2,560 to 5,000 km; 1,590 to 3,110 mi) at 19 knots (35 km/h; 22 mph), that upper figure demonstrated by Storozhevoy.

The Project 7U-class ships mounted four 130-millimeter (5.1 in) B-13 guns in two pairs of superfiring single mounts fore and aft of the superstructure. Anti-aircraft defense was provided by a pair of 76.2-millimeter (3 in) 34-K AA guns in single mounts and three 45-millimeter (1.8 in) 21-K AA guns, as well as four 12.7-millimeter (0.50 in) DK or DShK machine guns. They carried six 533 mm (21.0 in) torpedo tubes in two rotating triple mounts amidships. The ships could also carry a maximum of 58 to 96 mines and 30 depth charges. They were fitted with a set of Mars hydrophones for anti-submarine work, although these were useless at speeds over 3 knots (5.6 km/h; 3.5 mph).

=== Modifications ===
During repairs after she was hit by a shell in May 1943, Slavny was fitted with a British Lend-Lease Type 128 Asdic system. In 1944–1945, the ship had exchanged both of her 21-K mounts for six 37-millimeter (1.5 in) 70-K AA guns in single mounts and an additional 34-K mount. By the end of the war, she had received a radar of unknown type. After the war, all of her AA guns were replaced by eight water-cooled V-11M versions of the 70-K gun in twin mounts.

== Construction and World War II ==
Slavny was laid down at Shipyard No. 189 (Sergo Ordzhonikidze) in Leningrad as yard number 293 on 31 August 1936 as a Gnevny-class destroyer. She was relaid down as a Project 7U destroyer on 31 January 1939, and launched on 19 September. Accepted by a state commission on 31 May 1941, she joined the 5th Destroyer Division of the Baltic Fleet on 19 June when the Soviet naval jack was raised aboard her, based at Kronstadt. When Operation Barbarossa, the German invasion of the Soviet Union, began on 22 June, Slavny was at sea near the Hanko Peninsula. She participated in minelaying operations at the mouth of the Gulf of Finland on 27 and 29 June, then escorted the battleship Oktyabrskaya Revolutsiya from Tallinn to Kronstadt with her sister ship Svirepy on 1 July. During these operations the destroyer discovered submarines four times, attacking them without result.

Remaining at Kronstadt until 16 July, Slavny was based at Tallinn between 18 July and the Evacuation of Tallinn on 28 August. The destroyer fought in the defense of Tallinn, regularly conducting shore bombardments and providing anti-aircraft fire, receiving minor damage from a close bomb explosion on 26 August. During this period, she expended four hundred and sixteen 130 mm, one hundred and fifty-three 76 mm, and two hundred and twenty-eight 45 mm shells as well as more than a thousand 12.7 mm rounds. The destroyer departed Tallinn for Kronstadt late on 28 August with the covering force, fighting off two German air attacks that day. She drove off German S-boats at 18:47 with 39 main-gun shells, but two mines exploded in her paravanes 10 to 15 m (33 to 49 ft) from the hull at 20:23 and 21:35. The shockwaves from these explosions opened seams between the hull plates, causing the flooding of the fire-control compartment, two gun compartments, and the double-bottom tanks below the forward boiler room. Both rangefinders were disabled along with auxiliary mechanisms and electronic navigation devices. Slavny anchored and resumed the voyage at 06:00 on the next day, arriving at Kronstadt on the evening of 29 August after escaping from three air raids along the way. She expended one hundred and forty 76 mm and one hundred sixty-six 45 mm shells in addition to seven hundred forty-four 12.7 mm rounds during the evacuation.

After repairs, Slavny returned to duty by 21 September, evading one German air raid by maneuvering in the Kronstadt roadstead. During a second raid, a nearby bomb explosion sent splinters that punctured a superheated steam pipe in a boiler room and the shockwave damaged two boilers; the steam scalded three sailors, one of whom died of burns and three others were wounded by splinters. The raids continued until 4 October; she expended five hundred fifty-six 76 mm and eight hundred twenty-five 45 mm shells against them in addition to almost two thousand 12.7 mm rounds and was credited with shooting down one bomber. The destroyer suffered no further bomb damage, but was hit by fragments from a long-range shell that exploded in the water on 2 October. During October, she provided gunfire support 33 times from the Kronstadt roadstead, expending 409 shells from her main guns.

From November to early December, the destroyer participated in the evacuation of the Hanko Naval Base. She steamed to the base with her sister Stoyky and the minelayer Marti on 1 November, evacuating 657 troops with weapons and equipment to Leningrad on 4 November. On the return voyage she mistook the subchaser MO-112 for a Finnish torpedo boat and sank her. The destroyer damaged her port screw in an anti-submarine net at Kronstadt on 11 November, which forced her to be docked for repairs. She later escorted transports to Gogland, and on 29 November returned to Hanko for the second time, loading 856 troops under enemy fire. On the night of 3 December, Slavny attempted to assist the transport Iosif Stalin after the latter struck two mines, but another explosion broke off the transport's bow and she turned the transport over to a tugboat. The destroyer's wheel jammed after a Gall chain broke the next day, reducing the ship to a speed of three to four knots (5.6 to 7.4 km/h; 3.5 to 4.6 mph). Engaged multiple times by Finnish coastal artillery en route without success, Slavny arrived at Kronstadt on the evening of 5 December. After relocating to Leningrad on 16 December, the destroyer was put in for repairs at Shipyard No. 196. In six months of combat, she had steamed 3,707 nmi (6,865 km; 4,266 mi) in 67 days of steaming, expanding 966 main-gun rounds and 1,003 shells from her 76 mm guns.

During 1942 and 1943, Slavny did not directly participate in hostilities except for anti-aircraft fire during several air raids. She was hit by two German shells that started a boiler room fire on 1 May 1942, and moved to Kronstadt on 25 July. Equipment on her forecastle was damaged on 25 October when a large German shell struck the capstan compartment. Relocating to Leningrad in early November, the destroyer remained there for the next year. Seven sailors were killed and three wounded when a German shell struck the superstructure near the aft boiler room on 1 May 1943, after which she was repaired. During 1942 and 1943, the ship expended a hundred 130 mm shells in gunnery training. Her guns opened fire for the last time on 10 June 1944 during the Vyborg–Petrozavodsk Offensive.

== Postwar ==
Postwar, Slavny was planned to be transferred to the Polish Navy along with a number of smaller vessels, but for unknown reasons the transfer was cancelled at the last minute after a Soviet force had already arrived at Hel and Gdynia on 7 September 1945. She then became part of the 4th Fleet from 25 February 1946 to 4 January 1956 when the Baltic Fleet was split. She was refitted and modernized at Shipyard No. 890 in Tallinn between 10 July 1947 and 6 July 1955. The destroyer was removed from the combat fleet and reclassified as the target ship TsL-44 on 6 February 1960, and on 30 June 1961 as the floating target SM-20. Struck from the Navy List on 4 March 1964, she was scrapped at Liepāja between 1964 and 1965.

== Sources ==
- Balakin, Sergey (2007). Легендарные "семёрки" Эсминцы "сталинской" серии [Legendary Sevens: Stalin's Destroyer Series] (in Russian). Moscow: Yauza/Eksmo. ISBN 978-5-699-23784-5.
- Berezhnoy, Sergey (2002). Крейсера и миноносцы. Справочник [Guide to Cruisers and Destroyers] (in Russian). Moscow: Voenizdat. ISBN 5-203-01780-8.
- Hill, Alexander (2018). Soviet Destroyers of World War II. New Vanguard. Vol. 256. Oxford, UK: Osprey Publishing. ISBN 978-1-4728-2256-7.
- Platonov, Andrey V. (2002). Энциклопедия советских надводных кораблей 1941–1945 [Encyclopedia of Soviet Surface Ships 1941–1945] (in Russian). Saint Petersburg: Poligon. ISBN 5-89173-178-9.
- Rohwer, Jürgen (2005). Chronology of the War at Sea 1939–1945: The Naval History of World War Two (Third Revised ed.). Annapolis, Maryland: Naval Institute Press. ISBN 1-59114-119-2.
- Rohwer, Jürgen & Monakov, Mikhail S. (2001). Stalin's Ocean-Going Fleet. London: Frank Cass. ISBN 0-7146-4895-7.
- Yakubov, Vladimir & Worth, Richard (2008). "The Soviet Project 7/7U Destroyers". In Jordan, John & Dent, Stephen (eds.). Warship 2008. London: Conway. pp. 99–114. ISBN 978-1-84486-062-3.
- Budzbon, Przemyslaw; Radziemski, Jan; Twardowski, Marek (2022). Warships of the Soviet Fleets 1939–1945. Pen and Sword Ltd. ISBN 978-1-5267-5195-9.
- Bartelski, Andrzej (April 2015). "Przyczynek do historii ORP Sławny" [A contribution to the history of ORP Sławny]. Okręty Wojenne (in Polish). Tarnowskie Góry: Wydawnictwo. ISSN 1231-014X.
