= Soviet destroyer Serdity (1940) =

Russian Storozhevoy-class destroyers

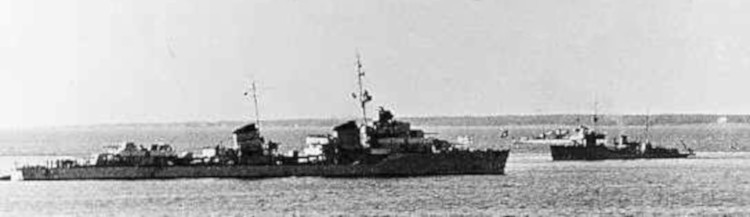
- An unidentified Storozhevoy-class destroyer in the Black Sea

History

Soviet Union
- Name: Serdity (Сердитый (Enraged))
- Ordered: 2nd Five-Year Plan
- Builder: Shipyard No. 189 (Sergo Ordzhonikidze), Leningrad
- Yard number: 298
- Laid down: 15 October 1938
- Launched: 21 April 1939
- Completed: 15 October 1940
- Commissioned: 12 April 1941
- Fate: Sunk by aircraft, 19 July 1941

General characteristics (Storozhevoy, 1941)
- Class & type: Storozhevoy-class destroyer
- Displacement: 1,727 t (1,700 long tons) (standard); 2,279 t (2,243 long tons) (full load)
- Length: 112.5 m (369 ft 1 in) (o/a)
- Beam: 10.2 m (33 ft 6 in)
- Draft: 3.98 m (13 ft 1 in)
- Installed power: 4 water-tube boilers; 54,000 shp (40,000 kW) (trials)
- Propulsion: 2 shafts, 2 steam turbine sets
- Speed: 38 knots (70 km/h; 44 mph)
- Endurance: 1,800 nmi (3,300 km; 2,100 mi) at 19 knots (35 km/h; 22 mph)
- Complement: 207 (271 wartime)
- Sensors & processing systems: Mars hydrophones
- Armament: 4 × single 130 mm (5.1 in) guns; 2 × single 76.2 mm (3 in) AA guns; 3 × single 45 mm (1.8 in) AA guns; 4 × single 12.7 mm (0.50 in) DK or DShK machine guns; 2 × triple 533 mm (21 in) torpedo tubes; 58–96 mines; 30 depth charges

Serdity (Russian: Сердитый, lit. 'Enraged') was one of 18 Storozhevoy-class destroyers (officially known as Project 7U) built for the Soviet Navy during the late 1930s. Although she began construction as a Project 7 Gnevny-class destroyer, Serdity was completed in 1940 to the modified Project 7U design.

Serving with the Baltic Fleet, she participated in minelaying operations after the start of the German invasion of the Soviet Union (Operation Barbarossa) in June 1941. Serdity engaged German minesweepers in the Irbe Strait on 6 July without result, and on 18 July was damaged by a friendly air attack. While anchored off Hiiumaa the following day, she was sunk by German bombers. Her survivors were taken off by other destroyers and what remained of the ship was broken up for scrap postwar.

== Design ==
Originally built as a Gnevny-class ship, Serdity and her sister ships were completed to the modified Project 7U design after Joseph Stalin, General Secretary of the Communist Party of the Soviet Union, ordered that the latter be built with their boilers arranged en echelon, instead of linked as in the Gnevnys, so that a ship could still move with one or two boilers disabled.

Like the Gnevnys, the Project 7U destroyers had an overall length of 112.5 meters (369 ft 1 in) and a beam of 10.2 meters (33 ft 6 in), but they had a reduced draft of 3.98 meters (13 ft 1 in) at deep load. The ships were slightly overweight, displacing 1,727 metric tons (1,700 long tons) at standard load and 2,279 metric tons (2,243 long tons) at deep load. The crew complement of the Storozhevoy class numbered 207 in peacetime, but this increased to 271 in wartime, as more personnel were needed to operate additional equipment. Each ship had a pair of geared steam turbines, each driving one propeller, rated to produce 54,000 shaft horsepower (40,000 kW) using steam from four water-tube boilers, which the designers expected would exceed the 37-knot (69 km/h; 43 mph) speed of the Project 7s because there was additional steam available. Some fell short of it, although specific figures for most individual ships have not survived. Variations in fuel oil capacity meant that the range of the Project 7Us varied from 1,380 to 2,700 nautical miles (2,560 to 5,000 km; 1,590 to 3,110 mi) at 19 knots (35 km/h; 22 mph).

The ships mounted four 130-millimeter (5.1 in) B-13 guns in two pairs of superfiring single mounts fore and aft of the superstructure. Anti-aircraft defense was provided by a pair of 76.2-millimeter (3 in) 34-K AA guns in single mounts and three 45-millimeter (1.8 in) 21-K AA guns, as well as four 12.7-millimeter (0.50 in) DK or DShK machine guns. They carried six 533 mm (21.0 in) torpedo tubes in two rotating triple mounts amidships. The ships could also carry a maximum of 58 to 96 mines and 30 depth charges. They were fitted with a set of Mars hydrophones for anti-submarine work, although these were useless at speeds over 3 knots (5.6 km/h; 3.5 mph).

== Construction and World War II ==
Serdity was laid down in Shipyard No. 189 (Sergo Ordzhonikidze) in Leningrad with the yard number 298 on 25 October 1936 as a Gnevny-class destroyer with the name of Likhoy. She was relaid down as a Project 7U destroyer on 15 October 1938, and launched on 21 April 1939. The ship was renamed Serdity on 25 September 1940 before acceptance by a state commission on 15 October, although she did not officially join the Baltic Fleet until 12 April 1941, when the Soviet naval jack was raised aboard her.

In the days after the 22 June beginning of Operation Barbarossa, the German invasion of the Soviet Union, Serdity participated in minelaying with her sister ships of the 2nd Division on 24 and 26 June. The destroyer moved north to the Kuivastu roadstead on 27 June due to the German advance, and after the departure of the remainder of the Light Forces Detachment for Tallinn she was left to defend the Gulf of Riga with her sister Silny and the elderly destroyer Engels. The destroyer expended 115 130 mm shells during the 6 July Battle of Irbe Strait against the German minesweeping support ship Minenräumschiff-11 (the former Osnabrück) and her attached minesweepers. (Note: Naval historian Jurgen Rohwer states that the only German participants were Minenräumschiff-11 and the minesweeper M-31.) Due to an inexperienced gunnery officer who was unable to distinguish the fall of Silny's shells from those of his own ship, all of the shells missed.

She participated in an unsuccessful attack on a group of German landing craft off the mouth of the Daugava River on 13 July. Under the flag of Light Forces detachment commander Kontr-admiral Valentin Drozd, she and the destroyer Steregushchy covered minelaying by guard ships Tucha and Sneg on 18 July. By 14:00 of that day she returned to the Kübasaar roadstead near Saaremaa, but quickly turned back after receiving a message that a German convoy had been spotted. Due a lack of coordination with Soviet Naval Aviation, both destroyers came under friendly air attack and at 15:31 a bomb dropped by a Tupolev SB bomber exploded close to Serdity, killing one and wounding three sailors and knocking out a boiler and both rangefinders in the conning tower. Steregushchy, which escaped unscathed, engaged the German convoy escorts, but was only joined by Serdity at 17:24 when they had lost sight of the convoy. After escaping without serious damage from a German bombing raid on the return journey, Serdity anchored in Heltermaa roadstead off Hiiumaa by 19 July.

On that day she came under sudden attack by four Junkers Ju 88 bombers of Kampfgruppe 806 while anchored. Efforts to raise steam proved futile and one of her boilers was destroyed by a bomb that penetrated the deck, knocking out power. A second bomb holed the hull and displaced fuel oil from her tanks, starting a fire that engulfed the forward superstructure and both forward boiler rooms. Although the crew flooded the aft 130 mm magazine, damage control was hindered by the lack of power. The fire spread aft and caused the explosion of ammunition and depth charges, destroying the aft section. Due to the shallow depth of the anchorage, the hull rolled to starboard and remained above the water. The destroyer remained afloat for slightly more than an hour after the air raid, and her survivors were taken off by Steregushchy and the destroyer Gordy. A total of 35 crewmembers were killed and more than 30 were wounded during the sinking. What was left of the hull was destroyed by the explosion of the forward magazines. The destroyer was officially struck from the Soviet Navy on 27 July. Postwar, the wreck was raised in pieces and towed to Tallinn for scrapping between 1949 and 1952.

== Sources ==
- Balakin, Sergey (2007). Легендарные "семёрки" Эсминцы "сталинской" серии [Legendary Sevens: Stalin's Destroyer Series] (in Russian). Moscow: Yauza/Eksmo. ISBN 978-5-699-23784-5.
- Berezhnoy, Sergey (2002). Крейсера и миноносцы. Справочник [Guide to Cruisers and Destroyers] (in Russian). Moscow: Voenizdat. ISBN 5-203-01780-8.
- Hill, Alexander (2018). Soviet Destroyers of World War II. New Vanguard. Vol. 256. Oxford, UK: Osprey Publishing. ISBN 978-1-4728-2256-7.
- Rohwer, Jürgen (2005). Chronology of the War at Sea 1939–1945: The Naval History of World War Two (Third Revised ed.). Annapolis, Maryland: Naval Institute Press. ISBN 1-59114-119-2.
- Rohwer, Jürgen & Monakov, Mikhail S. (2001). Stalin's Ocean-Going Fleet. London: Frank Cass. ISBN 0-7146-4895-7.
- Yakubov, Vladimir & Worth, Richard (2008). "The Soviet Project 7/7U Destroyers". In Jordan, John & Dent, Stephen (eds.). Warship 2008. London: Conway. pp. 99–114. ISBN 978-1-84486-062-3.
