= Soviet destroyer Storozhevoy =

Soviet lead ship of Storozhevoy-class

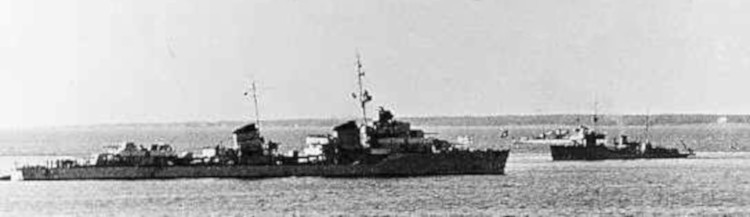
- An unidentified Storozhevoy-class destroyer in the Black Sea

History

Soviet Union
- Name: Storozhevoy (Сторожевой (Protective))
- Ordered: 2nd Five-Year Plan
- Builder: Shipyard No. 190 (Zhdanov), Leningrad
- Yard number: 517
- Laid down: January 1938
- Launched: 2 October 1938
- Completed: 6 October 1940
- Fate: Scrapped, 1958–1959

General characteristics
- Class & type: Storozhevoy-class destroyer
- Displacement: 1,727 t (1,700 long tons) (standard); 2,279 t (2,243 long tons) (full load)
- Length: 112.5 m (369 ft 1 in) (o/a)
- Beam: 10.2 m (33 ft 6 in)
- Draft: 3.98 m (13 ft 1 in)
- Installed power: 4 water-tube boilers; 54,000 shp (40,000 kW) (trials)
- Propulsion: 2 shafts, 2 steam turbine sets
- Speed: 40.3 knots (74.6 km/h; 46.4 mph) (trials)
- Endurance: 2,700 nmi (5,000 km; 3,100 mi) at 19 knots (35 km/h; 22 mph)
- Complement: 207 (271 wartime)
- Sensors & processing systems: Mars hydrophones
- Armament: 4 × single 130 mm (5.1 in) guns; 2 × single 76.2 mm (3 in) AA guns; 3 × single 45 mm (1.8 in) AA guns; 4 × single 12.7 mm (0.50 in) DK or DShK machine guns; 2 × triple 533 mm (21 in) torpedo tubes; 58–96 mines; 30 depth charges

Storozhevoy (Russian: Сторожевой, lit. 'Protective') was the lead ship of her class (officially known as Project 7U) of 18 destroyers built for the Soviet Navy during the late 1930s. Although she began construction as a Project 7 Gnevny-class destroyer, Storozhevoy was completed in 1940 to the modified Project 7U design.

Serving with the Baltic Fleet, her bow was blown off by a German torpedo a few days after the start of the German invasion of the Soviet Union (Operation Barbarossa) in June 1941. Although her crew suffered heavy losses, the aft part of the ship remained afloat and was towed to Soviet naval bases, ultimately being repaired from late 1942 to early 1943 during the Siege of Leningrad by the fitting of a bow from an unfinished Project 30 destroyer. Returning to service in September 1943, Storozhevoy bombarded Axis positions during the final months of the siege. Postwar, she continued to serve in the Baltic and was briefly converted to a training ship before being scrapped in the late 1950s.

== Design ==
Originally built as a Gnevny-class ship, Strashny and her sister ships were completed to the modified Project 7U design after Joseph Stalin, General Secretary of the Communist Party of the Soviet Union, ordered that the later ships be built with their boilers arranged en echelon, instead of linked as in the Gnevnys, so that a ship could still move with one or two boilers disabled.

Like the Gnevnys, the Project 7U destroyers had an overall length of 112.5 meters (369 ft 1 in) and a beam of 10.2 meters (33 ft 6 in), but they had a reduced draft of 3.98 meters (13 ft 1 in) at deep load. The ships were slightly overweight, displacing 1,727 metric tons (1,700 long tons) at standard load and 2,279 metric tons (2,243 long tons) at deep load. The crew complement of the Storozhevoy class numbered 207 in peacetime, increasing to 271 in wartime with more personnel to operate additional equipment. Each ship had a pair of geared steam turbines, each driving one propeller, rated to produce 54,000 shaft horsepower (40,000 kW) using steam from four water-tube boilers, which the designers expected would exceed the 37-knot (69 km/h; 43 mph) speed of the Project 7s because there was additional steam available. Storozhevoy herself reached 40.3 knots (74.6 km/h; 46.4 mph) during her sea trials in 1941. Variations in fuel oil capacity meant that the range of the Project 7Us varied from 1,380 to 2,700 nautical miles (2,560 to 5,000 km; 1,590 to 3,110 mi) at 19 knots (35 km/h; 22 mph), with the upper figure demonstrated by Storozhevoy.

The Project 7U-class ships mounted four 130-millimeter (5.1 in) B-13 guns in two pairs of superfiring single mounts fore and aft of the superstructure. Anti-aircraft defense was provided by a pair of 76.2-millimeter (3 in) 34-K AA guns in single mounts, three 45-millimeter (1.8 in) 21-K AA guns, and four 12.7-millimeter (0.50 in) DK or DShK machine guns. They carried six 533 mm (21.0 in) torpedo tubes in two rotating triple mounts amidships. The ships could also carry a maximum of 58 to 96 mines and 30 depth charges. They were fitted with a set of Mars hydrophones (usable only at speeds below 3 knots (5.6 km/h; 3.5 mph)) for anti-submarine work.

== Construction and career ==
Storozhevoy was laid down in Shipyard No. 190 (Zhdanov) in Leningrad with the yard number 517 on 26 August 1936 as a Gnevny-class destroyer. She was relaid down as the first Project 7U destroyer during January 1938, and launched on 2 October of that year. Although she was officially accepted on 6 October 1940, she did not officially join the Baltic Fleet until 12 April 1941, when the Soviet naval jack was raised aboard her. With the 2nd Destroyer Division of the fleet's Light Forces Detachment, she was transferred from Riga to Ust-Dvinsk, Latvia, on 14 June 1941, a week before the beginning of Operation Barbarossa, the German invasion of the Soviet Union.

During the first days after Operation Barbarossa began, Storozhevoy was tasked with laying defensive minefields, conducting her first such operation on 24 June in the Irbe Strait. To lay additional mines there, she departed Ust-Dvinsk again on the night of 26 June alongside her sisters Stoyky and Serdity as well as the old destroyer Engels. 75 mines were stacked on her deck. After reaching the strait, she was attacked off the Mikhailovsky shoals by five German E-boats of the 3rd Flotilla at 02:27 on 27 June. A torpedo launched by either S-59 or S-31 struck the left side of the ship near the forward magazine; the resulting explosion blew off her bow with its superstructure and the foremast, which sank instantly, while the forward boiler room and front stack were heavily damaged. 84 crewmen and her commander, Kapitan 3-go ranga (Captain 3rd Rank) I.F. Lomakin, were killed. The Soviets did not detect the E-boats, and believed that a submarine had attacked.

The crew managed to keep the aft portion of the destroyer afloat, controlling the flooding and keeping the steam turbines and three boilers operational. At 16:00 it was taken under tow by Engels, which was later relieved by other ships. In several stages, it was towed to Tallinn and thence to Kronstadt, where the incomplete ship was drydocked on 7 July.

=== Repair and modifications ===
During the following months, the heavily damaged parts of the ship were removed and her forward-most remaining bulkhead reinforced. After being transferred to Leningrad on 20 November, further repairs were prevented by the siege of the city and she remained mothballed until August 1942. The ship was hit once each on 23 and 24 April by German artillery, with little effect. On 24 May her aft funnel was hit by a German artillery shell, causing damage to her turbines among other machinery. Transferred to Shipyard No. 190 on 15 July 1942, as a new bow could not be manufactured due to the siege she was fitted with the bow of the unfinished Project 30 destroyer Organizovanny. The new bow included the twin 130 mm BL-2M turret of the Project 30 ships, with a supply of 744 rounds. Her 45 mm anti-aircraft guns were replaced by six newer 37 mm (1.5 in) (70-K) AA guns, while the remainder of her armament remained the same. A British Type 291 search radar was also installed. The new bow increased her overall hull length by a meter and her draft to 4.18 meters (13 ft 9 in). The new bow and additional modifications changed her standard displacement to 1,892 metric tons (1,862 LT) and 2,453 metric tons (2,414 LT) at deep load. During her sea trials in 1944, she reached a maximum speed of 38.9 knots (72.0 km/h; 44.8 mph) and had a range of 1,800 nmi (3,300 km; 2,100 mi) at 17 knots (31 km/h; 20 mph).

=== Post-repair career ===
After the completion of the repairs on 1 May 1943, the destroyer returned to service on 10 September following trials. Her further combat service was limited to shelling Axis positions in support of ground forces during the siege of Leningrad. After the war, all her AA guns were replaced by eight water-cooled V-11M versions of the 70-K gun in twin mounts. From 25 February 1946 to 4 January 1956 she was part of the 4th Fleet after the Baltic Fleet was divided. On 17 February 1956 Storozhevoy was removed from the combat fleet and reclassified as a training destroyer. Her crew was disbanded on 28 January 1958, and on 11 March she was removed from the fleet to be transferred for scrapping, which was carried out by Glavvtorchermet between 1958 and 1959 at Liepāja.

== Sources ==
- Balakin, Sergey (2007). Легендарные "семёрки" Эсминцы "сталинской" серии [Legendary Sevens: Stalin's Destroyer Series] (in Russian). Moscow: Yauza/Eksmo. ISBN 978-5-699-23784-5.
- Berezhnoy, Sergey (2002). Крейсера и миноносцы. Справочник [Guide to Cruisers and Destroyers] (in Russian). Moscow: Voenizdat. ISBN 5-203-01780-8.
- Hill, Alexander (2018). Soviet Destroyers of World War II. New Vanguard. Vol. 256. Oxford, UK: Osprey Publishing. ISBN 978-1-4728-2256-7.
- Platonov, Andrey V. (2002). Энциклопедия советских надводных кораблей 1941–1945 [Encyclopedia of Soviet Surface Ships 1941–1945] (in Russian). Saint Petersburg: Poligon. ISBN 5-89173-178-9.
- Rohwer, Jürgen (2005). Chronology of the War at Sea 1939–1945: The Naval History of World War Two (Third Revised ed.). Annapolis, Maryland: Naval Institute Press. ISBN 1-59114-119-2.
- Rohwer, Jürgen & Monakov, Mikhail S. (2001). Stalin's Ocean-Going Fleet. London: Frank Cass. ISBN 0-7146-4895-7.
- Yakubov, Vladimir & Worth, Richard (2008). "The Soviet Project 7/7U Destroyers". In Jordan, John & Dent, Stephen (eds.). Warship 2008. London: Conway. pp. 99–114. ISBN 978-1-84486-062-3.
