= Soviet destroyer Stroyny (1940) =

Soviet destroyer

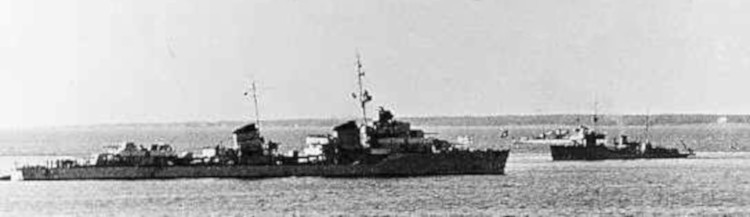
- An unidentified Storozhevoy-class destroyer in the Black Sea

History

Soviet Union
- Name: Stroyny (Orderly (Slim))
- Ordered: 2nd Five-Year Plan
- Builder: Shipyard No. 190 (Zhdanov), Leningrad
- Yard number: 527
- Laid down: 29 December 1938
- Launched: 29 April 1940
- Completed: 15 September 1942
- Commissioned: 30 August 1941
- Renamed: SDK-10, 20 March 1956; SS-17, 27 December 1956; TsL-2, 14 September 1963
- Reclassified: As rescue and decontamination ship, 17 February 1956; As rescue ship, 27 December 1956; As target ship, 14 September 1963
- Stricken: 27 August 1965
- Fate: Scrapped after 27 August 1965

General characteristics (Storozhevoy, 1941)
- Class & type: Storozhevoy-class destroyer
- Displacement: 1,727 t (1,700 long tons) (standard); 2,279 t (2,243 long tons) (full load)
- Length: 112.5 m (369 ft 1 in) (o/a)
- Beam: 10.2 m (33 ft 6 in)
- Draft: 3.98 m (13 ft 1 in)
- Installed power: 4 water-tube boilers; 54,000 shp (40,000 kW) (trials)
- Propulsion: 2 shafts, 2 steam turbine sets
- Speed: 40.3 knots (74.6 km/h; 46.4 mph) (trials)
- Endurance: 2,700 nmi (5,000 km; 3,100 mi) at 19 knots (35 km/h; 22 mph)
- Complement: 207 (271 wartime)
- Sensors & processing systems: Mars hydrophones
- Armament: 4 × single 130 mm (5.1 in) guns; 2 × single 76.2 mm (3 in) AA guns; 3 × single 45 mm (1.8 in) AA guns; 4 × single 12.7 mm (0.50 in) DK or DShK machine guns; 2 × triple 533 mm (21 in) torpedo tubes; 58–96 mines; 30 depth charges

Stroyny (Russian: Стройный, lit. 'Orderly') was one of 18 Storozhevoy-class destroyers (officially known as Project 7U) built for the Soviet Navy during the late 1930s. Although she began construction as a Project 7 Gnevny-class destroyer, Stroyny was completed in 1942 to the modified Project 7U design.

Beginning her sea trials when Operation Barbarossa, the German invasion of the Soviet Union, began in June 1941, the destroyer was placed in service to provide naval gunfire support in September. Stroyny spent the Siege of Leningrad bombarding German positions and was completed in September 1942. Postwar, she officially joined the Baltic Fleet and began a refit in 1953. The latter became a conversion into a rescue ship ultimately designated SS-17 that was completed in 1958. Reduced to a target ship in 1963, she was struck from the Navy List almost two years later, then scrapped.

== Design and description ==
Originally built as a Gnevny-class ship, Stroyny and her sister ships were completed to the modified Project 7U design after Joseph Stalin, General Secretary of the Communist Party of the Soviet Union, ordered that the latter be built with their boilers arranged en echelon, instead of linked as in the Gnevnys, so that a ship could still move with one or two boilers disabled.

Like the Gnevnys, the Project 7U destroyers had an overall length of 112.5 meters (369 ft 1 in) and a beam of 10.2 meters (33 ft 6 in), but they had a reduced draft of 3.98 meters (13 ft 1 in) at deep load. The ships were slightly overweight, displacing 1,727 metric tons (1,700 long tons) at standard load and 2,279 metric tons (2,243 long tons) at deep load. The crew complement of the Storozhevoy class numbered 207 in peacetime, but this increased to 271 in wartime, as more personnel were needed to operate additional equipment. Each ship had a pair of geared steam turbines, each driving one propeller, rated to produce 54,000 shaft horsepower (40,000 kW) using steam from four water-tube boilers, which the designers expected would exceed the 37-knot (69 km/h; 43 mph) speed of the Project 7s because there was additional steam available. Some fell short of it, although specific figures for most individual ships have not survived. Variations in fuel oil capacity meant that the range of the Project 7Us varied from 1,380 to 2,700 nautical miles (2,560 to 5,000 km; 1,590 to 3,110 mi) at 19 knots (35 km/h; 22 mph), that upper figure demonstrated by Storozhevoy.

The Project 7U-class ships mounted four 130-millimeter (5.1 in) B-13 guns in two pairs of superfiring single mounts fore and aft of the superstructure. Anti-aircraft defense was provided by a pair of 76.2-millimeter (3 in) 34-K AA guns in single mounts and three 45-millimeter (1.8 in) 21-K AA guns, as well as four 12.7-millimeter (0.50 in) DK or DShK machine guns. They carried six 533 mm (21.0 in) torpedo tubes in two rotating triple mounts amidships. The ships could also carry a maximum of 58 to 96 mines and 30 depth charges. They were fitted with a set of Mars hydrophones for anti-submarine work, although these were useless at speeds over 3 knots (5.6 km/h; 3.5 mph).

=== Modifications ===
Before the end of the war, the ship had exchanged both of her 21-K mounts for six 37-millimeter (1.5 in) 70-K AA guns in single mounts and an additional 34-K mount. By the end of the war, she had received a British ASDIC system and a radar of unknown type. After the war, all of her AA guns were replaced by eight water-cooled V-11M versions of the 70-K gun in twin mounts.

Due to the threat of nuclear attack in the early 1950s, Stroyny and several of her sisters were rebuilt as Project 32 rescue and decontamination ships due to their obsolescence as the Soviet Naval command considered it necessary to have ships capable of rendering assistance to ships attacked by nuclear or other weapons of mass destruction. In event of war, the rebuilt ships were to conduct nuclear, biological, and chemical reconnaissance in areas that such weapons were used, tow damaged ships as large as light cruisers out of the contaminated zone, assist ship crews in pumping and firefighting and treating wounded, and carry out decontamination of ship interiors. They were also capable of assisting the crews of sunken submarines.

To create space for the additional equipment, the torpedo tubes were removed and the original gun armament replaced by two double 57-millimeter (2.2 in) ZiF-31BS guns. The bridge was widened and a windshield installed, and the mast converted into a tripod mounting antennas for the Lin-M guidance radar, Stvor navigational radar, and Nikhrom identification friend or foe system. Special equipment included a dosimetry unit, chemical control station, automatic toxic substances signaling device, foam extinguishing system, water protection system for flushing substances overboard, and two decontamination stations. Two pumps were installed in the former magazines and winches, cable hangers, compressed air cylinders, and decompression chambers were fitted on the deck and superstructure.

== Construction and service ==
Stroyny was laid down at Shipyard No. 190 (Zhdanov) in Leningrad with the yard number 527 on 26 October 1936 as a Gnevny-class destroyer. She was relaid down as a Project 7U destroyer on 29 December 1938, and launched on 29 April 1940. By the 22 June 1941 beginning of Operation Barbarossa, the German invasion of the Soviet Union, she was near completion, preparing for mooring trials. The workload of the shipyard and the Siege of Leningrad prevented a quick completion, although on 30 August the Soviet naval jack was raised aboard her and on 20 September she was conditionally accepted by the navy.

During September she moved under her own power with one operational boiler to the Ust-Izhora Shipyard, from which the destroyer shelled German troops. During the year Stroyny her 130 mm guns fired 2,387 rounds in support of Soviet troops. After her completion on 22 September 1942, wartime conditions prevented sea trials. For the rest of the war Stroyny remained on the Neva, providing fire support to ground troops and counter-battery fire. She expended 1,106 and 1,488 main-gun shells in 1942 and 1943, respectively. In three days of bombardment during the Krasnoye Selo–Ropsha Offensive between 14 and 16 January 1944, the destroyer fired four hundred and forty-three 130 mm shells. A total of 5,424 shells from her 130 mm guns were expended during the siege; the wear from the large number of shells required changing of the barrel liners twice.

After the war, between August and October 1945, Stroyny completed sea trials before officially joining the Baltic Fleet on 11 December. Transferred to the 4th Fleet between 25 February 1946 and 4 January 1956 when the Baltic Fleet was split, Stroyny was modernized at Yantar Shipyard in Kaliningrad from 30 November 1953; this became a conversion to a Project 32 rescue and decontamination ship on 17 February 1956. During this period she was renamed SDK-10 on 20 March 1956 and SS-17 on 27 December of that year, the latter after the Soviet Navy decided to classify her as a regular rescue ship. After several years in this auxiliary role from completion of the conversion in 1958, she was converted into a target ship designated TsL-2 on 14 September 1963. The former destroyer was struck from the Navy List on 27 August 1965 before its crew disbanded on 12 September; the ship was scrapped at Liepāja between 1965 and 1966.

== Sources ==
- Balakin, Sergey (2007). Легендарные "семёрки" Эсминцы "сталинской" серии [Legendary Sevens: Stalin's Destroyer Series] (in Russian). Moscow: Yauza/Eksmo. ISBN 978-5-699-23784-5.
- Berezhnoy, Sergey (2002). Крейсера и миноносцы. Справочник [Guide to Cruisers and Destroyers] (in Russian). Moscow: Voenizdat. ISBN 5-203-01780-8.
- Hill, Alexander (2018). Soviet Destroyers of World War II. New Vanguard. Vol. 256. Oxford, UK: Osprey Publishing. ISBN 978-1-4728-2256-7.
- Rohwer, Jürgen (2005). Chronology of the War at Sea 1939–1945: The Naval History of World War Two (Third Revised ed.). Annapolis, Maryland: Naval Institute Press. ISBN 1-59114-119-2.
- Rohwer, Jürgen & Monakov, Mikhail S. (2001). Stalin's Ocean-Going Fleet. London: Frank Cass. ISBN 0-7146-4895-7.
- Yakubov, Vladimir & Worth, Richard (2008). "The Soviet Project 7/7U Destroyers". In Jordan, John & Dent, Stephen (eds.). Warship 2008. London: Conway. pp. 99–114. ISBN 978-1-84486-062-3.
