= Russian destroyer Desna =

1915 destroyers for the Imperial Russian Navy

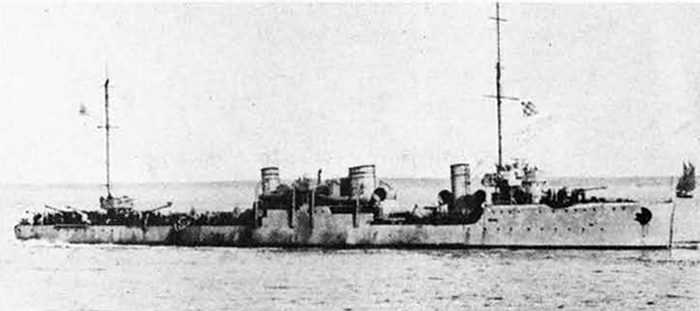

History

Russian Empire
- Name: Desna
- Builder: Metal Works, Petrograd
- Laid down: 15 June 1915
- Launched: 22 October 1915
- Completed: 12 August 1916
- Fate: Joined the Bolsheviks, October 1917

Soviet Union
- Acquired: October 1917
- In service: 21 April 1921
- Renamed: Engels, 31 December 1922
- Fate: Sunk by naval mine, 24 August 1941

General characteristics (as built)
- Class & type: Orfey-class destroyer
- Displacement: 1,260 t (1,240 long tons)
- Length: 98 m (321 ft 6 in)
- Beam: 9.3 m (30 ft 6 in)
- Draught: 2.98 m (9 ft 9 in)
- Installed power: 4 Normand boilers; 32,000 PS (24,000 kW)
- Propulsion: 2 shafts, 2 steam turbines
- Speed: 31 knots (57 km/h; 36 mph)
- Range: 1,680 nmi (3,110 km; 1,930 mi) at 21 knots (39 km/h; 24 mph)
- Complement: 150
- Armament: 4 × single 102 mm (4 in) guns; 3 × triple 450 mm (17.7 in) torpedo tubes; 80 × naval mines

Desna (Десна) was one of eight Orfey-class destroyers built for the Imperial Russian Navy during World War I. Completed in 1916, she served with the Baltic Fleet and played a minor role in the Battle of Kassar Wiek during the defense of the West Estonian Archipelago in October 1917 when the Germans invaded them (Operation Albion). Her crew joined the Bolshevik Red Fleet during the October Revolution.

The destroyer was renamed Engels (Энгельс) in 1922. She played a minor role during the Winter War of 1939–1940. When the Axis powers invaded the Soviet Union in June 1941 (Operation Barbarossa), the ship participated in the early stages of the Gulf of Riga campaign. Bomb damage forced Engels to withdraw to Tallinn, Estonia, in August for repairs and she was tasked to escort an evacuation convoy from Tallinn to Kronstadt later that month. The ship ran into a minefield en route and sank after hitting mines on 24 August.

== Design and description ==
The Orfey-class ships were designed as an improved version of the Derzky class. Desna normally displaced 1,260 metric tons (1,240 long tons) and 1,568 t (1,543 long tons) at full load. She measured 98 meters (321 ft 6 in) long overall with a beam of 9.3 meters (30 ft 6 in), and a draft of 2.98 meters (9 ft 9 in). The Orfeys were propelled by two steam turbines, each driving one propeller using steam from four Normand boilers. The turbines were designed to produce a total of 32,000 metric horsepower (24,000 kW) for an intended maximum speed of 35 knots (65 km/h; 40 mph) using forced draft. On Desna's sea trials, she only reached 31.1 knots (57.6 km/h; 35.8 mph). The Orfeys carried enough fuel oil to give them a range of 1,680 nautical miles (3,110 km; 1,930 mi) at 21 knots (39 km/h; 24 mph). Their crew numbered 150.

The Orfey-class ships were originally intended to have an armament of two single 102-millimeter (four-inch) Pattern 1911 Obukhov guns and a dozen 450-millimeter (17.7 in) torpedo tubes in six double mounts. The Naval General Staff changed this to four triple mounts once they became available and then decided to exchange a torpedo mount for two more four-inch guns in August 1915 while the ships were still under construction. One of these guns was mounted on the forecastle and three on the stern, aft of the torpedo tubes. Desna was completed without an anti-aircraft gun, but was equipped with a pair of 7.62-millimeter (0.3 in) Maxim machine guns on single mounts. The Orfeys were completed with one triple torpedo mount between the forward funnels and two mounts aft of the rear funnel and could carry 80 M1912 naval mines or 50 larger ones. They were also fitted with a 2.7-meter (9 ft) Barr and Stroud rangefinder and two 60-centimeter (24 in) searchlights.

== Construction and career ==
Desna was laid down at the Metal Works in Petrograd in November 1914, launched on 25 October 1915 and completed on 16 August 1916. Assigned to the Baltic Fleet, she made six sorties into the Baltic Sea that year in unsuccessful attempts to interdict the German supply of high-quality Swedish iron ore either by combat or the laying of minefields. These operations were carried out before the Gulf of Finland was iced over late in the year. On one of these missions, the ship was part of a force of five destroyers that laid 200 mines off the coast of Steinort, Germany (modern Gleźnowo, Poland), on the night of 18/19 October. The merchantman SS General Kutuzov that the Germans had salvaged in Ventspils, Latvia, was sunk by one of those mines a few days later. The minesweeper T 64 sank while clearing the minefield.

=== Battle of Kassar Wiek ===
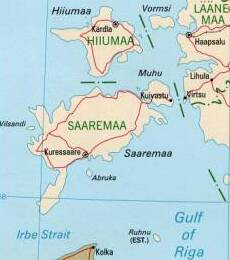
Kassar Wiek is the western area of Moon Sound, between Muhu, Saaremaa, and Hiiumaa Islands

Following the capture of Riga, Governorate of Livonia, in September, the Germans began planning amphibious landings on the islands of the West Estonian Archipelago, codenamed Operation Albion. Their objective was to deny Moon Sound to the Imperial Russian Navy and to capture the islands of Muhu and Saaremaa so that it no longer had bases from which to threaten the supply lines through the Gulf of Riga. The main thrust of the operation was to consist of landings on the northwestern coast of Saaremaa, with follow-on objectives to capture the coast-defense artillery positions that blocked German access into the Gulf of Riga and to seize Muhu before the Russians could reinforce the troops there. Kassar Wiek is the shallow western portion of Moon Sound, between the islands of Saarema, Muhu, and Hiiumaa, that lies north of the Gulf of Riga. Soela Strait separates Saaremaa and Hiiuma. The Germans initiated their attack with landings on the northwestern coast of Saaremaa during the morning of 12 October.

By October, Desna had been assigned to the 2nd Destroyer Division of the Naval Forces of the Gulf of Riga. On the afternoon of 12 October a German force of six destroyers and six torpedo boats passed through the Soela Strait into Kassar Wiek. Their objective was to push the torpedo boats forward so they could support the troops attacking the Russian fortifications defending the causeway between Saaremaa and Muhu. The gunboat Grozyashchy and the destroyers General Kondratenko and Pogranichnik were on patrol there. Grozyashchy advanced, unsupported by the destroyers, and began shooting at the German ships at a range of 13,000 m (14,000 yd). By her fourth salvo, her gunners' accurate fire had forced them to lay a smoke screen and to zigzag. The gunboat was ordered to fall back upon the destroyers after the German ships had advanced through the smoke screen, although she continued to use her stern guns. Grozyashchy was hit three times before Desna and the destroyer Razyashchy arrived. The former fired 57 four-inch shells before the Germans disengaged.

Desna played no role in the fighting on 13 and 14 October, and only a minor role in the inconclusive engagement on 15 October as she was deployed as a reinforcement in the afternoon. The following day, the ship also did not participate in the battle in Kassar Wiek or in the Battle of Moon Sound on 17 October.

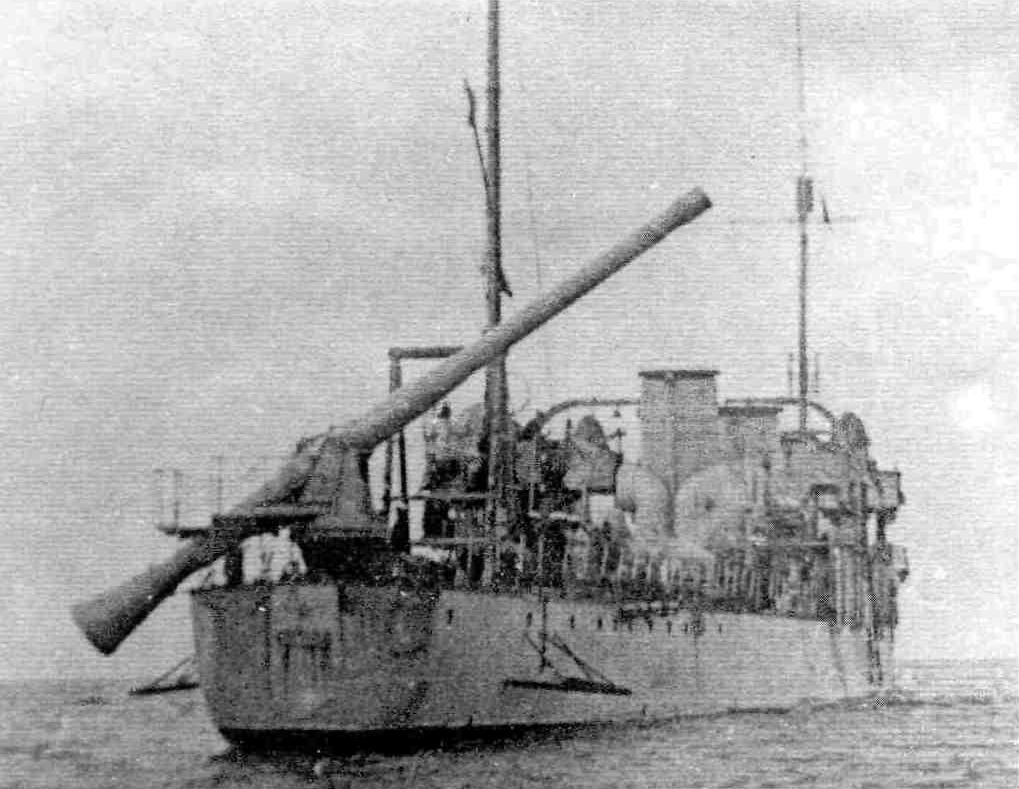
Leonid Kurchevsky's recoilless rifle on the ship's stern

The ship's crew went over to the Bolsheviks during the October Revolution. She was icebound in Helsinki harbor when the Germans decided to intervene in the Finnish Civil War in April 1918. Their troops soon threatened Helsinki and the Baltic Fleet was ordered to evacuate the port. Desna was part of the last echelon to depart before the Germans gained control of the city and had to be towed to Kronstadt from 10 to 16 April 1918 in the Ice Cruise of the Baltic Fleet. She was placed in reserve in the following October until she was reactivated in December 1919. The ship received a lengthy refit during 1922–1924 that included enclosing the bridge, and was renamed Engels on 31 December 1922. She was refitted again in 1932. During this refit a 45-millimeter (1.8 in) 21-K AA gun was installed as were three reload torpedoes. The ship was equipped with ten 165-kilogram (364 lb) B-1 and fifteen 41-kilogram (90 lb) M-1 depth charges sometime in 1933. In September 1934, Engels served as the test ship for a 305-millimeter (12 in) recoilless rifle designed by Leonid Kurchevsky.

=== World War II ===
She unsuccessfully searched for Polish submarines in the Gulf of Finland from 19 to 21 September 1939. After the Winter War began on 30 November, the ship bombarded Finnish coastal-defense positions on and near Saarenpää Island, part of the Beryozovye Islands, in conjunction with other ships, on 9–10 and 18–19 December. Engels ran aground on Gogland Island on 16 January 1940, severely damaging her hull. She was refloated four days later and towed to Tallinn for repairs. The ship became the flotilla leader of the 1st Submarine Brigade in 1940.

The Great Patriotic War began on 22 June 1941 when the Axis Powers invaded the Soviet Union, Engels was transferred to the 3rd Destroyer Division. The ship helped to lay minefields in the Irben Strait on 26 June; she towed the destroyer Storozhevoy to Kuressaare, Saaremaa, after that ship had her bow blown off by a torpedo from a German S-boat. Engels assisted in laying more minefields in the Irben Strait on 3 and 6 July. The ship participated in the Gulf of Riga campaign in July. An attack by Engels and seven other destroyers on a German convoy advancing on Riga failed on 12–13 July. A bomb hit on 7 August knocked out one turbine and punctured her hull, forcing her to withdraw to Tallinn for repairs. While escorting an evacuation convoy from that city to Kronstadt and only partially repaired, she struck two mines and sank on 24 August; most of her crew was rescued.

== Bibliography ==
- Apalkov, Yu. V. (1996). Боевые корабли русского флота: 8.1914-10.1917г [Combat Ships of the Russian Fleet: 8.1914-10.1917] (in Russian). ИНТЕК. ISBN 5-7559-0018-3.
- Berezhnoy, S. S. (2002). Крейсера и Миносцы: Справочик [Cruisers and Destroyers: Reference] (in Russian). Ввоенное Ииздательство. ISBN 5-203-01780-8.
- Budzbon, Przemysław (1985). "Russia". In Gray, Randal (ed.). Conway's All the World's Fighting Ships 1906–1921. Naval Institute Press. pp. 291–325. ISBN 0-85177-245-5.
- Budzbon, Przemysław; Radziemski, Jan & Twardowski, Marek (2022). Warships of the Soviet Fleets 1939–1945. Vol. I: Major Combatants. Naval Institute Press. ISBN 978-1-68247-877-6.
- Greger, René (1972). The Russian Fleet, 1914-1917. Ian Allan. ISBN 0-7110-0255-X.
- O'Hara, Vincent (2017). Clash of Fleets: Naval Battles of the Great War, 1914-18. Naval Institute Press. ISBN 978-1-68247-008-4.
- Platonov, Andrey V. (2002). Энциклопедия советских надводных кораблей 1941–1945 [Encyclopedia of Soviet Surface Ships 1941–1945] (in Russian). Poligon. ISBN 5-89173-178-9.
- Rohwer, Jürgen (2005). Chronology of the War at Sea 1939–1945: The Naval History of World War Two (Third Revised ed.). Naval Institute Press. ISBN 1-59114-119-2.
- Staff, Gary (2009). Battle for the Baltic Islands 1917: Triumph of the Imperial German Navy. Pen and Sword Maritime. ISBN 978-1-84415-787-7.
- Verstyuk, Anatoly & Gordeyev, Stanislav (2006). Корабли Минных дивизий. От "Новика" до "Гогланда" [Torpedo Division Ships: From Novik to Gogland] (in Russian). Voennaya Kniga. ISBN 5-902863-10-4.
