= Storozhevoy-class destroyer =

Soviet destroyers built 1936–1942

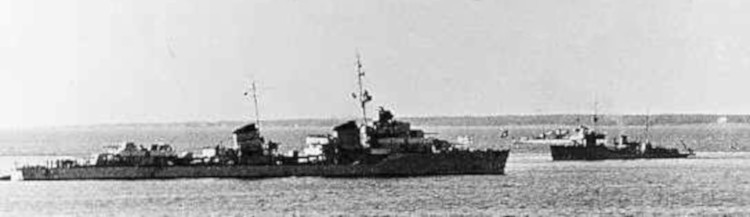
- An unidentified Storozhevoy-class destroyer in the Black Sea

Class overview
- Name: Storozhevoy class
- Operators: Soviet Navy
- Preceded by: Gnevny class
- Succeeded by: Ognevoy class
- Built: 1936–1942
- In service: 1940–1963
- Completed: 18
- Lost: 9
- Retired: 9

General characteristics (Storozhevoy as completed, 1941)
- Type: Destroyer
- Displacement: 1,727 t (1,700 long tons) (standard); 2,279 t (2,243 long tons) (full load)
- Length: 112.5 m (369 ft 1 in) (o/a)
- Beam: 10.2 m (33 ft 6 in)
- Draft: 3.98 m (13 ft 1 in)
- Installed power: 4 water-tube boilers; 60,000 shp (44,740 kW) (trials)
- Propulsion: 2 shafts, 2 steam turbine sets
- Speed: 40.3 knots (74.6 km/h; 46.4 mph) (trials)
- Endurance: 2,700 nmi (5,000 km; 3,100 mi) at 19 knots (35 km/h; 22 mph)
- Complement: 207 (271 wartime)
- Sensors & processing systems: Mars hydrophones
- Armament: 4 × single 130 mm (5.1 in) guns; 2 × single 76.2 mm (3 in) AA guns; 3 × single 45 mm (1.8 in) AA guns; 4 × single 12.7 mm (0.50 in) DK or DShK machine guns; 2 × triple 533 mm (21 in) torpedo tubes; 58–96 mines; 30 depth charges

The Storozhevoy class were a group of 18 destroyers built for the Soviet Navy in the late 1930s that were officially known as Project 7U (Uluchshennyy (Improved)). The design was finalised in 1936 after initial disappointments with the Gnevny class. The main changes were unit machinery (four boilers instead of three), a strengthened hull and reduced fuel capacity. The anti-aircraft guns were repositioned to improve firing arcs. The ships fought in World War II.

== Background and description ==
Naval historians Yakubov and Worth state that the change to unit machinery was due to an incident when the British destroyer HMS Hunter was stopped due to machinery damage by a mine during neutrality patrols in the Spanish Civil War. The incident was reported at a meeting where Joseph Stalin was present and he ordered that the ships be redesigned with unit machinery so that a ship could still move if one of the two boiler or engine rooms were incapacitated. This change in design saved Slavny following mine damage in 1941, but led to a considerable delay in the Soviet destroyer program and the cancellation of six Type 7 ships. Fitting the additional machinery in the same hull presented significant challenges, leading to an increase in weight, cramped accommodation and a reduction in fuel capacity. These changes led Soviet sailors to nickname the Type 7U, 7 Ukhudshennyi (ухудшенный, made worse).

The Storozhevoys had an overall length of 112.5 meters (369 ft 1 in), a beam of 10.2 meters (33 ft 6 in), and a draft of 3.98 meters (13 ft 1 in) at deep load. The ships were slightly overweight, displacing 1,727 metric tons (1,700 long tons) at standard load and 2,279 metric tons (2,243 long tons) at deep load. Their crew numbered 207 officers and sailors in peacetime and 271 in wartime.

The ships were powered by two geared steam turbine sets, each driving a single three-bladed 2.9-meter (9 ft 6 in) propeller using steam provided by four water-tube boilers that operated at a pressure of 26.5 kg/cm^{2} (2,599 kPa; 377 psi) and a temperature of 350 °C (662 °F). The turbines, rated at 54,000 shp (40,000 kW), were intended to give the ships a speed of 38 knots (70 km/h; 44 mph). The designers had been conservative in rating the turbines and many, but not all, of the ships handily exceeded their designed speed during their sea trials. Storozhevoy reached 40.3 knots (74.6 km/h; 46.4 mph) during her trials in 1941, but Soobrazitelny only managed 36.8 knots (68.2 km/h; 42.3 mph). Variations in fuel oil capacity meant that the range of the Storozhevoys varied between 1,380 and 2,700 nautical miles (2,560 and 5,000 km; 1,590 and 3,110 mi) at 19 knots (35 km/h; 22 mph).

=== Armament and fire control ===
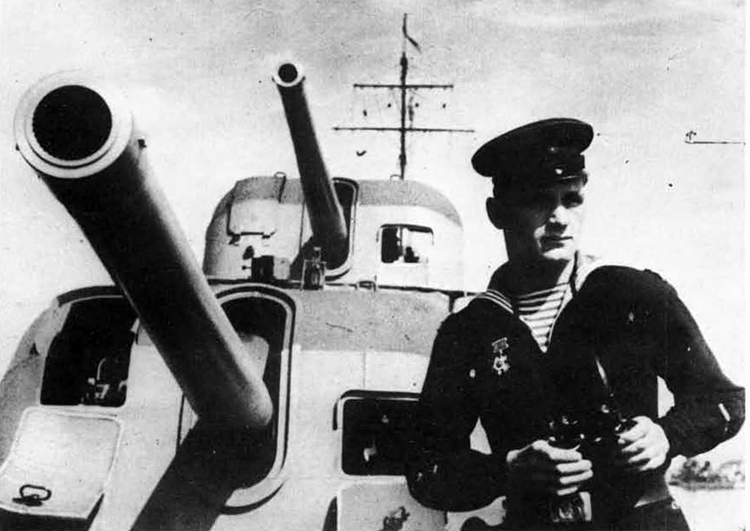
Soobrazitelny's forward guns

As built, the Storozhevoy-class ships mounted four 50-caliber 130-millimeter (5.1 in) B-13 guns in two pairs of superfiring single mounts fore and aft of the superstructure. Each gun was provided with 150 rounds. The development of the gun was troubled by excessive barrel erosion problems and three variants were built in a not entirely successful effort to resolve the problem which complicated logistical and operational support as each performed slightly differently. The manually operated mounts had an elevation range between -5° and +45° and had a rate of fire of 6–10 rounds per minute. They fired a 33.4-kilogram (74 lb) shell at a muzzle velocity of 870 m/s (2,900 ft/s), which gave them a range of 25,597 meters (27,993 yd).

Anti-aircraft defense was provided by two 55-caliber 76.2-millimeter (3 in) 34-K AA guns and three 46-caliber 45-millimeter (1.8 in) 21-K AA guns, all in single mounts as well as four 12.7-millimeter (0.50 in) DK or DShK machine guns. The 34-K guns could elevate between -5° and +85°, had a rate of fire of 15–20 rounds per minute, and the ships carried 300 rounds per gun for them. Their muzzle velocity of 801 meters per second (2,630 ft/s) gave their 26-pound (11.9 kg) high-explosive shells a maximum horizontal range of 14,640 meters (16,010 yd) and an effective ceiling of 6,500 meters (21,300 ft). The 21-K was a converted anti-tank gun with a rate of fire of 25–30 rounds per minute with an elevation range between -10° and +85°. The gun fired a 1.41-kilogram (3.1 lb) shell at a muzzle velocity of 760 ft/s (230 m/s). This gave them a range of 9,200 meters (10,100 yd). The Project 7Us stowed 500 rounds for each gun. The DShK had an effective rate of fire of 125 rounds per minute and an effective range against aircraft of 2,500 meters (2,700 yd).

The ships were equipped with six 533 mm (21.0 in) torpedo tubes in two rotating triple mounts amidships; each tube was provided with a reload. The Project 7U-class ships primarily used the 53-38 or the 53-38U torpedo, which differed only in the size of their warhead; the latter had a warhead 100 kilograms (220 lb) heavier than the 300-kilogram (660 lb) warhead of the 53–38. The torpedoes had three range/speed settings: 10,000 meters (11,000 yd) at 30.5 knots (56.5 km/h; 35.1 mph); 8,000 meters (8,700 yd) at 34.5 knots (63.9 km/h; 39.7 mph) and 4,000 meters (4,400 yd) at 44.5 knots (82.4 km/h; 51.2 mph). The ships could also carry a maximum of either 60 or 96 mines and 25 depth charges. They were fitted with a set of Mars hydrophones for anti-submarine work, although it was useless at speeds over 3 knots (5.6 km/h; 3.5 mph).

Fire control for the main battery of the Storozhevoys was provided by a Mina-7 fire-control system that was derived from an Italian Galileo system. It included a TsAS-2 mechanical analog computer that received information from a KDP2-4 gunnery director on the roof of the bridge which mounted a pair of DM-4 four-meter (13 ft 1 in) stereoscopic rangefinders. Anti-aircraft fire control was strictly manual with only a DM-3 three-meter (9 ft 10 in) rangefinder to provide data to the guns. Some ships received the Soyuz high-angle fire-control system for the 34-K guns. It consisted of a mechanical analog computer, a Gazon vertical gyroscope and an SVP-29 stabilized viewfinder. The system could handle targets like bombers flying level, but was useless against aircraft attacking in a dive.

=== Modifications ===
Later in the war electronic equipment such as radar and sonar were supplied by the Allies for these ships.

== Ships ==
All of the ships of the class were originally begun as Type 7 destroyers and their partially completed hulls were broken up and relaid down as Type 7Us. Those ships shown with two shipyards were begun at the first and were then towed to the second one for completion.

Ship	Builder	Laid down	Launched	Commissioned	Fate
Baltic Fleet
Storozhevoy (Сторожевой (Protective))	Shipyard No. 190 (Zhdanov), Leningrad	26 August 1936; 31 January 1938	2 October 1938	6 October 1940	Scrapped, 1958–1959
Silny (Сильный (Strong))	Shipyard No. 190 (Zhdanov), Leningrad	26 October 1936; 31 January 1938	1 November 1938	31 October 1940	Scrapped, 21 January 1960
Serdity (Сердитый (Enraged))	Shipyard No. 190 (Zhdanov), Leningrad	25 October 1936; 15 October 1938	21 April 1939	15 October 1940	Sunk, 19 July 1941
Slavny (Славный (Glorious))	Shipyard No. 189 (Ordzhonikidze), Leningrad	31 August 1936; 31 January 1939	19 August 1939	31 May 1941	Scrapped, 1964
Smely (Смелый (Valiant))	Shipyard No. 189 (Ordzhonikidze), Leningrad	26 October 1936; 31 March 1938	30 April 1939	31 May 1941	Scuttled, 27 July 1941
Stoyky (Стойкий (Steadfast))	Shipyard No. 189 (Ordzhonikidze), Leningrad	26 August 1936; 31 March 1938	26 December 1938	18 October 1940	Sank in a storm, 2 July 1960
Strashny (Страшный (Frightening))	Shipyard No. 190 (Zhdanov), Leningrad	26 August 1936; 31 March 1938	8 April 1939	22 June 1941	Scrapped, 12 January 1960
Surovy (Суровый (Severe))	Shipyard No. 190 (Zhdanov), Leningrad	27 October 1936; 1 February 1939	5 August 1939	31 May 1941	Scuttled, 13 November 1941
Skory (Скорый (Rapid))	Shipyard No. 190 (Zhdanov), Leningrad	29 November 1936; 23 October 1938	24 July 1939	18 July 1941	Sunk by naval mine, 28 August 1941
Statny (Статный (Stately))	Shipyard No. 190 (Zhdanov), Leningrad	29 November 1936; 29 December 1938	24 November 1939	9 July 1941	Sank in a storm, 23 August 1941
Strogy (Строгий (Strict))	Shipyard No. 190 (Zhdanov), Leningrad	26 October 1936; 26 October 1938	31 December 1939	22 September 1941	Scrapped, 26 June 1964
Stroyny (Стройный (Slim))	Shipyard No. 190 (Zhdanov), Leningrad	26 August 1936; 29 December 1938	29 April 1939	22 September 1941	Scrapped, 1965–1966
Svirepy (Свирепый (Fierce))	Shipyard No. 190 (Zhdanov), Leningrad	29 November 1936; 30 December 1938	28 August 1939	22 June 1941	Scrapped, 28 January 1958
Black Sea Fleet	Shipyard No. 190 (Zhdanov), Leningrad				
Smyshlyony (Смышлёный (Clever))	Shipyard No. 200 (61 Communards), Nikolayev	15 October 1936; 27 June 1938	26 August 1939	10 November 1940	Sunk by mines, 8 March 1942
Soobrazitelny (Сообразительный (Shrewd))	Shipyard No. 200 (61 Communards), Nikolayev	15 October 1936; 3 March 1939	26 August 1939	7 June 1941	Scrapped, 1966
Sposobny (Способный (Capable))	Shipyard No. 200 (61 Communards), Nikolayev	7 July 1936; 7 March 1939	30 September 1939	24 June 1941	Sunk by aircraft, 6 October 1943
Sovershenny (Совершенный (Absolute))	Shipyard No. 200 (61 Communards), Nikolayev; Shipyard No. 201 (Ordzhonikidze), Sevastopol	17 September 1936; 1938	25 February 1939	30 September 1941	Sunk by aircraft, 8 June 1942
Svobodny (Свободный (Free))	Shipyard No. 200 (61 Communards), Nikolayev; Shipyard No. 201 (Ordzhonikidze), Sevastopol	23 August 1936; 1938	25 February 1939	2 January 1942	Sunk by aircraft, 10 June 1942

== Service history ==
=== Black Sea Fleet ===
The first two Project 7U destroyers completed by the Black Sea shipyards, Smyshlyony and Soobrazitelny, joined the 3rd Destroyer Division, led by destroyer leaders Kharkov and Moskva, of the fleet Light Forces Detachment upon their entry into service at Sevastopol in late 1940 and early 1941. After the 22 June 1941 start of Operation Barbarossa, the German invasion of the Soviet Union, Smyshlyony and Soobrazitelny were tasked to support Kharkov and Moskva in the 26 June Raid on Constanța together with the cruiser Voroshilov. A grounded paravane on Smyshlyony prevented her from rendezvousing on schedule, while Soobrazitelny became separated from the cruiser in the dark. Both destroyers helped escort the damaged Kharkov back to base. Sposobny and Svobodny joined the 3rd Division when they entered service during the war. All three destroyers in service were on escort duty in July and from late August they escorted transports and provided fire support to the defenders of besieged Odessa. Sovershenny never joined the fleet as she was heavily damaged by a Soviet mine during trials. Soobrazitelny was the only one of the five Project 7Us completed for the Black Sea Fleet to survive the war.
