= List of lakes of Latvia =

The following is a list of biggest lakes of Latvia.

== Lakes by area ==
| Name | Area | Length |
|---|---|---|
| Lubāns | 80.70 km^{2} (31.16 sq mi) | 15.6 km (9.7 mi) |
| Rāznas ezers | 57.56 km^{2} (22.22 sq mi) | 12.1 km (7.5 mi) |
| Engures ezers | 40.46 km^{2} (15.62 sq mi) | 17.9 km (11.1 mi) |
| Burtnieks | 40.07 km^{2} (15.47 sq mi) | 13.3 km (8.3 mi) |
| Liepājas ezers | 37.15 km^{2} (14.34 sq mi) | 16.2 km (10.1 mi) |
| Usmas ezers | 34.69 km^{2} (13.39 sq mi) | 13.5 km (8.4 mi) |
| Babītes ezers | 25.56 km^{2} (9.87 sq mi) | 14 km (8.7 mi) |
| Rušons | 23.73 km^{2} (9.16 sq mi) | 13 km (8.1 mi) |
| Sivers | 17.59 km^{2} (6.79 sq mi) | 8.1 km (5.0 mi) |
| Ķīšezers | 17.30 km^{2} (6.68 sq mi) | 8.4 km (5.2 mi) |
| Alūksnes ezers | 15.43 km^{2} (5.96 sq mi) | 6.6 km (4.1 mi) |
| Riču ezers | 12.83 km^{2} (4.95 sq mi) (Note: The area of the lake in the territory of Latvia is 5.88 km^{2} (2.27 sq mi).) | 5.8 km (3.6 mi) |
| Cirma ezers | 12.61 km^{2} (4.87 sq mi) | |
| Papes ezers | 12.05 km^{2} (4.65 sq mi) | 8.3 km (5.2 mi) |
| Kaņieris | 11.28 km^{2} (4.36 sq mi) | 5.2 km (3.2 mi) |
| Ežezers | 9.88 km^{2} (3.81 sq mi) | 8.2 km (5.1 mi) |
| Lielais Ludzas ezers | 8.46 km^{2} (3.27 sq mi) | 7.0 km (4.3 mi) |
| Alauksts | 7.75 km^{2} (2.99 sq mi) | 4.8 km (3.0 mi) |
| Saukas ezers | 7.71 km^{2} (2.98 sq mi) | 6.2 km (3.9 mi) |
| Drīdzis | 7.53 km^{2} (2.91 sq mi) | 9.8 km (6.1 mi) |

== Lakes by depth ==
| Name | Depth |
|---|---|
| Drīdzis | 66.2 m (217 ft) |
| Garais ezers | 56.0 m (183.7 ft) |
| Lielais Gusena ezers | 56.0 m (183.7 ft) |
| Riču ezers | 51.9 m (170 ft) |
| Pļaviņu ūdenskrātuve | 47.0 m (154.2 ft) |
| Geraņimovas Ilzas ezers | 46.0 m (150.9 ft) |
| Ormijs | 43.0 m (141.1 ft) |
| Ojatu ezers | 40.5 m (133 ft) |
| Ušurs | 40.0 m (131.2 ft) |
| Sventes ezers | 38.0 m (124.7 ft) |
