= Mērsrags Port =

Port in Latvia

- Click on the map for a fullscreen view

Location
- Country: Latvia
- Coordinates: 57°19′54″N 23°07′57″E

Statistics
- Website mersragsport.lv

Mērsrags Port (Latvian: Mersraga osta) is the port authority of Mērsrags, Latvia. The port covers and area of 78.35 hectares (193.6 acres).
