= Ab Granit Oy =

Former Finnish granite quarrying and construction company (1886–1964)

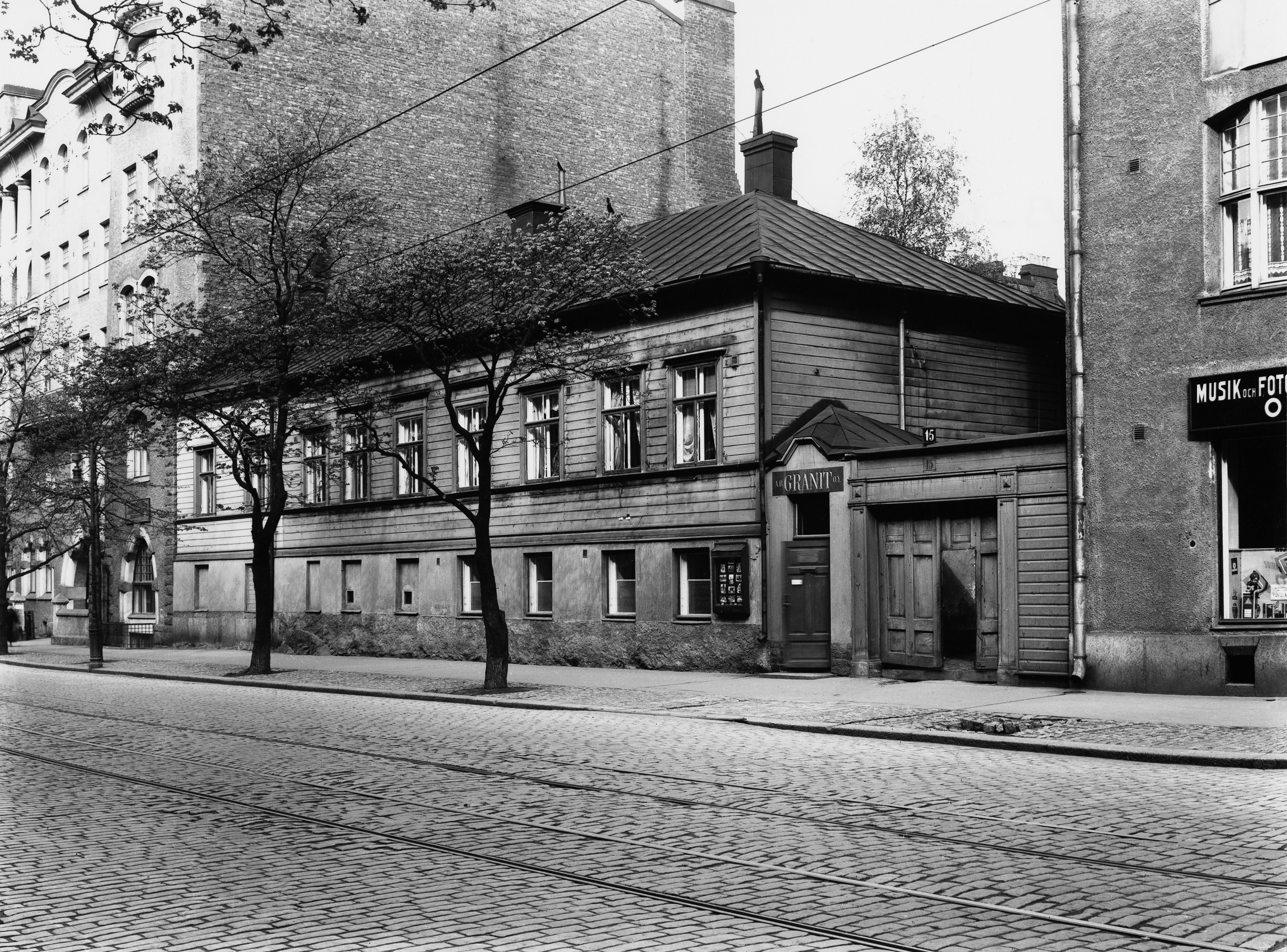
Ab Granit Oy Helsinki office, 1929

Share of the AB Ganit, issued 11 October 1889

Ab Granit Oy (The Granite Company, Ltd.), or just Granit, was a Finnish granite quarrying and construction company extant 1886–1964. It was founded by Anton von Alfthan in the town of Hanko, where it was based until 1940. An outcrop of good red granite suitable for extraction was located near the town. Ab Granit Oy established granite as a significant industry in Finland (which at this time was under the suzerainty of the Russian Empire). The company soon became a major municipal presence in the town.

From the beginning, Ab Granit Oy engaged in finishing, export, and some installation of granite as well as quarrying. Even in its first year, the company provided polished granite columns for the iconic Ateneum building in Helsinki, as well as a bridge in Wenden in Latvia. Their first paving stone project was in 1887 in Helsinki; In 1890, the company established a quarry on the nearby island of Stora Bergö as the granite there was more suitable for paving stones, and quickly opened quarries in various areas around Hanko, including Märaskär Island and Drottningberge. Later, the company provided granite for the building of Helsinki Central Station, Sokos department store, and many other Helsinki buildings.

There were also quarries in other parts of Finland. The company's first plant was in operation until 1928. In 1896 a new plant, made of granite, was established. This building is still extant and can be seen from Hanko harbour.

Ob Granit Oy exported granite to Russia, the Baltic States, Central Europe, England, and the US, and until 1920 had its own fleet of ships. Ob Granit Oy stone is seen in the facings of several buildings in St. Petersburg, including the Fabergé House.

Ab Granit Oy was involved in construction of the Mannerheim Line.

After the 1939-1940 Winter War, the Soviet Union took the Hanko Peninsula and some other areas for its Hanko Naval Base. This disrupted Ob Granit Oy's operations, and the company moved its plant operations to Salo, about 100 kilometres (62 miles) north.

Starting in the 1960s, the company began to experience unsustainable losses and was forced to shed assets. The main business was sold to the Swedish company Granit AB CA Kullgrens Enka, whose parent company went bankrupt in 1977. Granit AB CA Kullgrens Enka was acquired in 1981 by the Swedish firm AKF Granit AB which changed its name to AKF Granit Oy Ab, and in turn went bankrupt in 1995.
