= Russarö =

Island in Finland

Coordinates: 59°46′19″N 22°56′50″E

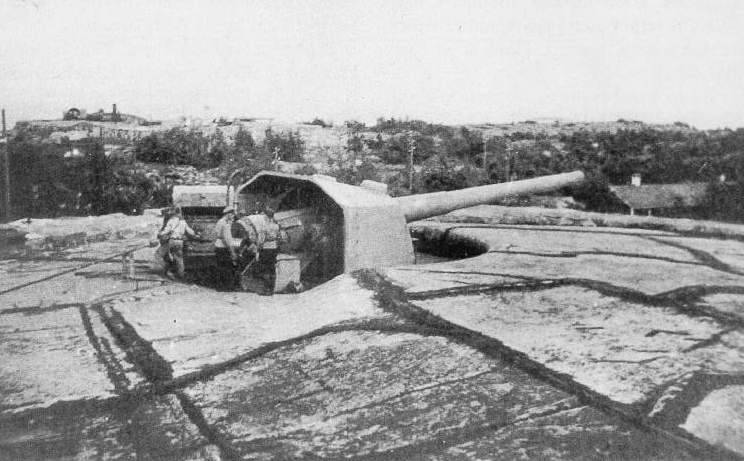
The Finnish 234 mm Coastal artillery in Russarö during the military exercise in the 1930s.

Russarö is an island south of Hanko. The island is closed to the public as it is military area of the Finnish Defence Forces. The island hosts the five-story Russarö Lighthouse built in 1863 and a Finnish Meteorological Institute weather station.

== December 1939 ==
On 1 December 1939, the Soviet light cruiser Kirov, accompanied by the destroyers Stremitelny and Smetlivy, approached the fortified coastal artillery battery located on the island. After a short exchange of fire, Stremitelny and Kirov were hit and the ships withdrew. Aboard the Kirov, 17 men were killed and 30 wounded.

== Climate ==
Climate data for Hanko Russarö (1991-2020 normals, extremes 1959- present)
Month	Jan	Feb	Mar	Apr	May	Jun	Jul	Aug	Sep	Oct	Nov	Dec	Year
Record high °C (°F)	7.6 (45.7)	7.8 (46.0)	10.2 (50.4)	17.7 (63.9)	26.5 (79.7)	28.2 (82.8)	30.5 (86.9)	27.7 (81.9)	22.9 (73.2)	16.3 (61.3)	12.9 (55.2)	9.6 (49.3)	30.5 (86.9)
Mean maximum °C (°F)	4.8 (40.6)	3.7 (38.7)	5.9 (42.6)	11.6 (52.9)	18.8 (65.8)	21.9 (71.4)	25.0 (77.0)	23.7 (74.7)	19.4 (66.9)	14.2 (57.6)	9.6 (49.3)	6.4 (43.5)	25.9 (78.6)
Mean daily maximum °C (°F)	0.6 (33.1)	−0.5 (31.1)	1.7 (35.1)	5.9 (42.6)	11.6 (52.9)	16.4 (61.5)	20.3 (68.5)	19.8 (67.6)	15.5 (59.9)	9.8 (49.6)	5.5 (41.9)	2.7 (36.9)	9.1 (48.4)
Daily mean °C (°F)	−1.3 (29.7)	−2.6 (27.3)	−0.5 (31.1)	3.2 (37.8)	8.5 (47.3)	13.4 (56.1)	17.4 (63.3)	17.2 (63.0)	13.2 (55.8)	8.0 (46.4)	3.9 (39.0)	1.1 (34.0)	6.8 (44.2)
Mean daily minimum °C (°F)	−3.3 (26.1)	−4.6 (23.7)	−2.7 (27.1)	1.1 (34.0)	5.9 (42.6)	11.1 (52.0)	15.0 (59.0)	14.9 (58.8)	11.2 (52.2)	6.2 (43.2)	2.2 (36.0)	−0.9 (30.4)	4.7 (40.4)
Mean minimum °C (°F)	−13.0 (8.6)	−13.3 (8.1)	−9.4 (15.1)	−3.0 (26.6)	1.5 (34.7)	7.0 (44.6)	11.0 (51.8)	10.7 (51.3)	5.9 (42.6)	−0.4 (31.3)	−4.1 (24.6)	−8.5 (16.7)	−15.9 (3.4)
Record low °C (°F)	−33.6 (−28.5)	−30.6 (−23.1)	−21.2 (−6.2)	−13.6 (7.5)	−2.6 (27.3)	3.7 (38.7)	8.2 (46.8)	6.0 (42.8)	1.0 (33.8)	−6.7 (19.9)	−15.0 (5.0)	−27.3 (−17.1)	−33.6 (−28.5)
Source 1: FMI normals 1991-2020
Source 2: Record highs and lows
