= Soviet destroyer Smetlivy (1937) =

Destroyer of the Soviet Navy

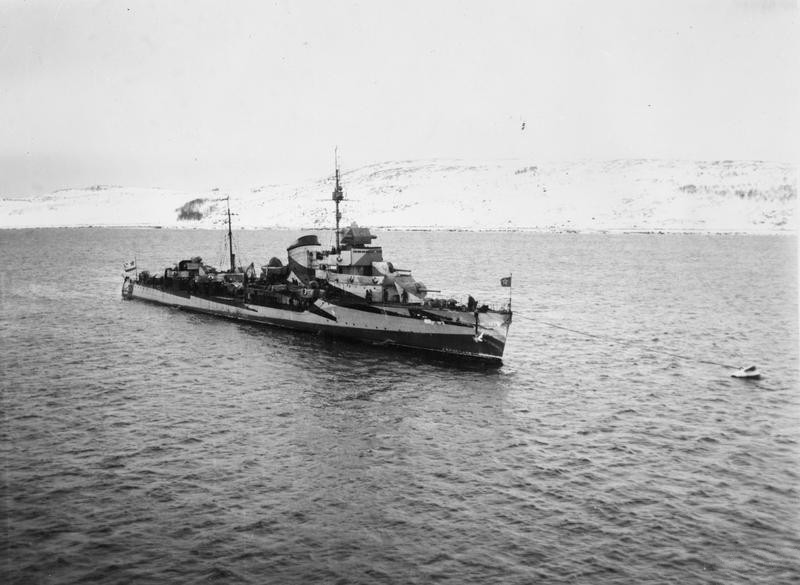
- Aerial view of sister ship Razumny, March 1944

History

Soviet Union
- Name: Smetlivy (Сметливый (Sly))
- Ordered: 2nd Five-Year Plan
- Builder: Shipyard No. 189 (Ordzhonikidze), Leningrad
- Laid down: 17 September 1936
- Launched: 16 July 1937
- Completed: 6 November 1938
- Commissioned: 29 November 1938
- Stricken: 17 February 1956
- Fate: Sunk by mines, 4 November 1941

General characteristics (Gnevny as completed, 1938)
- Class & type: Gnevny-class destroyer
- Displacement: 1,612 t (1,587 long tons) (standard)
- Length: 112.8 m (370 ft 1 in) (o/a)
- Beam: 10.2 m (33 ft 6 in)
- Draft: 4.8 m (15 ft 9 in)
- Installed power: 3 water-tube boilers; 48,000 shp (36,000 kW)
- Propulsion: 2 shafts; 2 geared steam turbines
- Speed: 38 knots (70 km/h; 44 mph)
- Range: 2,720 nmi (5,040 km; 3,130 mi) at 19 knots (35 km/h; 22 mph)
- Complement: 197 (236 wartime)
- Sensors & processing systems: Mars hydrophone
- Armament: 4 × single 130 mm (5.1 in) guns; 2 × single 76.2 mm (3 in) AA guns; 2 × single 45 mm (1.8 in) AA guns; 2 × single 12.7 mm (0.50 in) AA machineguns; 2 × triple 533 mm (21 in) torpedo tubes; 60–96 mines; 2 × depth charge racks, 25 depth charges

Smetlivy (Russian: Сметливый, lit. 'Sly') was one of 29 Gnevny-class destroyers (officially known as Project 7) built for the Soviet Navy during the late 1930s. Completed in 1938, she was assigned to the Baltic Fleet and played a minor role in the 1939–1940 Winter War against Finland. After the start of the German invasion of the Soviet Union (Operation Barbarossa) in June 1941, the ship participated in the Gulf of Riga Campaign before withdrawing to Tallinn, Estonia. Smetlivy supported Soviet forces during the defense of Tallinn in August and covered the subsequent evacuation to Leningrad. The ship provided naval gunfire support to the defenders of Leningrad over the next several months before she was assigned to evacuate Soviet troops from their enclave in Hanko, Finland, in November. Smetlivy struck several mines returning from Hanko and sank with heavy loss of life.

== Design and description ==
Having decided to build the large and expensive 40-knot (74 km/h; 46 mph) Leningrad-class destroyer leaders, the Soviet Navy sought Italian assistance in designing smaller and cheaper destroyers. They licensed the plans for the Folgore class and, in modifying it for their purposes, overloaded a design that was already somewhat marginally stable.

The Gnevnys had an overall length of 112.8 meters (370 ft 1 in), a beam of 10.2 meters (33 ft 6 in), and a draft of 4.8 meters (15 ft 9 in) at deep load. The ships were significantly overweight, almost 200 metric tons (197 long tons) heavier than designed, displacing 1,612 metric tons (1,587 long tons) at standard load and 2,039 metric tons (2,007 long tons) at deep load. Their crew numbered 197 officers and sailors in peacetime and 236 in wartime. The ships had a pair of geared steam turbines, each driving one propeller, rated to produce 48,000 shaft horsepower (36,000 kW) using steam from three water-tube boilers which was intended to give them a maximum speed of 37 knots (69 km/h; 43 mph). The designers had been conservative in rating the turbines and many, but not all, of the ships handily exceeded their designed speed during their sea trials. Others fell considerably short of it, although specific figures for most individual ships have not survived. Variations in fuel oil capacity meant that the range of the Gnevnys varied between 1,670 to 3,145 nautical miles (3,093 to 5,825 km; 1,922 to 3,619 mi) at 19 knots (35 km/h; 22 mph).

As built, the Gnevny-class ships mounted four 130-millimeter (5.1 in) B-13 guns in two pairs of superfiring single mounts fore and aft of the superstructure. Anti-aircraft defense was provided by a pair of 76.2-millimeter (3 in) 34-K AA guns in single mounts and a pair of 45-millimeter (1.8 in) 21-K AA guns as well as two 12.7-millimeter (0.50 in) DK or DShK machine guns. They carried six 533 mm (21.0 in) torpedo tubes in two rotating triple mounts; each tube was provided with a reload. The ships could also carry a maximum of either 60 or 95 mines and 25 depth charges. They were fitted with a set of Mars hydrophones for anti-submarine work, although these were useless at speeds over 3 knots (5.6 km/h; 3.5 mph). The ships were equipped with two K-1 paravanes intended to destroy mines and a pair of depth-charge throwers.

== Construction and service ==
Built in Leningrad's Shipyard No. 189 (Ordzhonike) as yard number 294, Smetlivy was laid down on 17 September 1936, launched on 16 July 1937, and was completed on 6 November 1938. Assigned to the Baltic Fleet, she served on patrol and escort duty during the Winter War, aside from bombarding the coastal artillery positions on the Finnish island of Russarö on 1 December 1939 with her sister ship Stremitelny and the light cruiser Kirov.

When Operation Barbarossa, the German invasion of the Soviet Union, began on 22 June 1941, the destroyer was based in Ust-Dvinsk, Latvia, as part of the 1st Destroyer Division of the fleet's Light Forces Detachment. She participated in the defense of the Gulf of Riga, laying minefields in the Irben Straits during the nights of 24/25 and 26/27 June; she was damaged by two near misses by bombs on 25 June. The ship sailed to Kuivastu, Estonia, on the 27th and then helped to escort Kirov through the Moonsund archipelago to Tallinn, Estonia, three days later as the Soviets evacuated their forces from the Gulf of Riga. Smetlivy steamed to Leningrad for repairs on 15 July which were completed on the 27th.

The ship bombarded German positions during the defense of Tallinn between 24 and 28 August, firing 456 shells from her main guns. She covered the evacuation of Tallinn on 28–29 August as part of the detachment of main forces led by Kirov. Together with the minelayer Marti, Smetlivy laid a minefield off Gogland Island on 10 September. She bombarded German positions on 3–5 October in support amphibious landings in the Peterhof area. On 14 October the destroyer was attached to the group of ships in the River Neva and moved to the Ust-Izhora area to provide gunfire support. Smetlivy supported a local counter-attack near Sinyavino between 20 and 25 October. During 1941 the ship fired a total of 700 shells from her 130 mm guns.

On 4 November she was assigned to the second convoy helping to evacuate the garrison of Hanko to Kronstadt, together with the destroyer Surovy. While loading 560 evacuees, Smetlivy was struck by a Finnish artillery shell. On the return voyage, a mine exploded in her paravanes at 23:10 and knocked out her engines. Twenty minutes later, another mine explosion detonated her forward magazine and blew off her bow all the way back to her bridge. At 23:50 she struck yet another mine that broke her in half, killing over half of her crew and passenger. The ship's stern section sank at 00:30 in the area of Naissaar at 59°41′N 24°10′E. 80 crewmen and 274 evacuees were rescued by the minesweeper T-205 and several patrol boats. Smetlivy was officially struck from the Navy List on 19 November.

== Sources ==
- Balakin, Sergey (2007). Легендарные "семёрки" Эсминцы "сталинской" серии [Legendary Sevens: Stalin's destroyer series] (in Russian). Moscow: Yauza/Eksmo. ISBN 978-5-699-23784-5.
- Berezhnoy, Sergey (2002). Крейсера и миноносцы. Справочник [Guide to Cruisers and Destroyers] (in Russian). Moscow: Voenizdat. ISBN 5-203-01780-8.
- Budzbon, Przemysaw (1980). "Soviet Union". In Chesneau, Roger (ed.). Conway's All the World's Fighting Ships 1922–1946. Greenwich, UK: Conway Maritime Press. pp. 318–346. ISBN 0-85177-146-7.
- Hill, Alexander (2018). Soviet Destroyers of World War II. New Vanguard. Vol. 256. Oxford, UK: Osprey Publishing. ISBN 978-1-4728-2256-7.
- Platonov, Andrey V. (2002). Энциклопедия советских надводных кораблей 1941–1945 [Encyclopedia of Soviet Surface Ships 1941–1945] (in Russian). Saint Petersburg: Poligon. ISBN 5-89173-178-9.
- Rohwer, Jürgen (2005). Chronology of the War at Sea 1939–1945: The Naval History of World War Two (Third Revised ed.). Annapolis, Maryland: Naval Institute Press. ISBN 1-59114-119-2.
- Rohwer, Jürgen & Monakov, Mikhail S. (2001). Stalin's Ocean-Going Fleet. London: Frank Cass. ISBN 0-7146-4895-7.
- Yakubov, Vladimir & Worth, Richard (2008). "The Soviet Project 7/7U Destroyers". In Jordan, John & Dent, Stephen (eds.). Warship 2008. London: Conway. pp. 99–114. ISBN 978-1-84486-062-3.
