= Lake Engure Nature Park =

Protected area in Latvia

- IUCN category II (national park)
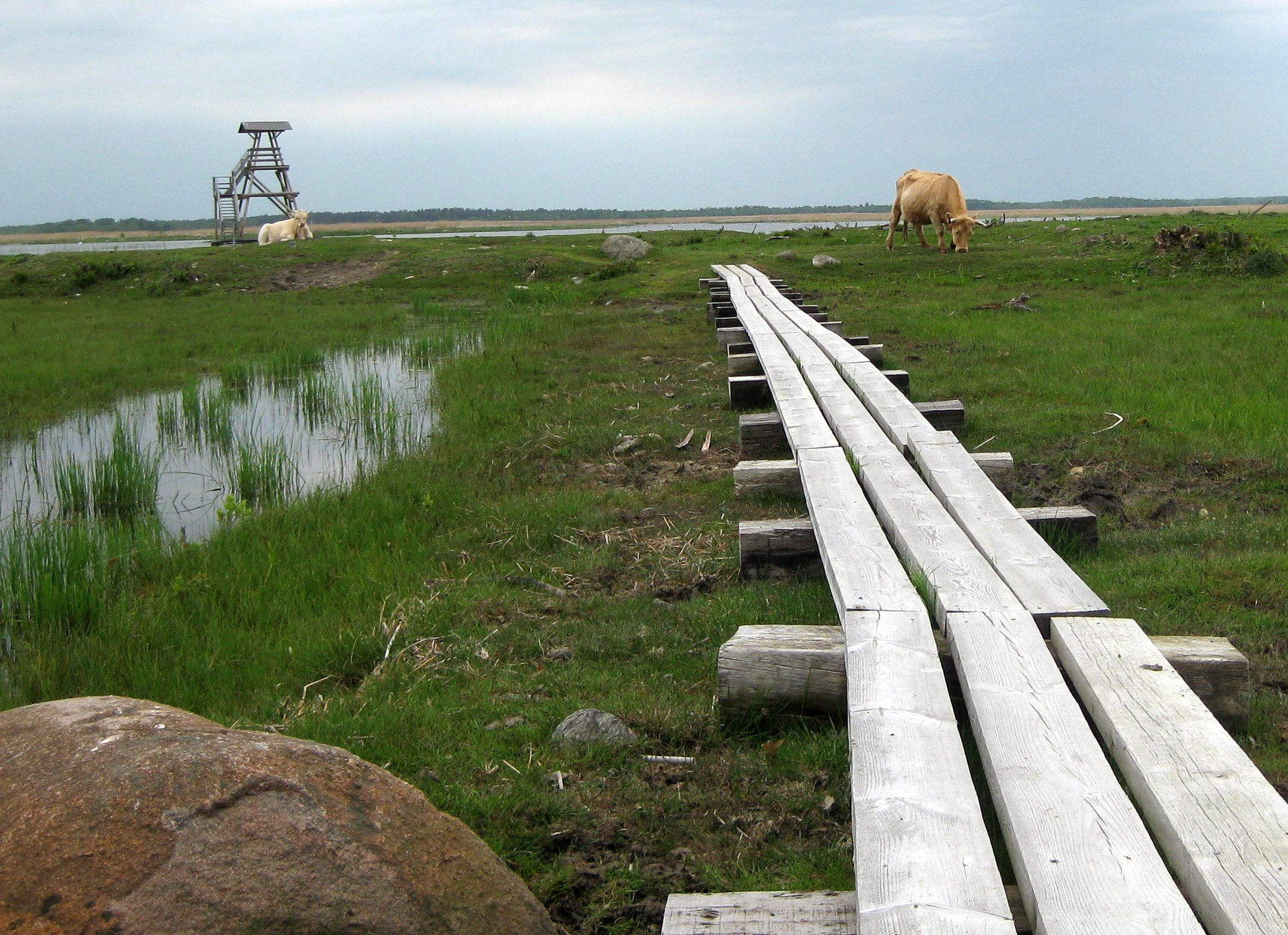

- Location within Latvia
- Location: Latvia
- Coordinates: 57°15′28″N 23°08′49″E
- Area: 12,579 ha (31,080 acres)
- Established: 1957

Lake Engure Nature Park is a protected park in Latvia covering 197.62 km^{2} (76.30 sq mi), named for Lake Engure. It was designated as a nature spot in 1998.

The natural park belongs to the Natura 2000 network which brings together natural sites or semi-natural of the European Union with great heritage value. The text establishing the creation of the Natura 2000 network, the European “habitats, fauna and flora” speaks of natural sites of “community interest”, referring to the “heritage value” of habitats. In the field of nature conservation, we can distinguish habitats, fauna and flora according to their rarity: habitats "of regional interest" are rare in one region, but may be present in abundance elsewhere. . The same goes for habitats "of national interest", then "of European interest". The Natura 2000 network therefore applies to protect rare ecological sites at European level, and representative of the natural heritage of the Member States of the European Union, by fauna and flora exceptional that they contain. More precisely, the Habitats Directive from which the Natura 2000 network has emerged aims to protect “natural habitats”, “fauna” and “flora”. Although these three concepts are inseparable (protecting a natural habitat protects the flora and fauna found there), it would be useless to protect a natural habitat without worrying about the species that live there, and vice versa, to ensure the sustainability of a particular species without worrying about the state of the natural habitat that shelters them.

== Geology ==
Geologically, the protected area is located on the East European Craton. The crystalline bedrock is located at a depth of 1000–1200 meters, with Cambrian Deimena Formation, which in turn has a 99-meter-thick layer of beige shale that distinguishes it from Ordovician rocks. Ordovician detritic sediments lie at a depth of 861–1039 meters. The sediments of Silurian are marl, aleurolite, dolomite (at a depth of 489–861 meters). Devon sediments consist of sandstone and dolomite, which in turn contain Quaternary sediments.

== Flora ==
844 species of vascular plants have been found in the protected area, of which 40 are under nature protection in Latvia, in addition to three other plant species protected by European Union directives. Among the habitat types of the Habitats Directive, there are dune forests, western meadows, swampy deciduous forests, transitional marsh and bog forests and floodplain forests. Low meadows, coastal meadows and dry sandy grasslands on carbonate soil with a foxtail and herb-red button. The lake itself is one of the medium-low-nutrient water bodies with benthic pine algae assemblages. Lake Engure Nature Park has rich fen vegetation. Typical mire communities are represented by associations of rare specimens such as Schoenetum ferruginei and Cladietum marisci. Together with Schoenus ferrugineus and Cladium mariscus, the fen vegetation provides habitat for species that are rare in Latvia — sweet gale (Myrica gale), Dactylorhiza incarnata, Dactylorhiza cruenta, Liparis loeselii, Gymnadenia conopsea and Ophrys insectifera and the rare mosses Irish ruffwort (Moerckia hibernica) and riccardia (Riccardia multifida) also are found there. In addition the alliance, Caricetum lasiocarpae, typical for the coastal lowland of Latvia, is also protected.

== Fauna ==
There are 186 bird species nesting on the lake, of which 44 are under protection. Five species of protected fish also live there. There are 14 species of amphibians and reptiles. Four species are listed in the Red Data Book of Latvia — common spadefoot (Pelobates fuscus), natterjack toad (Bufo calamita), smooth snake (Coronella austriaca) and sand lizard (Lacerta agilis).
