= Soviet destroyer Statny (1939) =

Soviet Storozhevoy-class destroyers

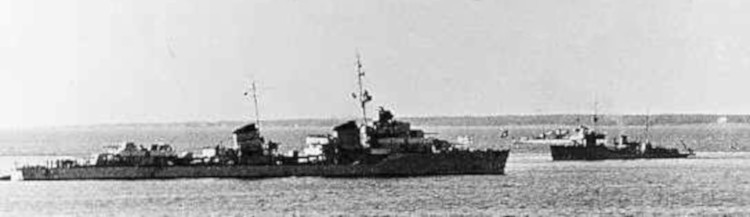
- An unidentified Storozhevoy-class destroyer in the Black Sea

History

Soviet Union
- Name: Statny (Статный (Stately))
- Ordered: 2nd Five-Year Plan
- Builder: Shipyard No. 190 (Zhdanov), Leningrad
- Yard number: 526
- Laid down: 29 December 1938
- Launched: 24 November 1939
- Commissioned: 9 July 1941
- Stricken: 31 August 1941
- Fate: Sank during a storm, 22 August 1941

General characteristics (Storozhevoy, 1941)
- Class & type: Storozhevoy-class destroyer
- Displacement: 1,727 t (1,700 long tons) (standard); 2,279 t (2,243 long tons) (full load)
- Length: 112.5 m (369 ft 1 in) (o/a)
- Beam: 10.2 m (33 ft 6 in)
- Draft: 3.98 m (13 ft 1 in)
- Installed power: 4 water-tube boilers; 54,000 shp (40,000 kW) (trials)
- Propulsion: 2 shafts, 2 steam turbine sets
- Speed: 40.3 knots (74.6 km/h; 46.4 mph) (trials)
- Endurance: 2,700 nmi (5,000 km; 3,100 mi) at 19 knots (35 km/h; 22 mph)
- Complement: 207 (271 wartime)
- Sensors & processing systems: Mars hydrophones
- Armament: 4 × single 130 mm (5.1 in) guns; 2 × single 76.2 mm (3 in) AA guns; 3 × single 45 mm (1.8 in) AA guns; 4 × single 12.7 mm (0.50 in) DK or DShK machine guns; 2 × triple 533 mm (21 in) torpedo tubes; 58–96 mines; 30 depth charges

Statny (Russian: Статный, lit. 'Stately') was one of 18 Storozhevoy-class destroyers (officially known as Project 7U) built for the Soviet Navy during the late 1930s. Although she began construction as a Project 7 Gnevny-class destroyer, Statny was completed in 1941 to the modified Project 7U design.

The destroyer entered service in July of that year, a month after the beginning of Operation Barbarossa, and shelled German positions on the Gulf of Riga coast in early August. While evading air attack on 18 August, she struck a mine that blew off her bow. Statny grounded and was abandoned before sinking during a storm on 22 August following a failed salvage effort to pump out water from her flooded compartments. Her wreck was salvaged for scrap in 1957.

== Design and description ==
Originally built as a Gnevny-class ship, Statny and her sister ships were completed to the modified Project 7U design after Joseph Stalin, General Secretary of the Communist Party of the Soviet Union, ordered that the latter be built with their boilers arranged en echelon, instead of linked as in the Gnevnys, so that a ship could still move with one or two boilers disabled.

Like the Gnevnys, the Project 7U destroyers had an overall length of 112.5 meters (369 ft 1 in) and a beam of 10.2 meters (33 ft 6 in), but they had a reduced draft of 3.98 meters (13 ft 1 in) at deep load. The ships were slightly overweight, displacing 1,727 metric tons (1,700 long tons) at standard load and 2,279 metric tons (2,243 long tons) at deep load. The crew complement of the Storozhevoy class numbered 207 in peacetime, but this increased to 271 in wartime, as more personnel were needed to operate additional equipment. Each ship had a pair of geared steam turbines, each driving one propeller, rated to produce 54,000 shaft horsepower (40,000 kW) using steam from four water-tube boilers, which the designers expected would exceed the 37-knot (69 km/h; 43 mph) speed of the Project 7s because there was additional steam available. Some fell short of it, although specific figures for most individual ships have not survived. Variations in fuel oil capacity meant that the range of the Project 7Us varied from 1,380 to 2,700 nautical miles (2,560 to 5,000 km; 1,590 to 3,110 mi) at 19 knots (35 km/h; 22 mph), that upper figure demonstrated by Storozhevoy.

The Project 7U-class ships mounted four 130-millimeter (5.1 in) B-13 guns in two pairs of superfiring single mounts fore and aft of the superstructure. Anti-aircraft defense was provided by a pair of 76.2-millimeter (3 in) 34-K AA guns in single mounts and three 45-millimeter (1.8 in) 21-K AA guns, as well as four 12.7-millimeter (0.50 in) DK or DShK machine guns. They carried six 533 mm (21.0 in) torpedo tubes in two rotating triple mounts amidships. The ships could also carry a maximum of 58 to 96 mines and 30 depth charges. They were fitted with a set of Mars hydrophones for anti-submarine work, although these were useless at speeds over 3 knots (5.6 km/h; 3.5 mph).

== Construction and career ==
Statny was laid down at Shipyard No. 190 (Zhdanov) in Leningrad with the yard number 518 on 26 December 1936 as a Gnevny-class destroyer. She was relaid down as a Project 7U destroyer on 29 December 1938, and launched on 24 November 1939. After completing her trials in June 1941, the destroyer was accepted by a state commission on 9 July and entered service with the Baltic Fleet on 18 July, almost a month after the beginning of Operation Barbarossa, the German invasion of the Soviet Union, on 22 June. During August, she and her sister Surovy shelled German positions on the coast of the Gulf of Riga, expending 111 main-gun rounds on a coastal artillery battery near Ainaži on 6 August and 72 on the railway station and jetty of Mērsrags two days later; she escaped unscathed from the return fire from coastal batteries on both occasions.

While anchored in the Rohuküla roadstead in the Moonsund on 18 August, Statny came under German air attack at 10:10 and weighed anchor, but struck a German bottom mine fifteen minutes later while carrying out evasive maneuvers. The forward portion of her bow was blown off and sank within ten minutes; her captain was among those killed in the explosion. The bow section and the forward boiler room flooded almost instantly, and as crewmen evacuated the forward engine room and second boiler room they failed to close the hatches, allowing the flooding to continue into those compartments. After a failed attempt to reverse, the destroyer grounded at a depth of 7–8 meters (23–26 ft). At 12:00 the rescue ship Saturn approached and attempted to pump out the water from the flooded compartments, but was forced to withdraw until nightfall due to another air raid. This process continued for three and a half days as the compartments were drained by the pumps at night, but flooded again during the day. The destroyer was abandoned after a storm broke out, and rolled over to port and sank on 22 August. She was struck from the Navy List on 31 August. In 1957, the wreck was raised and towed to Tallinn for scrapping.

== Sources ==
- Balakin, Sergey (2007). Легендарные "семёрки" Эсминцы "сталинской" серии [Legendary Sevens: Stalin's Destroyer Series] (in Russian). Moscow: Yauza/Eksmo. ISBN 978-5-699-23784-5.
- Berezhnoy, Sergey (2002). Крейсера и миноносцы. Справочник [Guide to Cruisers and Destroyers] (in Russian). Moscow: Voenizdat. ISBN 5-203-01780-8.
- Hill, Alexander (2018). Soviet Destroyers of World War II. New Vanguard. Vol. 256. Oxford, UK: Osprey Publishing. ISBN 978-1-4728-2256-7.
- Rohwer, Jürgen (2005). Chronology of the War at Sea 1939–1945: The Naval History of World War Two (Third Revised ed.). Annapolis, Maryland: Naval Institute Press. ISBN 1-59114-119-2.
- Rohwer, Jürgen & Monakov, Mikhail S. (2001). Stalin's Ocean-Going Fleet. London: Frank Cass. ISBN 0-7146-4895-7.
- Yakubov, Vladimir & Worth, Richard (2008). "The Soviet Project 7/7U Destroyers". In Jordan, John & Dent, Stephen (eds.). Warship 2008. London: Conway. pp. 99–114. ISBN 978-1-84486-062-3.
