= Soviet destroyer Stremitelny =

Stremitelny (Russian: Стремительный, lit. 'Impetuous') is the name of the following ships of the Soviet Navy:

- Soviet destroyer Stremitelny (1937), a Gnevny-class destroyer, sunk by aircraft in 1941
- Soviet destroyer Stremitelny (1949), a Skory-class destroyer
