= Russarö Lighthouse =

Lighthouse in Finland

Russarö Lighthouse Russarö
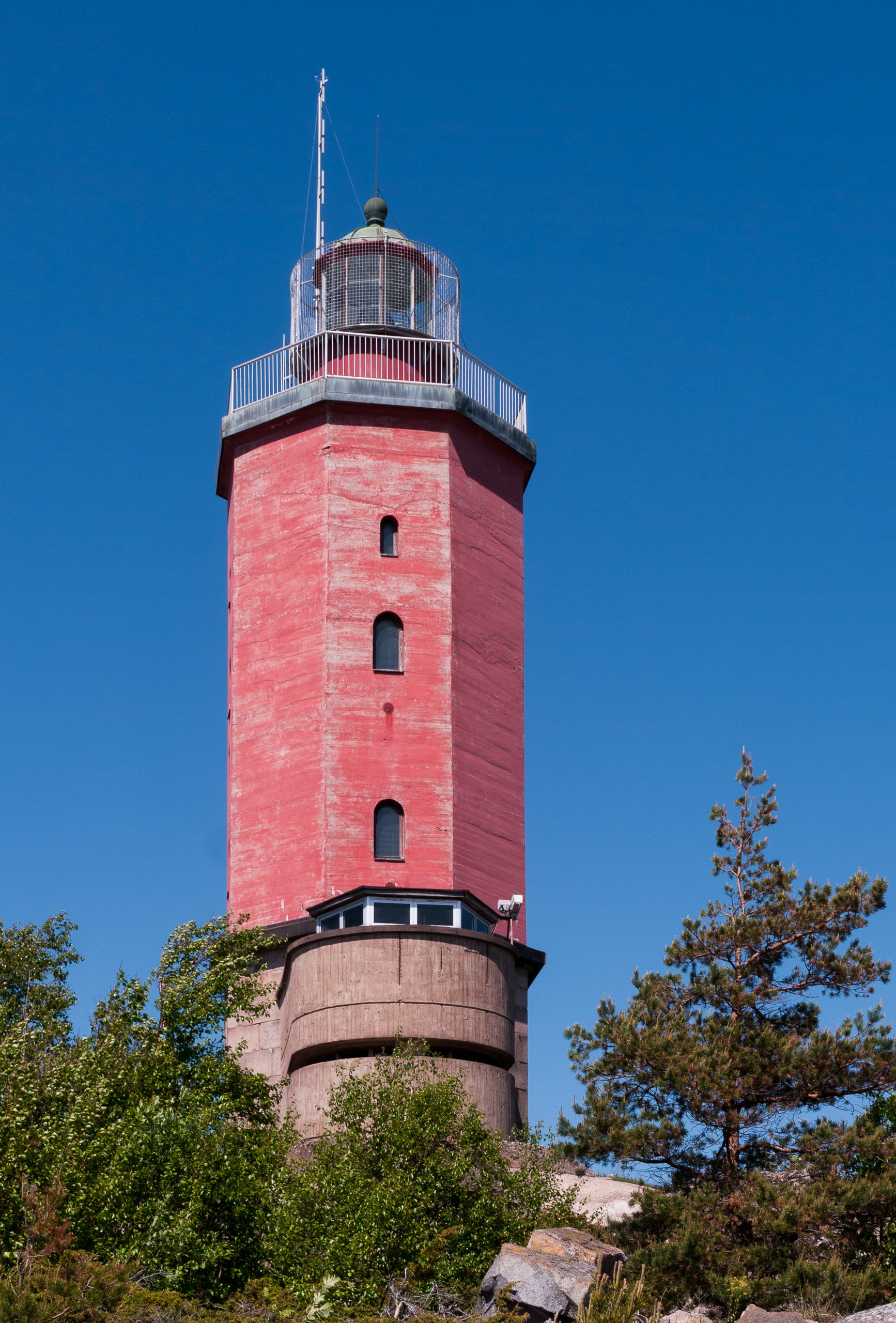
- Russarö lighthouse in 2013
- Location: Gulf of Finland, Baltic Sea
- Coordinates: 59.773333°N 22.943333°E

Tower
- Constructed: 1863
- Foundation: Granite
- Construction: Brick
- Automated: 1949
- Height: 21 m (69 ft)
- Shape: Octagonal
- Markings: Red
- Power source: electricity

Light
- First lit: 1863
- Focal height: 34.2 m (112 ft)
- Range: 16.9 nmi (31.3 km; 19.4 mi)
- Characteristic: Fl(4) W 45s

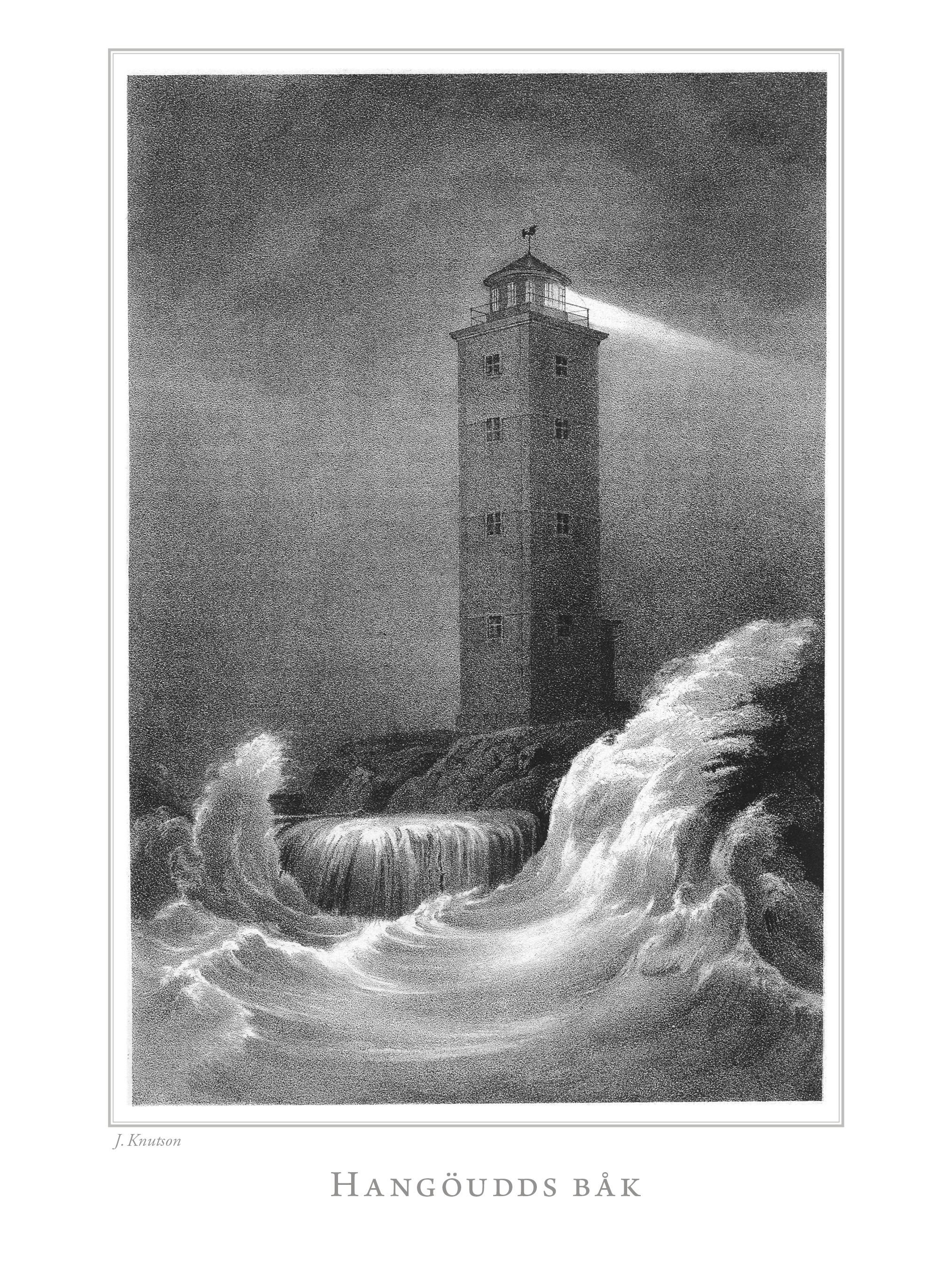
The lighthouse of Russarö illustrated in Finland framstäldt i teckningar (published 1845–1852) where Russarö is called Rotsaari kala.

Russarö Lighthouse (Finnish: Russarön majakka, Swedish: Russarö fyr) is a lighthouse situated on the island of Russarö, outside Hanko, Finland, at the western extremity of the Gulf of Finland in the Baltic Sea. It is commonly known as Hangon silmä (lit. 'The Eye of Hanko').

Earlier unilluminated daymarks and lighthouses existed on the spot, dating back to 1815. The current lighthouse was built in 1863, making it one of the oldest surviving lighthouses in Finland. It was the first in Finland to operate also during winter months, due to the Port of Hanko being in the 19th century the only port open throughout the year.

Constructed of bricks and mortar over a granite base, the lighthouse is octagonal in shape and comprises five storeys. The top floor features a beautiful vaulted ceiling. The base is natural stone colour (brown), the main tower red.

In the summer months, day cruises to the island of Russarö are operated from Hanko's Eastern Harbour. However, due to the dilapidated state of the lighthouse, visitors are no longer allowed entry into the tower.
