= Soviet destroyer Surovy (1940) =

Soviet destroyer

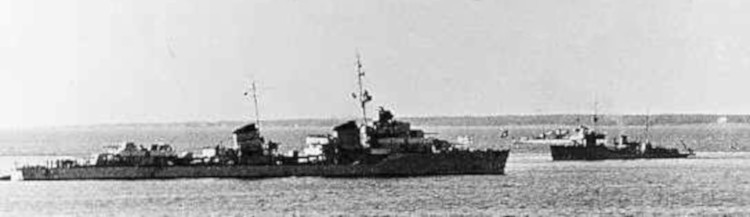
- An unidentified Storozhevoy-class destroyer in the Black Sea

History

Soviet Union
- Name: Surovy (Суровый (Severe))
- Ordered: 2nd Five-Year Plan
- Builder: Shipyard No. 189 (Sergo Ordzhonikidze), Leningrad
- Yard number: 297
- Laid down: 1 February 1939
- Launched: 5 August 1939
- Commissioned: 31 May 1941
- Fate: Scuttled, 13 November 1941

General characteristics (Storozhevoy, 1941)
- Class & type: Storozhevoy-class destroyer
- Displacement: 1,727 t (1,700 long tons) (standard); 2,279 t (2,243 long tons) (full load)
- Length: 112.5 m (369 ft 1 in) (o/a)
- Beam: 10.2 m (33 ft 6 in)
- Draft: 3.98 m (13 ft 1 in)
- Installed power: 4 water-tube boilers; 54,000 shp (40,000 kW) (trials)
- Propulsion: 2 shafts, 2 steam turbine sets
- Speed: 40.3 knots (74.6 km/h; 46.4 mph) (trials)
- Endurance: 2,700 nmi (5,000 km; 3,100 mi) at 19 knots (35 km/h; 22 mph)
- Complement: 207 (271 wartime)
- Sensors & processing systems: Mars hydrophones
- Armament: 4 × single 130 mm (5.1 in) guns; 2 × single 76.2 mm (3 in) AA guns; 3 × single 45 mm (1.8 in) AA guns; 4 × single 12.7 mm (0.50 in) DK or DShK machine guns; 2 × triple 533 mm (21 in) torpedo tubes; 58–96 mines; 30 depth charges

Surovy (Russian: Суровый, lit. 'Severe') was one of 18 Storozhevoy-class destroyers (officially known as Project 7U) built for the Soviet Navy during the late 1930s. Although she began construction as a Project 7 Gnevny-class destroyer, Surovy was completed in 1941 to the modified Project 7U design.

Entering service just before the beginning of Operation Barbarossa, she participated in minelaying operations and provided naval gunfire support from late June to early August. Engaging a German convoy without result on 21 August, she was damaged by a mine during the evacuation of Tallinn, Estonia, but limped back to Leningrad for repairs that lasted for most of September. After a month of shore bombardments during the Siege of Leningrad, the destroyer participated in the evacuation of Hanko Naval Base in early November, and was scuttled after being crippled by a mine during the latter on 13 November.

== Design and description ==
Originally built as a Gnevny-class ship, Surovy and her sister ships were completed to the modified Project 7U design after Joseph Stalin, General Secretary of the Communist Party of the Soviet Union, ordered that the latter be built with their boilers arranged en echelon, instead of linked as in the Gnevnys, so that a ship could still move with one or two boilers disabled.

Like the Gnevnys, the Project 7U destroyers had an overall length of 112.5 meters (369 ft 1 in) and a beam of 10.2 meters (33 ft 6 in), but they had a reduced draft of 3.98 meters (13 ft 1 in) at deep load. The ships were slightly overweight, displacing 1,727 metric tons (1,700 long tons) at standard load and 2,279 metric tons (2,243 long tons) at deep load. The crew complement of the Storozhevoy class numbered 207 in peacetime, but this increased to 271 in wartime, as more personnel were needed to operate additional equipment. Each ship had a pair of geared steam turbines, each driving one propeller, rated to produce 54,000 shaft horsepower (40,000 kW) using steam from four water-tube boilers, which the designers expected would exceed the 37-knot (69 km/h; 43 mph) speed of the Project 7s because there was additional steam available. Some fell short of it, although specific figures for most individual ships have not survived. Variations in fuel oil capacity meant that the range of the Project 7Us varied from 1,380 to 2,700 nautical miles (2,560 to 5,000 km; 1,590 to 3,110 mi) at 19 knots (35 km/h; 22 mph), that upper figure demonstrated by Storozhevoy.

The Project 7U-class ships mounted four 130-millimeter (5.1 in) B-13 guns in two pairs of superfiring single mounts fore and aft of the superstructure. Anti-aircraft defense was provided by a pair of 76.2-millimeter (3 in) 34-K AA guns in single mounts and three 45-millimeter (1.8 in) 21-K AA guns, as well as four 12.7-millimeter (0.50 in) DK or DShK machine guns. They carried six 533 mm (21.0 in) torpedo tubes in two rotating triple mounts amidships. The ships could also carry a maximum of 58 to 96 mines and 30 depth charges. They were fitted with a set of Mars hydrophones for anti-submarine work, although these were useless at speeds over 3 knots (5.6 km/h; 3.5 mph).

== Construction and career ==
Surovy was laid down at Shipyard No. 189 (Sergo Ordzhonikidze) in Leningrad as yard number 297 on 27 October 1936 as a Gnevny-class destroyer with the name Letuchy. She was relaid down as a Project 7U destroyer on 1 February 1939, and launched on 5 August 1939. Renamed Surovy on 25 September 1940, the ship was accepted by a state commission on 31 May 1941 and joined the 5th Destroyer Division of the Baltic Fleet on 18 June when the Soviet naval jack was raised aboard her. When Operation Barbarossa, the German invasion of the Soviet Union, began four days later, Surovy was still based at Kronstadt, quickly relocating to Tallinn. She participated in minelaying operations in the Gulf of Finland on 29 June, and bombarded German positions in support of the 8th Army on the coast of Narva Bay on 23 July. In the latter, the 186 main-gun rounds that the ship fired were credited with destroying five mortars and various structures.

During August, Surovy and her sister ship Statny made two raids in the Gulf of Riga; the former under the flag of Light Forces Detachment commander Counter Admiral Valentin Drozd. The destroyer bombarded a German battery at Salacgrīva, firing sixty 130 mm shells, on 6 August, and two days later fired 24 more shells at a pier in Roja. On the return voyage she evaded two German air attacks. With the old destroyer Artem, she steamed to the Gulf of Riga on 21 August to intercept a convoy of two transports with escorts that had been spotted by aerial reconnaissance. Surovy fired one hundred forty-five 130 mm shells at one of the transports and erroneously reported its sinking, while escaping unscathed from German air attack as she was departing the area. While steaming from Moonsund to Tallinn on 27 August, the detonation of a mine in her paravanes caused a shockwave that damaged the foundation of boiler No. 3 and disabled other machinery. Another mine exploded in one of her paravanes during the Evacuation of Tallinn between 28 and 30 August, but the destroyer managed to reach Kronstadt. She was repaired at the Baltic Shipyard in Leningrad from 3 to 23 September, and Surovy bombarded German positions during the Siege of Leningrad after the completion of her repairs until the end of October, first from the Kronstadt roadstead and then from the Neva River, firing a total of 450 shells.

The destroyer, her sister Smetlivy, and smaller craft departed Kronstadt for the evacuation of the Hanko Naval Base on 3 November. Although Smetlivy was sunk by a mine on the return voyage, the remaining ships evacuated 1,200 of the Hanko defenders to Kronstadt and Leningrad. With the destroyer Gordy, the minelayer Ural, four minesweepers, six torpedo boats, and the submarine L-2 she departed Kronstadt on 13 November to evacuate the remaining garrison of Hanko, on what proved to be her last voyage. After midnight, the ships ran into a minefield and early on 14 November Surovy collided with the stalled minesweeper T-217; the collision caused a 4 m^{2} (43 sq ft) hole above her waterline. The latter was sealed with bedding, but minutes later her paravane detonated a mine four to five meters (13 to 16 ft) from the hull, knocking out power in several compartments and deforming the hull. This resulted in split seams, enabling flooding in her boiler and turbine rooms that created an eight-degree list to port after the turbofans and pumps failed. Although the crew extinguished a fire in one boiler room, raised steam in another, and restarted the turbogenerator and diesel generator in a machine room, the pumps could not cope with the flooding and the list reached twelve degrees at 05:00. As a result, her captain ordered the crew to abandon ship and about twenty minutes later they had been completely transferred to a minesweeper. The destroyer quickly sank after the explosion of her depth charges. Surovy was officially struck from the Navy List on 19 November.

== Wreck ==
The wreck of the Surovy was first discovered in 2008 during a Estonian Maritime Administrations hydrographic survey. The ship was identified in August of 2015 by Mihhail Ivanov, who dove on the wreck and identified it by the bronze name on the transom of the ship.

In July of 2018, a sonar study was carried out on the wreck as a part of the Estonian National heritage Board (et) project "Mapping, Documentation, and Risk Assessment of Environmentally Hazardous Wrecks." The wreck is at a depth of 83 meters. The wreck is lying on its port side, the bow section of the ship from the third boiler onward is completely is destroyed with pieces of it scattered in about a 200 by 200 meter area. The stern of the ship appears to be in a good condition, with superstructures, two 130mm guns and a 76.2mm anti-air gun still being in place.

== Sources ==
- Balakin, Sergey (2007). Легендарные "семёрки" Эсминцы "сталинской" серии [Legendary Sevens: Stalin's Destroyer Series] (in Russian). Moscow: Yauza/Eksmo. ISBN 978-5-699-23784-5.
- Berezhnoy, Sergey (2002). Крейсера и миноносцы. Справочник [Guide to Cruisers and Destroyers] (in Russian). Moscow: Voenizdat. ISBN 5-203-01780-8.
- Hill, Alexander (2018). Soviet Destroyers of World War II. New Vanguard. Vol. 256. Oxford, UK: Osprey Publishing. ISBN 978-1-4728-2256-7.
- Platonov, Andrey V. (2002). Энциклопедия советских надводных кораблей 1941–1945 [Encyclopedia of Soviet Surface Ships 1941–1945] (in Russian). Saint Petersburg: Poligon. ISBN 5-89173-178-9.
- Rohwer, Jürgen & Monakov, Mikhail S. (2001). Stalin's Ocean-Going Fleet. London: Frank Cass. ISBN 0-7146-4895-7.
- Yakubov, Vladimir & Worth, Richard (2008). "The Soviet Project 7/7U Destroyers". In Jordan, John & Dent, Stephen (eds.). Warship 2008. London: Conway. pp. 99–114. ISBN 978-1-84486-062-3.
