= Alauksts =

Natural lake in Cēsis Municipality, Latvia

- Alauksta ezers
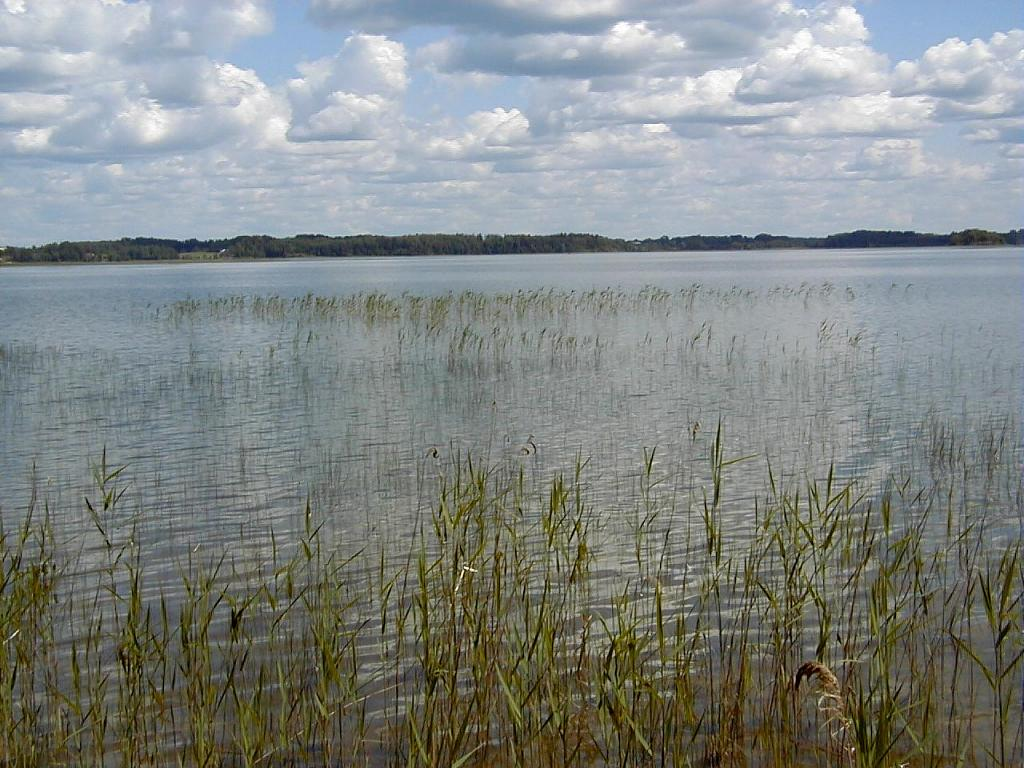
- Alauksts along the Cēsis–Madona road

- Location within Latvia
- Location: Latvia
- Coordinates: 57°05′37″N 25°46′12″E
- Primary outflows: Silakroga grāvis, Gaujiņa
- Catchment area: 14.8 km^{2} (5.7 sq mi)
- Max. width: 4.8 km^{2} (1.9 sq mi)
- Surface area: 7.75 m^{2} (83.4 sq ft)
- Average depth: 3.3 m (11 ft)
- Max. depth: 7 m (23 ft)
- Water volume: 0.0258 km^{3} (0.0062 cu mi)
- Surface elevation: 202.3 m (664 ft)
- Islands: 2

Alauksts (also Alauksta ezers) is a natural lake in Vecpiebalga Parish, Cēsis Municipality, Latvia. It is 202.3 metres above sea level at the Vidzeme Upland.

Alauksts is a part of the Vecpiebalga Protected Landscape Area. The lake is oval, with its long axis running NW-SE. The lake has two islands — Lielā sala ('Large Island', 0,8 ha) and Mazā sala (also Vidsniedre, 'Small Island', 0,76 ha).

The lake bed is partially covered by mud and a layer of sapropel up to 5 meters high. The coastline is mostly flat, with exceptions in the south. The Gaujiņa, which later expands into the Gauja, the longest river of Latvia, flows out of Alauksts. The Silakrogs Canal (Silakroga grāvis), which was built in the 19th century, originates from Alauksts and flows towards Tauns Lake.

Nine species of fish have been observed in the lake (common roach, bream, pike, perch, chub etc.). It is eutrophic lake with considerable amounts of toxic green algae.

The paved Cēsis—Madona (P30) road is located along the lake's SW coast, on the SE coast — the Vecpiebalga—Greiveri dirt road.

== Placenames in Alauksts ==
- Cepļa gals — west side
- Elka kalns — western shoal
- Kakta gals — east side
- Karašas līcis — north side
- Vidsniedre — reed patch in the west

== See also ==
- List of lakes of Latvia
