= Pape Nature Reserve =

Nature park in Latvia

Pape Nature Park
- IUCN category II (national park)
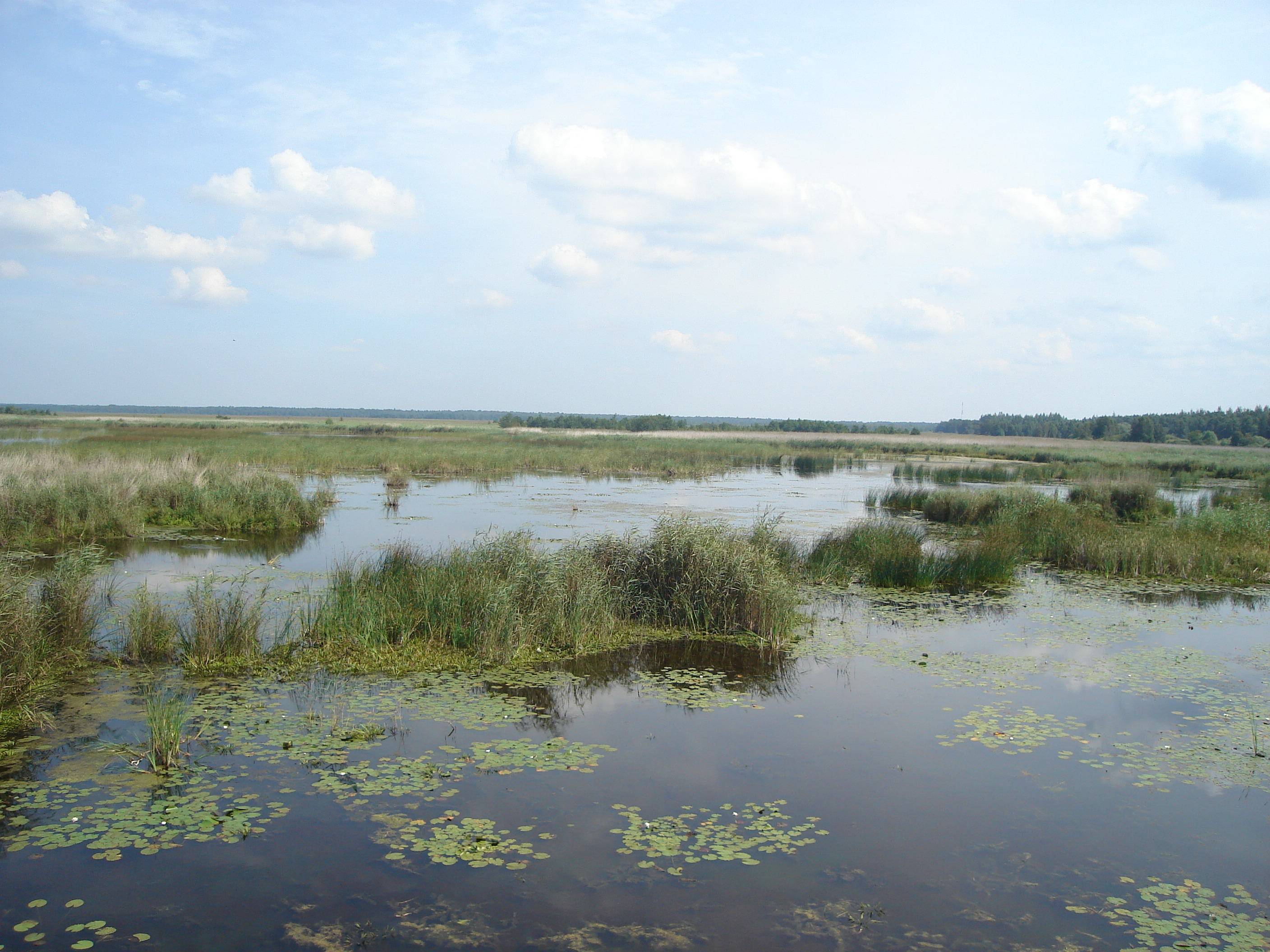

- Location within Latvia
- Location: Latvia
- Coordinates: 56°12′N 21°03′E
- Area: 10,866 ha (26,850 acres)
- Established: 1977

Pape Nature Reserve is a nature reserve in Latvia. It is located about 15 km (9 mi) south of Liepāja. It stretches over 5700 ha and consists mainly of bogs, carr forests and dunes around Lake Pape. It is an important site for migrating birds. Every autumn about 50,000 birds rest in the reserve. Large grazers, like heck cattle, konik horse and European bison have been introduced to the reserve with support of the WWF. There is a visitor centre in the reserve.

== Fauna ==
Heck cattle and horses were introduced in 1999, European bison were introduced a few years later. In 2007 there were more than 80 heck cattle and more than 100 horses in the reserve. European bison were still below 20 and slowly increasing. Before the introduction of the three large herbivore species, the reserve was already home to moose, red deer, roe deer, wolf and lynx. So the reserve harbours now an almost complete Holocene mammal fauna.
