= Lake Engure =

Lake in Latvia

- Engures ezers (Latvian)
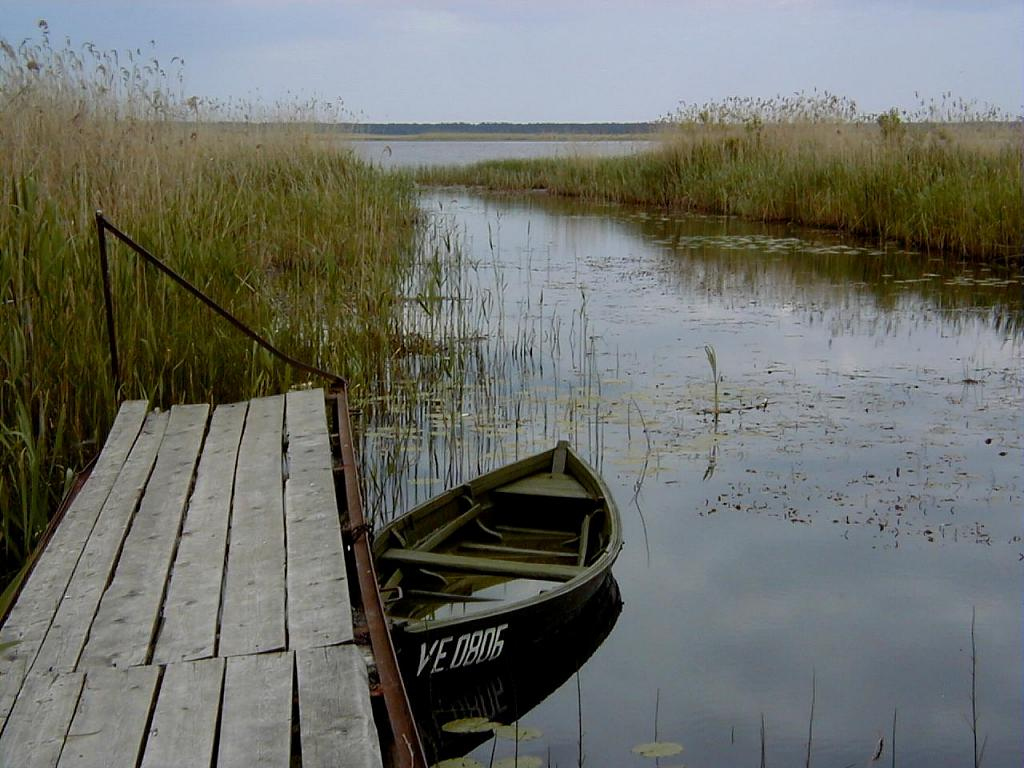
- Eastern coast of Lake Engure

- Location within Latvia
- Location: Talsi district
- Coordinates: 57°16′N 23°06′E
- Primary outflows: Mersraga channel
- Catchment area: 644 km^{2} (249 sq mi)
- Basin countries: Latvia
- Max. length: 17.9 km (11.1 mi)
- Max. width: 4.4 km (2.7 mi)
- Surface area: 40.46 km^{2} (15.62 sq mi)
- Average depth: 0.4 m (1 ft 4 in)
- Max. depth: 2.1 m (6 ft 11 in)
- Water volume: 0.0168 km^{3} (13,600 acre⋅ft)
- Surface elevation: 3.2 m (10 ft)
- Islands: 9 (largest: Liela sala, Apalrova, Kazrova)
- Settlements: Mērsrags

Ramsar Wetland
- Designated: 25 July 1995
- Reference no.: 738

Lake Engure (Latvian: Engures ezers) is a shallow coastal lake in the Gulf of Riga of the Baltic Sea, located in north-western Latvia (Talsi district). It is the third largest lake in the country after Lake Lubāns and Lake Rāzna. Covering about 45 km^{2} within a 644 km^{2} catchment, it is the largest relict water body along Latvia's coast. The lake formed as a remnant of the Littorina Sea roughly 4,000 years ago and lies at the heart of the Lake Engure Nature Park, a wetland protected under the Ramsar Convention (1971).

The whole lake and its vicinity have been included in the Lake Engure Nature Park since 1999, although the first natural reserve was established here in 1957. It contains a floating base for ornithologists.

== Geography and hydrology ==
Lake Engure occupies a low-lying basin bounded to the west by the long, sandy Engure Spit, which separates it from the open sea. In 1842, the digging of the Mērsrags Canal lowered the lake's water level by some 1.5 m and halved its surface area, creating today’s uniformly shallow profile. The lake's average depth is just 0.4 m, with a maximum of 2.1 m; inflow comes from several small rivers in its drainage basin, while the canal maintains a direct exchange with the Gulf of Riga, moderating both water level and salinity.

== Ecology ==
The lake's clear-water state is maintained by extensive beds of charophyte algae, which absorb and sequester phosphorus, thereby preventing algal blooms. Its shoreline habitats range from dense reed beds and open mesic meadows to oligotrophic pine forests atop the sandy dunes of the Engure Spit. Fish surveys record 16 resident species, down from over 20 in the 1930s—a decline linked to historic water-level alterations. Lake Engure is of international importance for water birds, supporting more than 180 breeding species and serving as a crucial staging post on migratory flyways.

== Conservation and management ==
As part of the Lake Engure Nature Park, the lake and its surrounding wetlands have been protected under the Ramsar Convention since 1995 and incorporated into the Natura 2000 network in 2004. Management measures include regulated water-level control, periodic removal of overgrown reeds and shrubs to maintain open nesting sites, and predator control targeting invasive American mink (Neovison vison) and raccoon dog (Nyctereutes procyonoides). Ongoing, long-term ecological monitoring by national and local agencies informs adaptive conservation practices that aim to balance habitat preservation with sustainable regional land use.
