= Lake Rychy =

Lake in Belarus and Latvia

Rychy / Richi / Riču
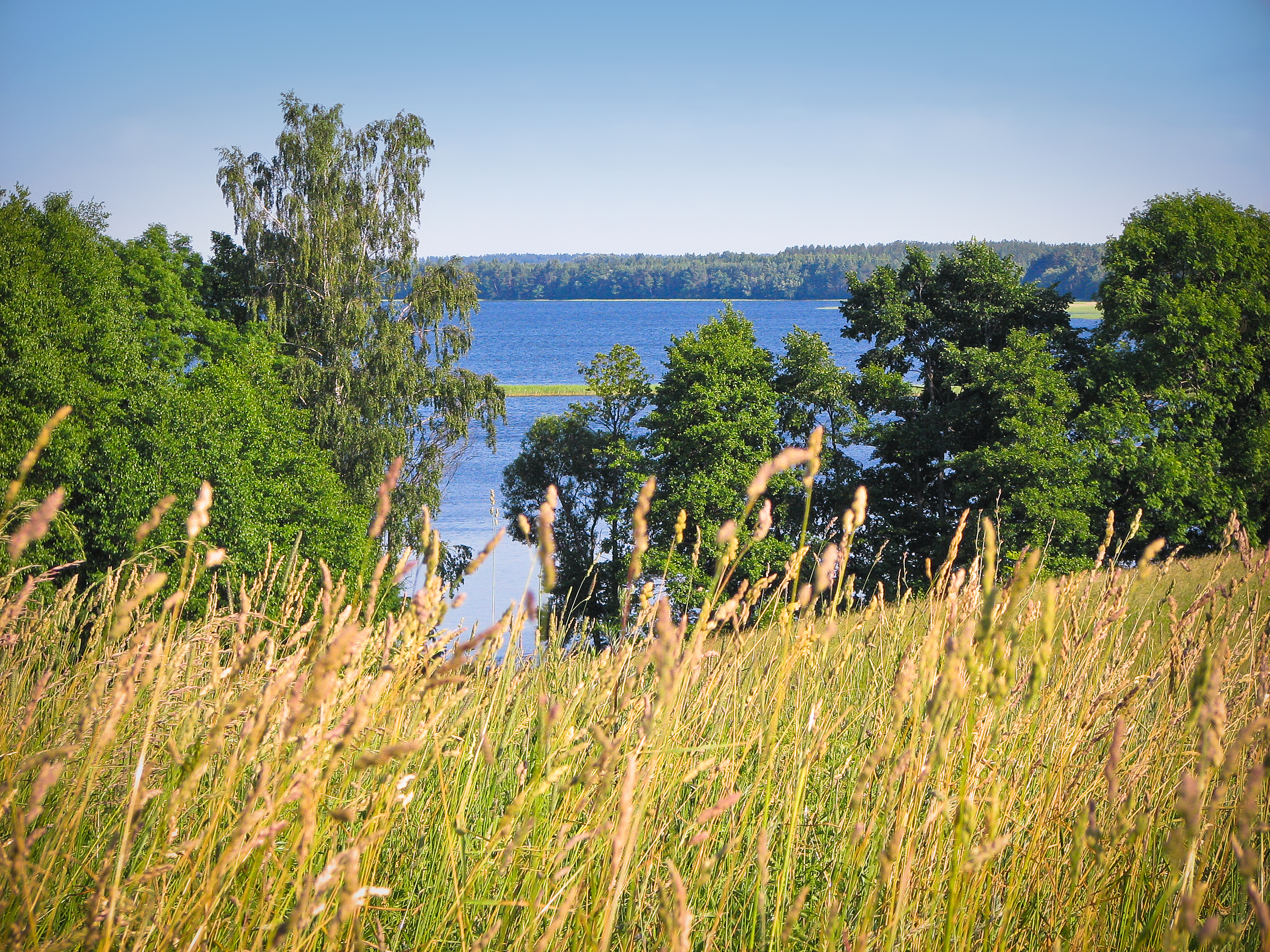
- View to the lake from Latvia side

- Location within Belarus Location within Latvia
- Location: Belarus, Latvia
- Coordinates: 55.698°N 26.711°E
- Lake type: freshwater
- Surface area: 12.8 km^{2} (4.9 sq mi)
- Average depth: 10.2 m (33 ft)
- Max. depth: 51.9 m (170 ft)
- Islands: 5

Lake Rychy (Belarusian: Ры́чы), Richi (Russian: Ричи), or Richu (Latvian: Riču ezers) is a freshwater lake shared by the Braslaw District of Vitebsk Region, Belarus, and Augšdaugava Municipality, Latvia.

The lake is the second-deepest in Belarus and fourth-deepest in Latvia.
