= Soviet destroyer Stremitelny (1937) =

Destroyer of the Soviet Navy

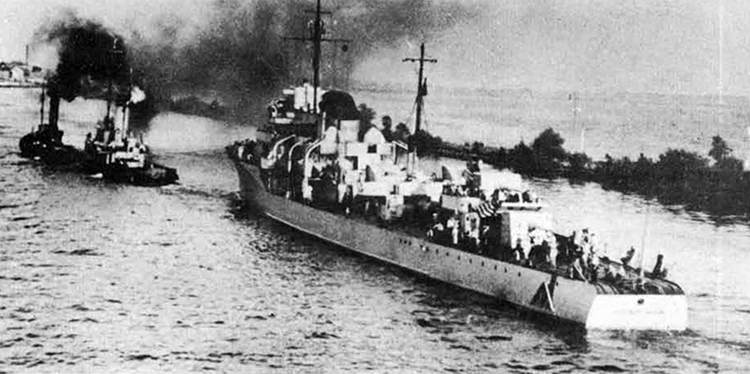
- Stremitelny in harbor

History

Soviet Union
- Name: Stremitelny (Стремительный (Impetuous))
- Ordered: 2nd Five-Year Plan
- Builder: Shipyard No. 189 (Ordzhonikidze), Leningrad
- Laid down: 22 August 1936
- Launched: 4 February 1937
- Completed: 18 November 1938
- Fate: Sunk by aircraft, 20 July 1941

General characteristics (Gnevny as completed, 1938)
- Class & type: Gnevny-class destroyer
- Displacement: 1,612 t (1,587 long tons) (standard)
- Length: 112.8 m (370 ft 1 in) (o/a)
- Beam: 10.2 m (33 ft 6 in)
- Draft: 4.8 m (15 ft 9 in)
- Installed power: 3 water-tube boilers; 48,000 shp (36,000 kW)
- Propulsion: 2 shafts; 2 geared steam turbines
- Speed: 38 knots (70 km/h; 44 mph)
- Range: 2,720 nmi (5,040 km; 3,130 mi) at 19 knots (35 km/h; 22 mph)
- Complement: 197 (236 wartime)
- Sensors & processing systems: Mars hydrophone
- Armament: 4 × single 130 mm (5.1 in) guns; 2 × single 76.2 mm (3 in) AA guns; 2 × single 45 mm (1.8 in) AA guns; 2 × single 12.7 mm (0.50 in) AA machineguns; 2 × triple 533 mm (21 in) torpedo tubes; 60–96 mines; 2 × depth charge racks, 25 depth charges

Stremitelny (Russian: Стремительный, lit. 'Impetuous') was one of 29 Gnevny-class destroyer (officially known as Project 7) built for the Soviet Navy during the late 1930s. Completed in 1938, the ship was assigned to the Baltic Fleet and played a minor role in the 1939–1940 Winter War against Finland. Stremitelny was transferred to the Northern Fleet in mid-1940. After the start of the German invasion of the Soviet Union (Operation Barbarossa) in June 1941, she covered an amphibious landing along the Arctic coast. The ship was attacked and sunk by German dive bombers the following month in Polyarny with the loss of 111 crew and passengers. Her wreck was partially salvaged the following year.

== Design and description ==
Having decided to build the large and expensive 40-knot (74 km/h; 46 mph) Leningrad-class destroyer leaders, the Soviet Navy sought Italian assistance in designing smaller and cheaper destroyers. They licensed the plans for the Folgore class and, in modifying it for their purposes, overloaded a design that was already somewhat marginally stable.

The Gnevnys had an overall length of 112.8 meters (370 ft 1 in), a beam of 10.2 meters (33 ft 6 in), and a draft of 4.8 meters (15 ft 9 in) at deep load. The ships were significantly overweight, almost 200 metric tons (197 long tons) heavier than designed, displacing 1,612 metric tons (1,587 long tons) at standard load and 2,039 metric tons (2,007 long tons) at deep load. Their crew numbered 197 officers and sailors in peacetime and 236 in wartime. The ships had a pair of geared steam turbines, each driving one propeller, rated to produce 48,000 shaft horsepower (36,000 kW) using steam from three water-tube boilers which were intended to give them a maximum speed of 37 knots (69 km/h; 43 mph). The designers had been conservative in rating the turbines and many, but not all, of the ships handily exceeded their designed speed during their sea trials. Others fell considerably short of it. Stremitelny reached 38.3 knots (70.9 km/h; 44.1 mph) during her trials in 1938. Variations in fuel oil capacity meant that the range of the Gnevnys varied between 1,670 to 3,145 nautical miles (3,093 to 5,825 km; 1,922 to 3,619 mi) at 19 knots (35 km/h; 22 mph). Stremitelny herself demonstrated a range of 3,055 nmi (5,658 km; 3,516 mi) at that speed.

As built, the Gnevny-class ships mounted four 130-millimeter (5.1 in) B-13 guns in two pairs of superfiring single mounts fore and aft of the superstructure. Anti-aircraft defense was provided by a pair of 76.2-millimeter (3 in) 34-K AA guns in single mounts and a pair of 45-millimeter (1.8 in) 21-K AA guns as well as two 12.7-millimeter (0.50 in) DK or DShK machine guns. They carried six 533 mm (21 in) torpedo tubes in two rotating triple mounts; each tube was provided with a reload. The ships could also carry a maximum of either 60 or 95 mines and 25 depth charges. They were fitted with a set of Mars hydrophones for anti-submarine work, although they were useless at speeds over 3 knots (5.6 km/h; 3.5 mph). The ships were equipped with two K-1 paravanes intended to destroy mines and a pair of depth-charge throwers.

== Construction and service ==
Built in Leningrad's Shipyard No. 189 (Ordzhonikidze) as yard number 291, Stremitelny was laid down on 22 August 1936 and launched on 4 February 1937. Completed on 18 November 1938, she was commissioned into the Baltic Fleet on 29 November. The ship served on patrol and escort duty during the Winter War, aside from bombarding the coastal artillery positions on the Finnish island of Russarö on 1 December 1939 with her sister ship Smetlivy and the light cruiser Kirov. Stremitelny was transferred to the Northern Fleet on 9 May 1940.

When Operation Barbarossa, the German invasion of the Soviet Union, began on 22 June 1941, the ship was based in Polyarny. Together with her sisters Gromky and Gremyashchy, Stremitelny covered the landing of troops on the western side of the mouth of the Zapadnaya Litsa River on 14 July during Operation Platinum Fox, the German attempt to capture Murmansk. Six days later, she was attacked by Junkers Ju 87 "Stuka" dive bombers while docked in Polyarny and was struck by four bombs amidships. They detonated in the boiler and engine rooms, killing all the crewmen in those compartments and breaking the ship in half. The stern section sank in a few minutes, but the bow section took 20 minutes to sink. A total of 111 people were killed, including several entertainers who were giving a performance aboard when the aircraft attacked. Her wreck was partially salvaged in April 1942 and her stern was used to repair her sister Razumny.

== Sources ==
- Balakin, Sergey (2007). Легендарные "семёрки" Эсминцы "сталинской" серии [Legendary Sevens: Stalin's destroyer series] (in Russian). Moscow: Yauza/Eksmo. ISBN 978-5-699-23784-5.
- Berezhnoy, Sergey (2002). Крейсера и миноносцы. Справочник [Guide to Cruisers and Destroyers] (in Russian). Moscow: Voenizdat. ISBN 5-203-01780-8.
- Budzbon, Przemysaw (1980). "Soviet Union". In Chesneau, Roger (ed.). Conway's All the World's Fighting Ships 1922–1946. Greenwich, UK: Conway Maritime Press. pp. 318–346. ISBN 0-85177-146-7.
- Hill, Alexander (2018). Soviet Destroyers of World War II. New Vanguard. Vol. 256. Oxford, UK: Osprey Publishing. ISBN 978-1-4728-2256-7.
- Platonov, Andrey V. (2002). Энциклопедия советских надводных кораблей 1941–1945 [Encyclopedia of Soviet Surface Ships 1941–1945] (in Russian). Saint Petersburg: Poligon. ISBN 5-89173-178-9.
- Rohwer, Jürgen (2005). Chronology of the War at Sea 1939–1945: The Naval History of World War Two (Third Revised ed.). Annapolis, Maryland: Naval Institute Press. ISBN 1-59114-119-2.
- Rohwer, Jürgen & Monakov, Mikhail S. (2001). Stalin's Ocean-Going Fleet. London: Frank Cass. ISBN 0-7146-4895-7.
- Yakubov, Vladimir & Worth, Richard (2008). "The Soviet Project 7/7U Destroyers". In Jordan, John & Dent, Stephen (eds.). Warship 2008. London: Conway. pp. 99–114. ISBN 978-1-84486-062-3.
