= Lake Sivers =

Lake in Latvia

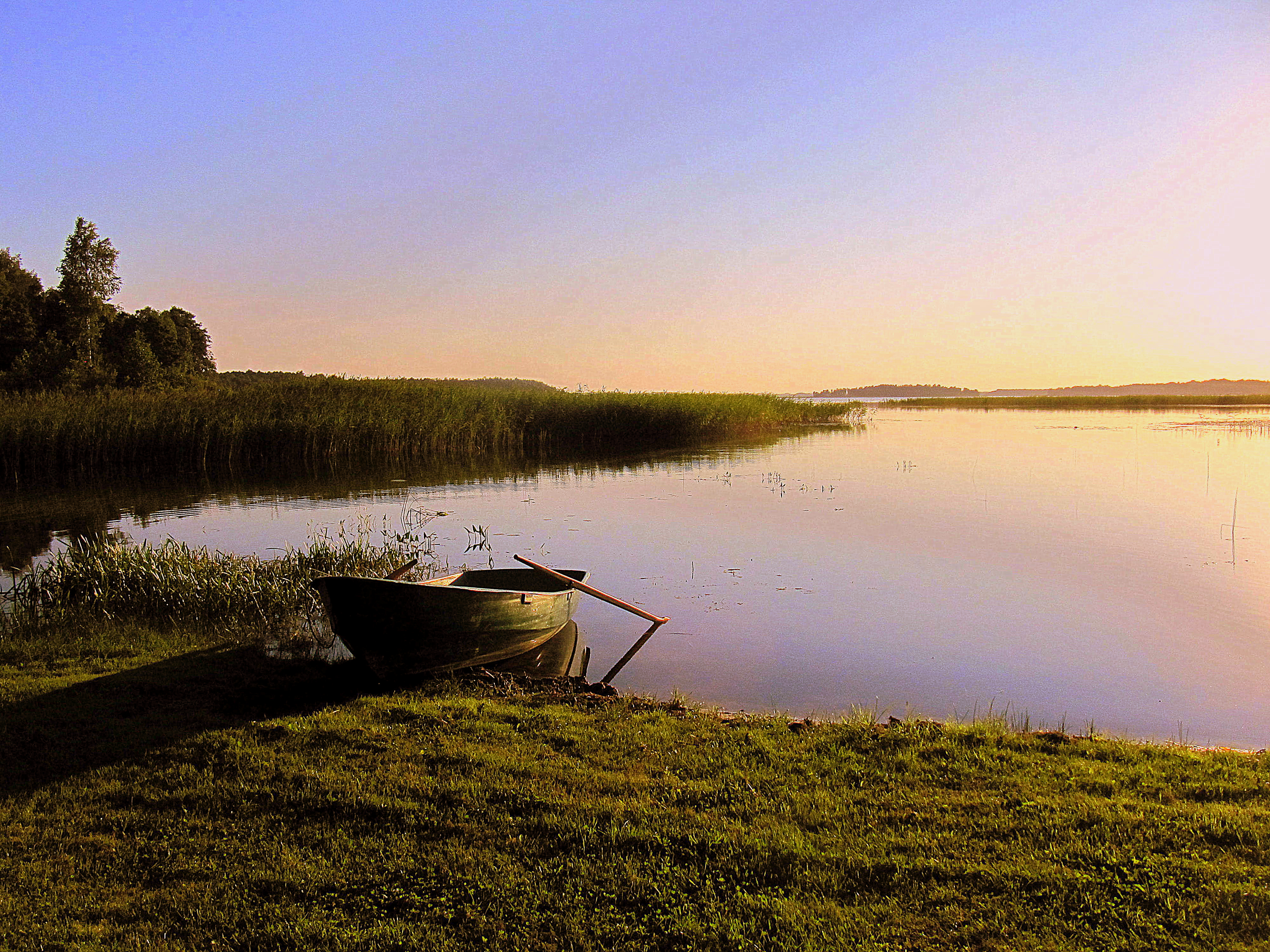

- Location within Latvia
- Location: Krāslava Municipality, Latvia
- Coordinates: 56°1′N 27°20′E
- Surface area: 17.59 km^{2} (6.79 sq mi)
- Average depth: 6.3 m (21 ft)
- Max. depth: 24.5 m (80 ft)
- Surface elevation: 159.4 m (523 ft)
- Islands: 20 (53 ha)

Lake Sivers is a lake in Latvia located in the Krāslava Municipality, has a maximal depth of 24.5 m. At an elevation of 159.4 m, its surface area is 1759 ha (1812 ha with islands).
