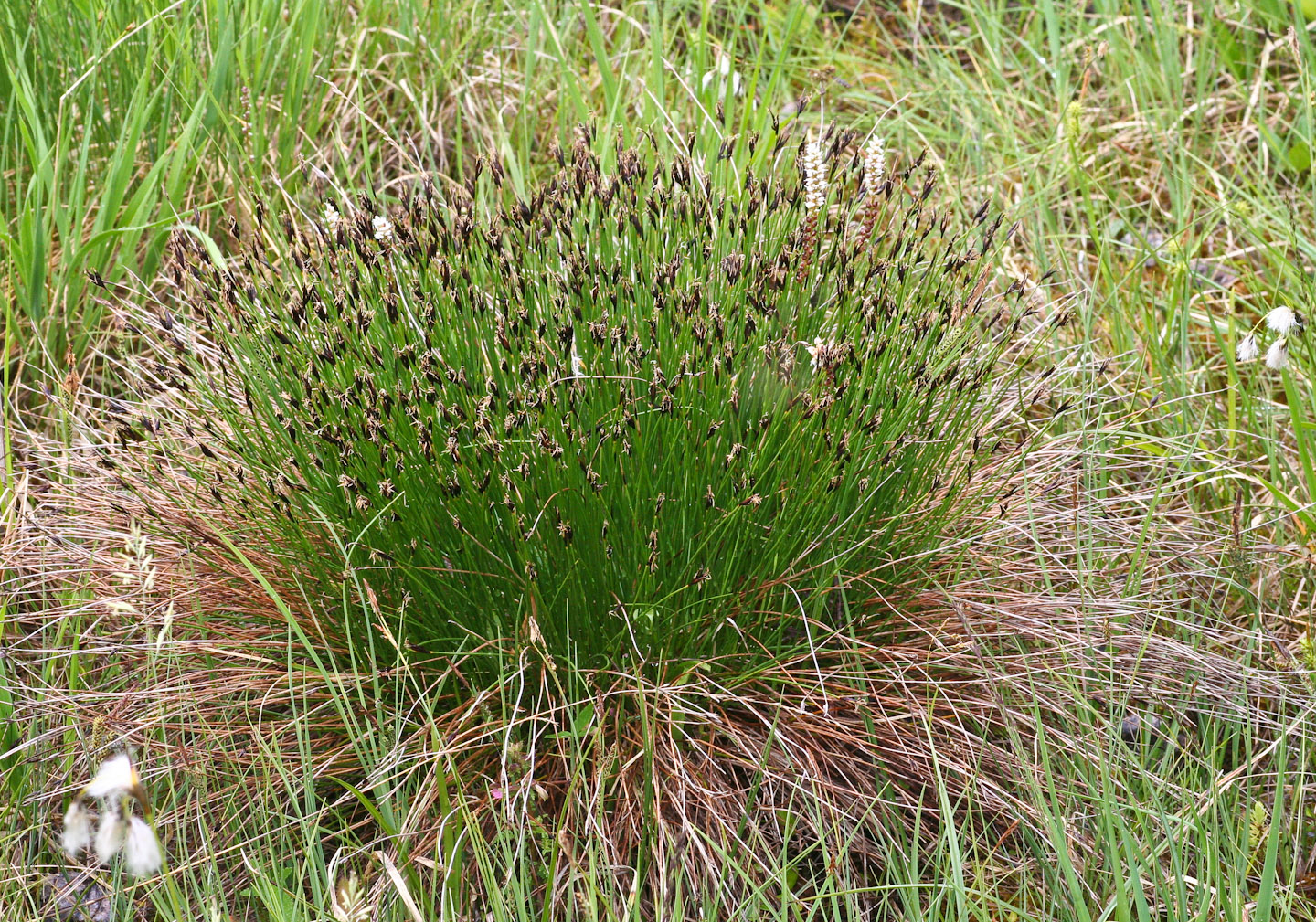

Scientific classification
- Kingdom: Plantae
- Clade: Tracheophytes
- Clade: Angiosperms
- Clade: Monocots
- Clade: Commelinids
- Order: Poales
- Family: Cyperaceae
- Genus: Schoenus
- Species: S. ferrugineus

Binomial name
- Schoenus ferrugineus L.

= Schoenus ferrugineus =

Brown bog-rush

Species of grass-like plant

Schoenus ferrugineus is a species of flowering plant belonging to the family Cyperaceae.

It is native to Europe.
