= Lake Pape =

Lake in Latvia

- Papes ezers (Latvian)
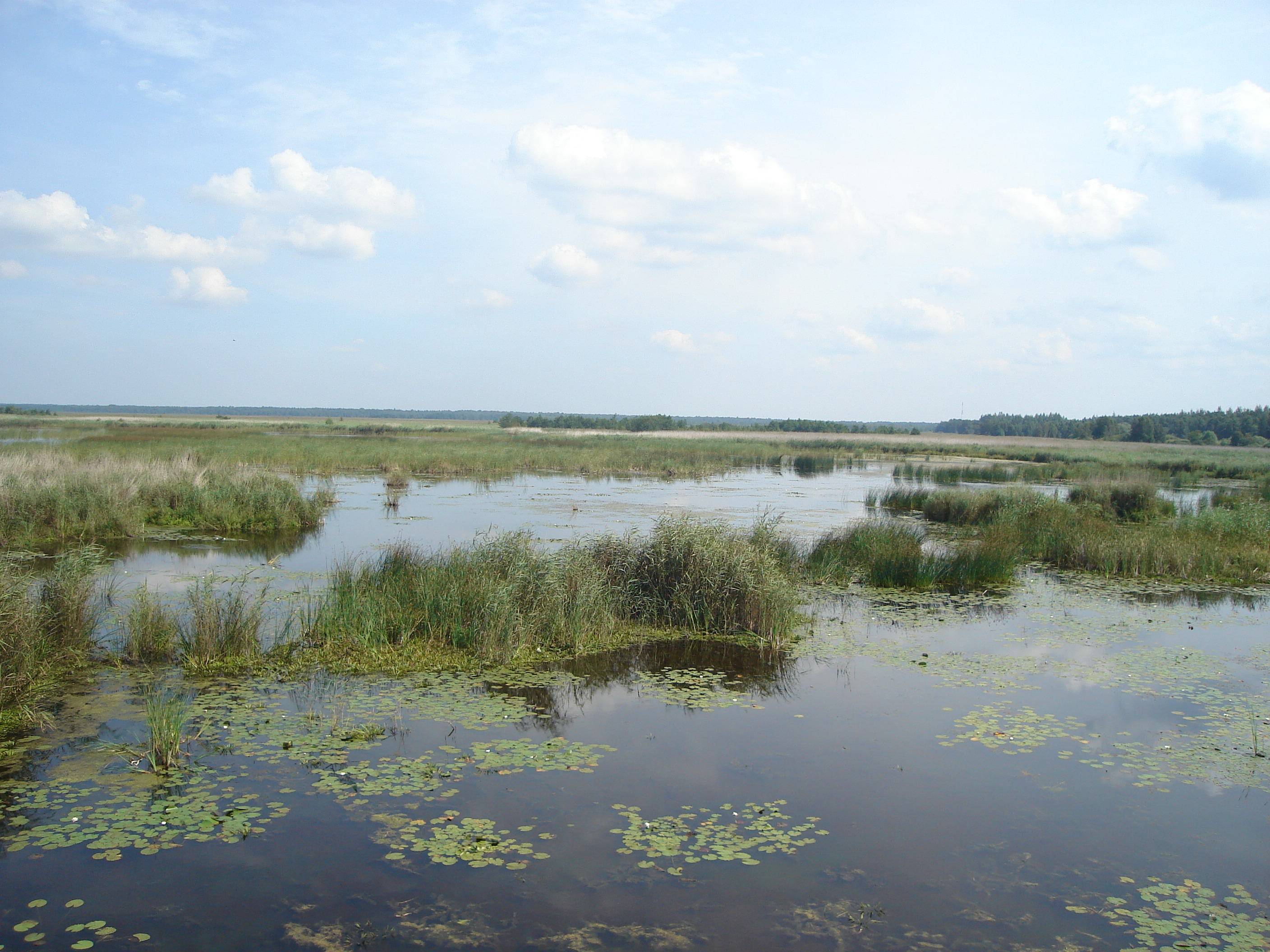
- Lake Pape

- Location within Latvia
- Location: Latvia
- Coordinates: 56°12′N 21°03′E
- Type: lake
- Primary outflows: Pape lake channel
- Basin countries: Latvia
- Max. length: 8.4 kilometres (5.2 mi)
- Surface area: 12.5 square kilometres (4.8 sq mi)
- Average depth: 0.5 metres (1 ft 8 in)
- Max. depth: 1.1 meters (3 ft 7 in)
- Islands: 12

Lake Pape (Latvian: Papes ezers) is a mesotrophic lagoon lake on the western coast of Latvia. It is located in the Pape Nature Reserve about 15 kilometres (9.3 mi) south of Liepāja. The lake is 8.3 kilometres (5.2 mi) long, with a width of 2.8 kilometres (1.7 mi) and a shoreline of 40.4 kilometres (25.1 mi). The bed of the lake is wide and shallow - the deepest point is about 2m but on average it is only half a metre deep. The deepest parts are found in the east part of the lake, opposite to Kalnišķi and Brušviti and the mouth of the Līgupe River into the lake.

== Biodiversity ==
=== Birds ===
Several protected bird species nest at the lake: the Aquatic Warbler, which is listed in Appendix I of the EU birds Directive and is of vulnerable conservation status, the Little Crake, the Eurasian Bittern and the Marsh Harrier. Other birds which nest at the lake include the Savi’s Warbler and the Bearded Reedling. The lake is a major gathering place for migrating birds moving along the White Sea to Baltic Sea migration route, with over 200 different bird species migrating across the lake and the shoreline each year. For example, migrating geese gather on the lake in the hundreds along with migrating cranes.

=== Sea life ===
Along with saltwater, many fish species move from the Baltic sea into the lake such as sea trout, eels and Salmon.

=== Flora ===
The habitat around the lake is protected by both Latvia and The European Union due to the calcareous soil, which allows plants such as the Great Fen-sedge, a rare species in Europe, to grow.
