= Port of Hanko =

Seaport in Finland

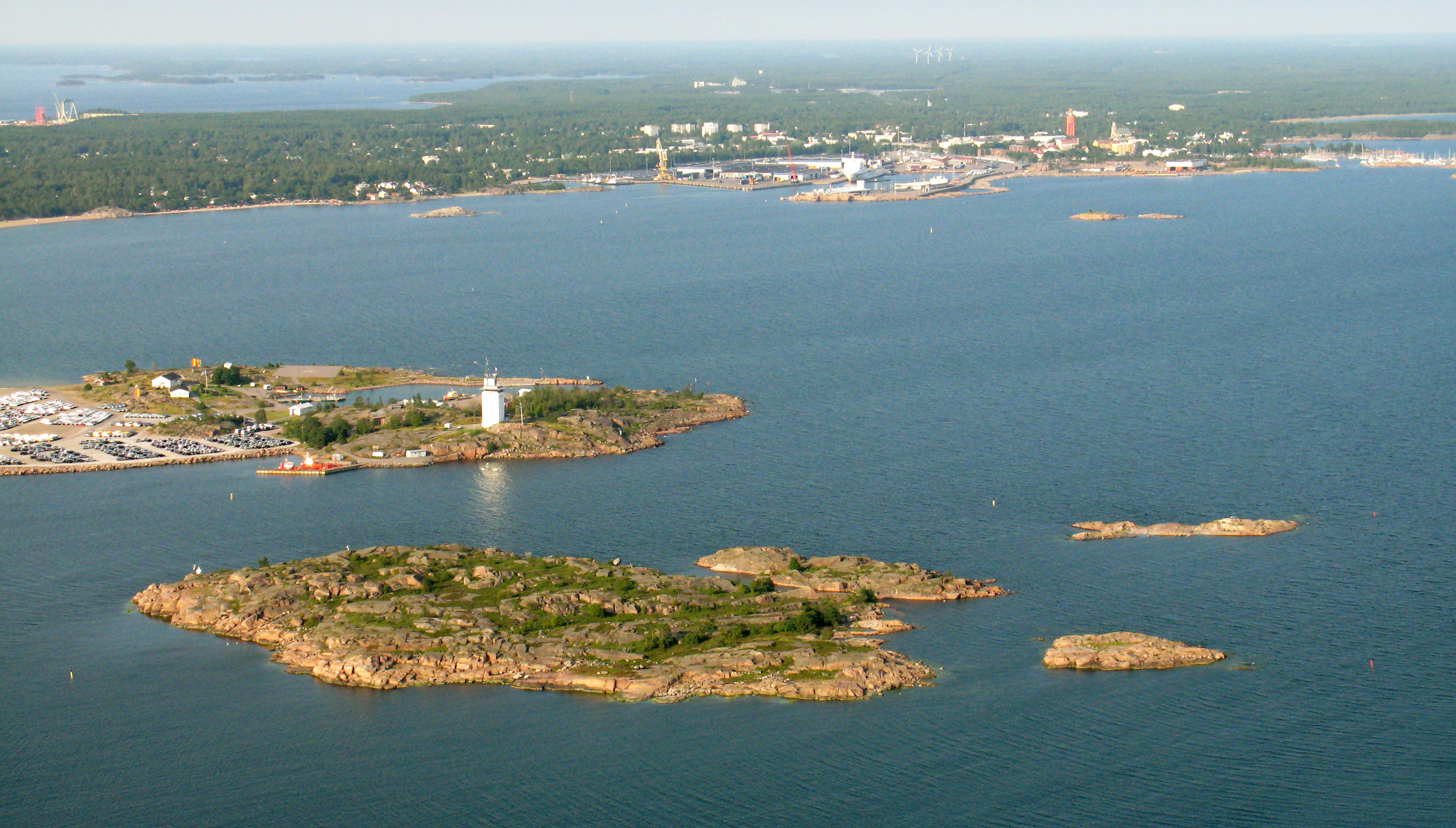
- Port of Hanko: Western harbour in the background, Outer harbour partly visible on the left
- Click on the map for a fullscreen view
- Port of Hanko (Finland)
- Native name: Hangon satama – Hangö hamn

Location
- Country: Finland
- Location: Hanko
- Coordinates: 59.822151°N 22.955747°E
- UN/LOCODE: FI HKO

Details
- Opened: 1872
- Operated by: Oy Hangon Satama – Hangö Hamn Ab
- Owned by: City of Hanko
- Type of harbour: coastal breakwater
- Draft depth: max. 14.0 metres (45.9 ft) depth

Statistics
- Annual cargo tonnage: c. 4.8m tons (int'l) (2018)
- Website https://portofhanko.fi/en/

The Port of Hanko is a cargo port in the city of Hanko, on the south coast of Finland. Situated almost at the tip of the Hanko Peninsula, it is the southernmost of all Finnish ports.

== Harbours ==
The port comprises three areas:

- Western harbour: 5 RO-RO quays; depth 8.6–14.0 metres (28.2–45.9 ft)
- Outer harbour: mostly used to import and store vehicles in free-trade zone facility; 2 quays; total length 366 metres (1,201 ft), depth 7.8–10.5 metres (26–34 ft); also includes over 620,000 square metres (6,700,000 sq ft) storage area
- Koverhar harbour: focusing on bulk cargo; 2 quays; total length 367 metres (1,204 ft), depth 9.0–11.0 metres (29.5–36.1 ft); also includes c. 600 hectares (1,500 acres) of storage area

== Traffic ==
With total annual international cargo throughput of 4.8 million tons in 2018, Hanko is the 6th biggest port in Finland by cargo tonnage. The total volume is fairly evenly split between exports and imports.

The Port of Hanko specialises in fast cargo liner traffic, with the major operators including Transfennica, Finnlines and DFDS. Among the main categories of import cargo are cars and other vehicles, while exports consist largely of products of the forestry and paper industries.

Up to and including 2006, Hanko also handled passenger traffic, but this has since all but stopped.

== See also ==
- Russarö Lighthouse
