= Lake Rāzna =

Lake in Rēzekne Municipality, Latvia

- Rāznas ezers (Latvian)
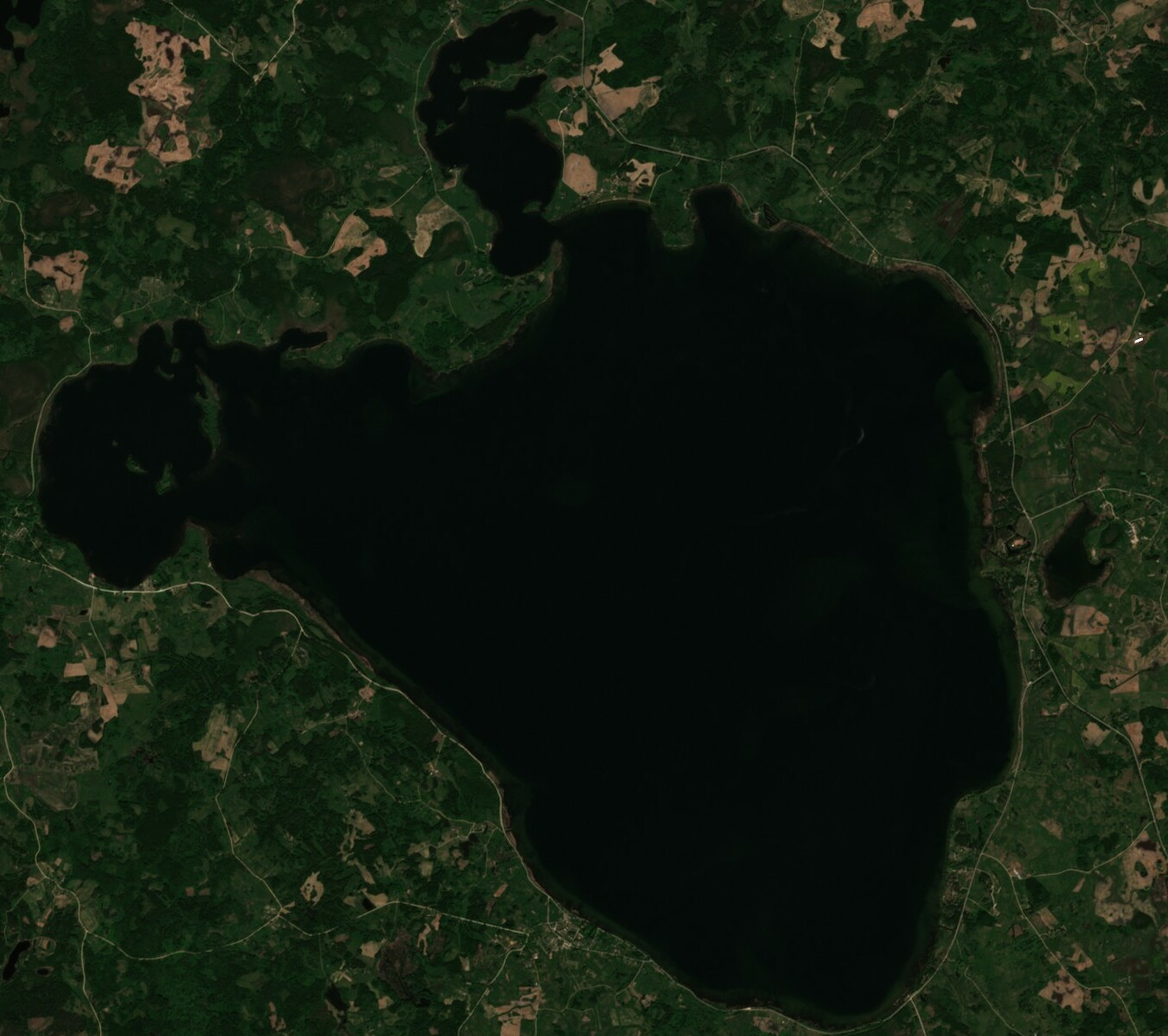
- A satellite image of the lake

- Location within Latvia
- Coordinates: 56.316667°N 27.45°E
- Lake type: Lake
- Primary inflows: Rezekne
- Catchment area: 229 square kilometres (88 sq mi)
- Basin countries: Latvia
- Surface area: 57.81 square kilometres (22.32 sq mi)
- Average depth: 7 metres (23 ft)
- Max. depth: 17 metres (56 ft)
- Water volume: 0.405 cubic kilometres (0.097 cu mi)
- Surface elevation: 163.3 metres (536 ft)
- Islands: 10

Rāzna (Latvian: Rāznas ezers, Rēznas ezers) is the second largest water surface and the first in terms of water volume lake in Latvia. It is located in the eastern part of the country on the territory of Rēzekne Municipality, the water area of the lake is divided between Kaunatas, Mākoņkalna and Čornajas parishes.

It is located in the central part of the Latgale Upland at an altitude of 163.3 m (536 ft) above sea level. The total area of the lake is 57.81 km^{2} (22.32 sq mi), the water surface is 57.564 km^{2} (22.226 sq mi). The maximum depth reaches 17 m (56 ft). There are 10 islands on the lake with a total area of 24.6 hectares (61 acres), the largest of them is Apshu (9 hectares). In the late 80s - early 90s, the Committee for Environmental Protection drew attention to the deterioration of the ecological state of the lake. In 1999, funds were allocated for a project to create a nature park based on the lake. In 2001, local governments signed a protocol proposing the creation of the Rāzna National Park. In 2004, the official establishment of the Razna Natural Park took place, and on January 1, 2007 was transformed into the Rāzna National Park.

The lake is home to northern pike, stickleback, stone loach, european eel, tench, sander, perch, roach, peled, carp, crucian carp, common bleak, common bream, common rudd, vendace, ide, ruff, blicca bjoerkna and some other fish species.

Two kilometers from the south-western shore of the lake there is Makonkalns hill, from which a view of the lake can be seen.
