= Mērsrags =

Town in Latvia

Coordinates: 57°20′N 23°07′E

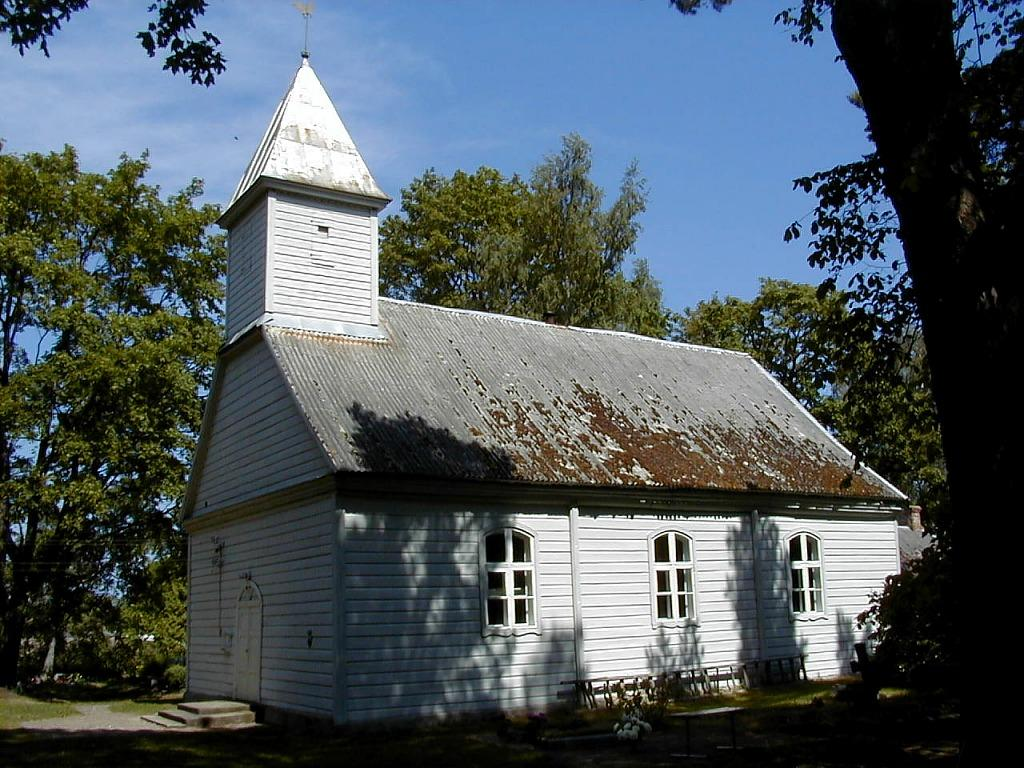
Wooden Lutheran church in Mērsrags

Mērsrags (German: Markgrafen) is a small harbor town in Talsi Municipality in the Courland region of Latvia, located on the west coast of the Gulf of Riga beside Lake Engure and surrounded by extensive woodlands. The total area of the former Mērsrags municipality was 109 km^{2} (10896.2 ha), 63.7% of this area was woodland and Lake Engure covered 20.4%, the coastline was about 12 km long. The town center is some 42 km from Talsi, the main city of the area and some 95 km from the capital, Riga.

Mērsrags had a population of 1986 in June 2008.

Many types of landscape can be seen; seaside, lake reservation, everglades, lagoons, the bed of the dried-up Litorīnas lake (Litorīnas ezers), the sand dune forest, and rural and urban landscapes.

== History ==
The earliest information about Mērsrags is from the 15th century, when it was a small fishing hamlet beside the Gulf of Riga. There are many stories and myths about Mērsrags. Pirates, who lured ships ashore and plundered them, used to live here. During the ducal period, there was a large production of soap.

In 1842 a canal was dug from the north end of Lake Engure to the sea and in 1843 Mērsrags began to develop. In 1880 a lighthouse had been completed and the first ship was launched from the dockyard. Altogether 22 sailing ships were built in Mērsrags. Between 1860 and 1915, 66 sailing ships were built in Upesgrīva village.

Until 1918, Mērsrags village and Upesgrīva village belonged to the parish of the Engure manor but, in 1918, Mērsrags became a separate parish. Likewise in 1926 Upesgrīva became a separate parish.

In 1926 a narrow-gauge railway came to Mērsrags and in 1927 the port was built to satisfy the needs of fishing boats and shipping.

In the 1960s the development of the fish farm collective resulted in a great increase in the production of fish and canned products. The first block of flats and a distant steam heating plant were built. A new fish processing plant was constructed as well as a net repair shop and an engineering workshop. The village roads were repaired and asphalted. Fishing remains an important aspect of the economy, with smoked fish being one of the local specialties.

== Sights and attractions ==
The area has a developed infrastructure for tourism, especially for anglers and birdwatchers.

- Lake Engure, an important stopping place for migratory birds, attracts many birdwatchers and Mērsrags is an excellent place to observe wading birds. The village offers access to the lake's northern shore, where a birdwatching tower is located about 5 km from the town.
- The Mērsrags canal (dug in 1842-1843) is about 4 km. long and connects Lake Engure to the sea.
- Museum - The Peoples House (Saieta Names - latv.). The building is from 1872 and contains an exhibition about life and conditions in Mērsrags and its surroundings at the beginning of the 20th century. There are many relics, tools and items from the houses of the period.
- Mērsrags lighthouse, built in 1874.
- Mērsrags Lutheran Church, built in 1809, is one of the oldest wooden churches in the country.

The church contains several preserved cultural monuments. Located in the old churchyard.

== Climate ==
Mērsrags has a humid continental climate (Köppen Dfb) closely bordering on an oceanic climate (Köppen Cfb).

Climate data for Mērsrags (1991-2020 normals, extremes 1895-present)
Month	Jan	Feb	Mar	Apr	May	Jun	Jul	Aug	Sep	Oct	Nov	Dec	Year
Record high °C (°F)	10.7 (51.3)	13.6 (56.5)	20.8 (69.4)	28.1 (82.6)	31.6 (88.9)	34.6 (94.3)	34.4 (93.9)	33.8 (92.8)	29.1 (84.4)	24.9 (76.8)	15.5 (59.9)	12.4 (54.3)	34.6 (94.3)
Mean daily maximum °C (°F)	0.5 (32.9)	0.5 (32.9)	4.1 (39.4)	9.8 (49.6)	15.4 (59.7)	19.6 (67.3)	22.3 (72.1)	21.6 (70.9)	17.0 (62.6)	10.6 (51.1)	5.3 (41.5)	2.0 (35.6)	10.7 (51.3)
Daily mean °C (°F)	−1.6 (29.1)	−2.1 (28.2)	0.5 (32.9)	5.2 (41.4)	10.5 (50.9)	14.8 (58.6)	17.6 (63.7)	17.0 (62.6)	12.7 (54.9)	7.4 (45.3)	3.2 (37.8)	0.0 (32.0)	7.1 (44.8)
Mean daily minimum °C (°F)	−4.3 (24.3)	−5.1 (22.8)	−3.3 (26.1)	0.5 (32.9)	4.8 (40.6)	9.3 (48.7)	12.2 (54.0)	11.7 (53.1)	8.1 (46.6)	3.9 (39.0)	0.8 (33.4)	−2.4 (27.7)	3.0 (37.4)
Record low °C (°F)	−33.7 (−28.7)	−36.2 (−33.2)	−28.9 (−20.0)	−16.2 (2.8)	−6.1 (21.0)	−2.2 (28.0)	3.3 (37.9)	1.4 (34.5)	−3.9 (25.0)	−10.0 (14.0)	−18.1 (−0.6)	−25.6 (−14.1)	−36.2 (−33.2)
Average precipitation mm (inches)	42.9 (1.69)	33.8 (1.33)	31.6 (1.24)	35.1 (1.38)	45.4 (1.79)	66.5 (2.62)	77.3 (3.04)	75.5 (2.97)	53.5 (2.11)	67.4 (2.65)	52.4 (2.06)	44.6 (1.76)	626 (24.64)
Average precipitation days (≥ 1 mm)	10	8	7	7	8	9	9	10	9	12	11	11	111
Average relative humidity (%)	86.2	84.4	79.8	76.0	73.6	75.5	77.6	79.3	81.5	83.6	87.2	87.5	81.0
Source 1: LVĢMC
Source 2: NOAA (precipitation days, humidity 1991-2020)

Coastal temperature data for Mērsrags
Month	Jan	Feb	Mar	Apr	May	Jun	Jul	Aug	Sep	Oct	Nov	Dec	Year
Average sea temperature °C (°F)	1.9 (35.42)	1.0 (33.80)	1.1 (33.98)	2.9 (37.22)	7.8 (46.04)	13.9 (57.02)	18.7 (65.66)	18.7 (65.66)	15.6 (60.08)	11.8 (53.24)	8.6 (47.48)	5.3 (41.54)	8.9 (48.09)
Source 1: Seatemperature.net
