= Hanko, Finland =

Finnish municipality and town in Raseborg sub-region, Uusimaa

Hanko Hanko – Hangö
- Municipality and town
- Hangon kaupunki Hangö stad
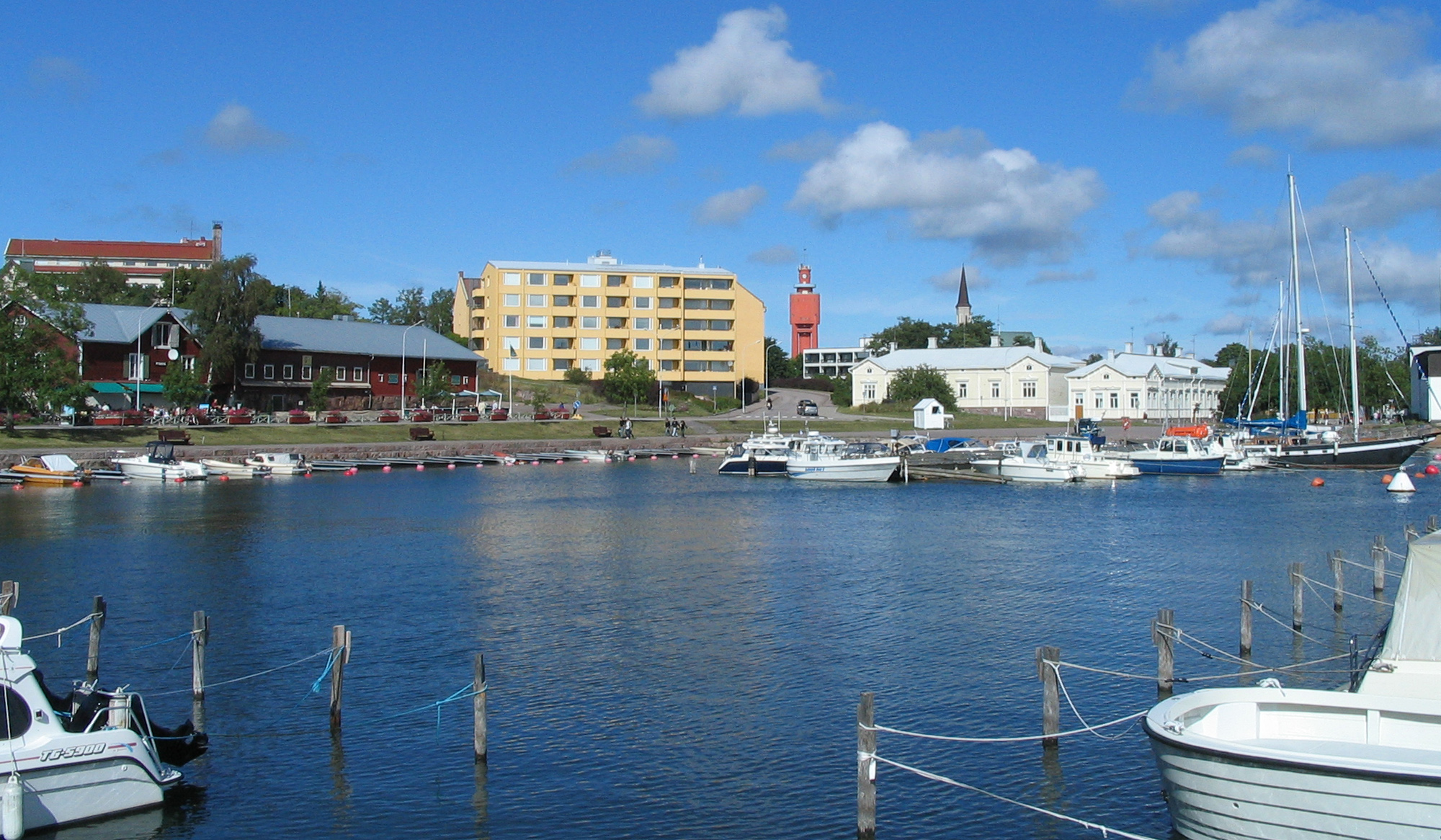
- Eastern Harbour coastline

- Coat of arms
- Nickname: The Riviera of Finland
- Location of Hanko in Finland
- Interactive map of Hanko
- Coordinates: 59°49′42″N 22°57′57″E
- Country: Finland
- Region: Uusimaa
- Sub-region: Raseborg
- Charter: 1874

Government
  - Town manager: Simon Store

Area (2018-01-01)
  - Total: 799.99 km^{2} (308.88 sq mi)
  - Land: 117.44 km^{2} (45.34 sq mi)
  - Water: 683.26 km^{2} (263.81 sq mi)
  - Rank: 292nd largest in Finland

Population (2025-12-31)
  - Total: 7,620
  - Rank: 121st largest in Finland
  - Density: 64.88/km^{2} (168.0/sq mi)

Population by native language
  - Finnish: 52% (official)
  - Swedish: 41.2% (official)
  - Others: 6.8%

Population by age
  - 0 to 14: 11.9%
  - 15 to 64: 55.1%
  - 65 or older: 33%
- Time zone: UTC+02:00 (EET)
  - Summer (DST): UTC+03:00 (EEST)
- Climate: Dfb
- Website: hanko.fi

Hanko (Finnish pronunciation: [ˈhɑŋko]; Swedish: Hangö) is a town in Finland, located in the southern coast of the country. Hanko is situated in the western part of the Uusimaa region. The population of Hanko is approximately 8,000. It is the 121st most populous municipality in Finland.

Hanko is located 130 kilometres (80 mi) west of Helsinki and 35 kilometres (22 mi) south-west of Ekenäs.

The Port of Hanko is today the 4th largest port in Finland. The skyline of Hanko is dominated by the church and the water tower. Both of them received their current appearance after World War II, as their predecessors were either damaged or destroyed by the Soviet Armed Forces.

Hanko is a bilingual municipality with Finnish and Swedish as its official languages. The population consists of 52% Finnish speakers, 41% Swedish speakers, and 7% speakers of other languages.

== Geography ==
The Hanko Peninsula, on which the town is located, is the southernmost tip of continental Finland. The soil is a sandy moraine, and vegetation consists mainly of pine and low shrubs, mostly Calluna. Hanko is known for its beautiful archipelago.

The town has a coastline of approximately 130 km (80 mi), of which 30 km (20 mi) are sandy beaches. There are also over 90 small islands and islets within the city limits.

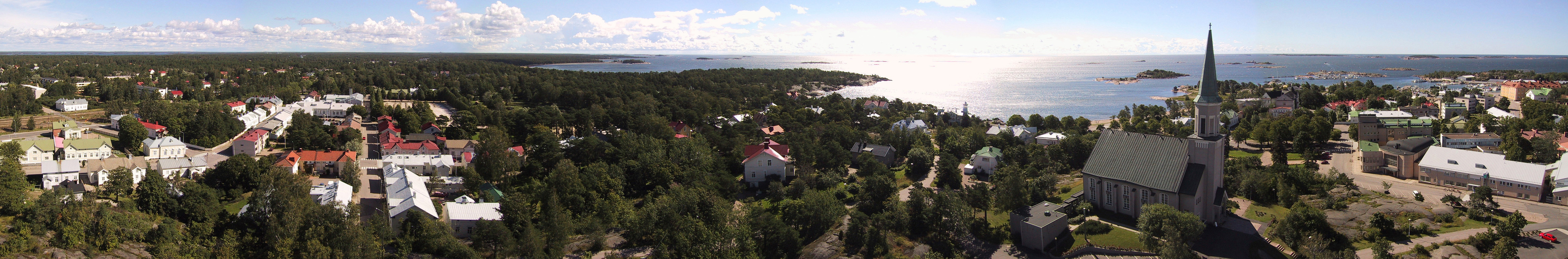
A scrollable panorama shot from the water tower shows the typical small-town architecture, with mostly wooden buildings. Some of the archipelago is also visible. The view is, left to right, from east to southwest. The photo was taken at noon, so the sun is due south.

=== Climate ===
Hanko has a humid continental climate (Köppen Dfb), which is significantly milder in terms of temperatures than the average of the same latitude. Compared to, for example, Helsinki, Hanko's climate is more oceanic on average, which means milder in winter and cooler in summer. The moderating influence of Baltic Sea cyclones results in warm and moderately humid summers and long, moderately cold wet winters. The period with the most precipitation is in autumn and early winter. The driest months are April and May. Duration of sunshine varies greatly throughout the year, being high in summer due to both long days and relatively clear weather, and low in late autumn and early winter due to both short days and high number of cloudy days. Thunderstorms occur most in the summer months.

Climate data for Hanko Tvärminne 1991–2020 normals, records 1963–present
| Month | Jan | Feb | Mar | Apr | May | Jun | Jul | Aug | Sep | Oct | Nov | Dec | Year |
|---|---|---|---|---|---|---|---|---|---|---|---|---|---|
| Record high °C (°F) | 8.0 (46.4) | 9.1 (48.4) | 14.4 (57.9) | 19.7 (67.5) | 25.6 (78.1) | 30.9 (87.6) | 31.1 (88.0) | 30.3 (86.5) | 23.6 (74.5) | 17.6 (63.7) | 14.4 (57.9) | 9.5 (49.1) | 31.1 (88.0) |
| Mean maximum °C (°F) | 4.6 (40.3) | 4.3 (39.7) | 7.5 (45.5) | 14.3 (57.7) | 21.0 (69.8) | 23.8 (74.8) | 26.2 (79.2) | 24.6 (76.3) | 19.6 (67.3) | 14.1 (57.4) | 9.4 (48.9) | 6.2 (43.2) | 27.1 (80.8) |
| Mean daily maximum °C (°F) | 0.0 (32.0) | −0.8 (30.6) | 2.0 (35.6) | 6.8 (44.2) | 13.1 (55.6) | 17.6 (63.7) | 21.0 (69.8) | 20.0 (68.0) | 15.2 (59.4) | 9.4 (48.9) | 5.0 (41.0) | 2.2 (36.0) | 9.3 (48.7) |
| Daily mean °C (°F) | −2.2 (28.0) | −3.2 (26.2) | −0.8 (30.6) | 3.6 (38.5) | 9.2 (48.6) | 13.9 (57.0) | 17.5 (63.5) | 16.8 (62.2) | 12.6 (54.7) | 7.3 (45.1) | 3.2 (37.8) | 0.3 (32.5) | 6.5 (43.7) |
| Mean daily minimum °C (°F) | −4.5 (23.9) | −5.7 (21.7) | −3.5 (25.7) | 0.8 (33.4) | 5.8 (42.4) | 10.6 (51.1) | 14.3 (57.7) | 13.9 (57.0) | 10.0 (50.0) | 5.1 (41.2) | 1.3 (34.3) | −1.9 (28.6) | 3.9 (38.9) |
| Mean minimum °C (°F) | −15.3 (4.5) | −15.4 (4.3) | −11.8 (10.8) | −4.0 (24.8) | 0.4 (32.7) | 5.9 (42.6) | 10.0 (50.0) | 9.2 (48.6) | 4.1 (39.4) | −2.0 (28.4) | −5.6 (21.9) | −10.5 (13.1) | −18.5 (−1.3) |
| Record low °C (°F) | −33.9 (−29.0) | −35.2 (−31.4) | −22.8 (−9.0) | −16 (3) | −3.4 (25.9) | 2.5 (36.5) | 4.6 (40.3) | 4.5 (40.1) | −2.4 (27.7) | −9.2 (15.4) | −14.9 (5.2) | −31.3 (−24.3) | −35.2 (−31.4) |
| Average precipitation mm (inches) | 55 (2.2) | 36 (1.4) | 39 (1.5) | 30 (1.2) | 35 (1.4) | 45 (1.8) | 51 (2.0) | 79 (3.1) | 55 (2.2) | 75 (3.0) | 72 (2.8) | 62 (2.4) | 634 (25.0) |
| Average rainy days (≥ 0.1 mm) | 18 | 14 | 14 | 11 | 10 | 11 | 11 | 14 | 14 | 17 | 17 | 18 | 169 |
Source 1: FMI climatological normals for Finland 1991–2020
Source 2: record highs and lows

Climate data for Hanko Tulliniemi (1991–2020 normals, extremes 1993–present)
| Month | Jan | Feb | Mar | Apr | May | Jun | Jul | Aug | Sep | Oct | Nov | Dec | Year |
|---|---|---|---|---|---|---|---|---|---|---|---|---|---|
| Record high °C (°F) | 7.6 (45.7) | 8.4 (47.1) | 11.4 (52.5) | 18.1 (64.6) | 24.6 (76.3) | 27.9 (82.2) | 28.9 (84.0) | 27.6 (81.7) | 22.5 (72.5) | 16.5 (61.7) | 12.9 (55.2) | 8.9 (48.0) | 28.9 (84.0) |
| Mean daily maximum °C (°F) | 0.1 (32.2) | −0.9 (30.4) | 1.3 (34.3) | 5.9 (42.6) | 11.5 (52.7) | 16.2 (61.2) | 20.1 (68.2) | 19.5 (67.1) | 15.1 (59.2) | 9.7 (49.5) | 5.4 (41.7) | 2.4 (36.3) | 8.9 (48.0) |
| Daily mean °C (°F) | −1.5 (29.3) | −2.7 (27.1) | −0.5 (31.1) | 3.3 (37.9) | 8.5 (47.3) | 13.5 (56.3) | 17.4 (63.3) | 17.2 (63.0) | 13.2 (55.8) | 8.0 (46.4) | 3.8 (38.8) | 1.0 (33.8) | 6.8 (44.2) |
| Mean daily minimum °C (°F) | −3.9 (25.0) | −4.9 (23.2) | −3.0 (26.6) | 1.3 (34.3) | 6.2 (43.2) | 11.5 (52.7) | 15.4 (59.7) | 15.3 (59.5) | 11.4 (52.5) | 6.4 (43.5) | 2.2 (36.0) | −1.1 (30.0) | 4.7 (40.5) |
| Record low °C (°F) | −25.4 (−13.7) | −22.7 (−8.9) | −17.2 (1.0) | −8.9 (16.0) | −1.4 (29.5) | 4.8 (40.6) | 9.9 (49.8) | 7.9 (46.2) | 2.8 (37.0) | −5.0 (23.0) | −13.1 (8.4) | −22.3 (−8.1) | −25.4 (−13.7) |
Source 1: FMI normals 1991-2020
Source 2: Record highs and lows

== History ==
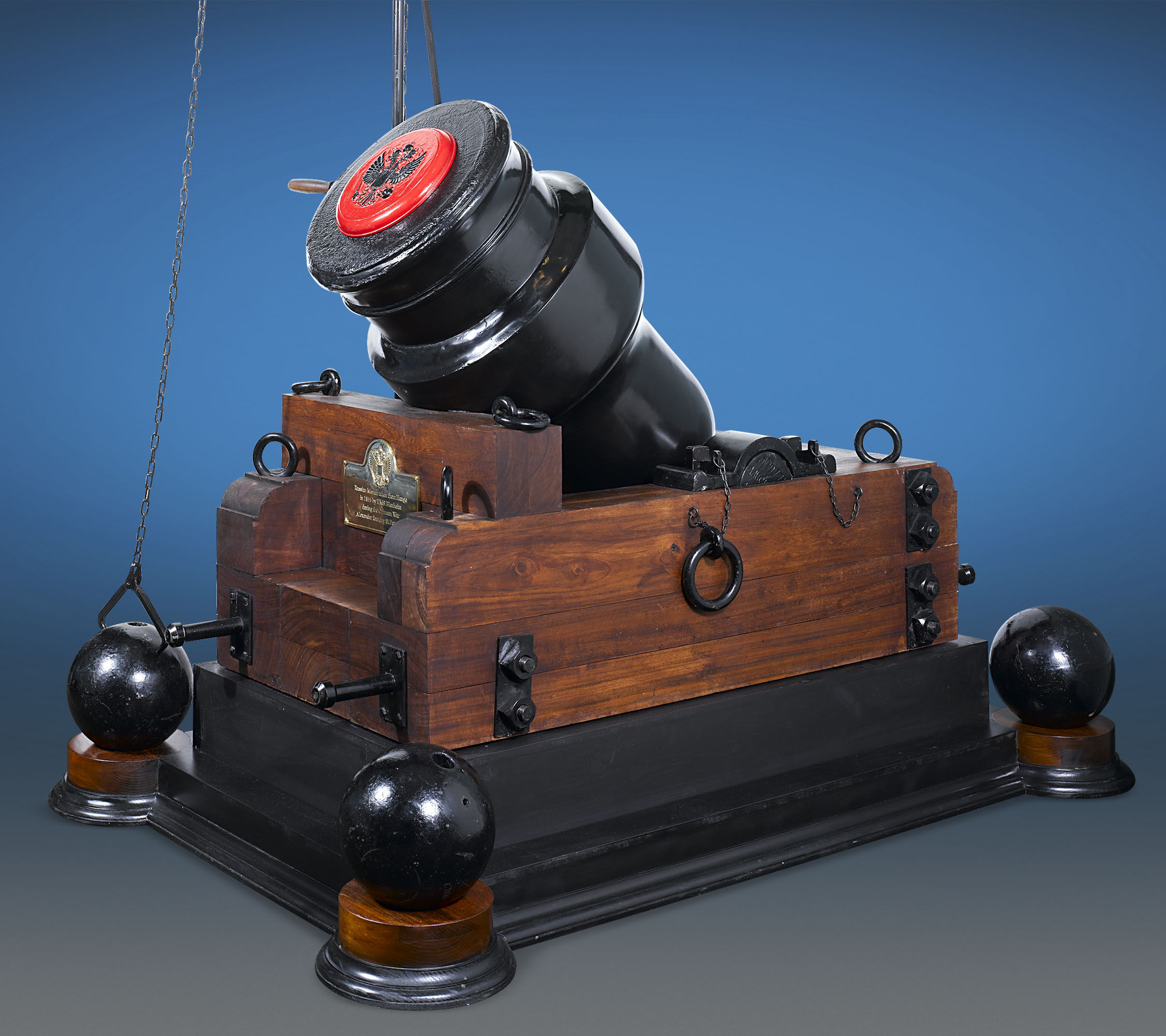
This Russian cast-iron mortar was captured at Hanko by the Royal Navy during the Crimean War.

The emigrants' memorial statue.

The site was already known by sailors in the 15th century. Petroglyphs from that time are carved into the rock at the Hauensuoli (Swedish: Gäddtarmen, English: Pike's Gut) island.

Hanko has a long history of wars and battles. The Battle of Gangut between Swedish and Russian navies was fought in 1714 in the archipelago north of the peninsula. The battle was the first-ever victory of the Russian regular fleet.

The fortification works on the Hanko Peninsula had already been started by the end of the 18th century, when the Swedish constructed three separate forts on the outlying islands. The forts were taken over by Russia in 1809, and were later bombarded by the Royal Navy during the Crimean War and were eventually blown up during the hostilities by their own defenders.

The city was founded in 1874, soon after the Hanko-Hyvinkää railway was inaugurated in 1872. The Imperial Charter for the city was granted by Emperor Alexander II.

The Hanko area is suitable for quarrying granite, and in 1886 Ab Granit Oy (The Granite Company, Ltd.) began to do just that. Hanko granite was exported worldwide, and was used in construction of the Ateneum, the Helsinki Central Station, and other iconic Helsinki buildings, as well as buildings in St. Petersburg and elsewhere.

In the late 19th and early 20th centuries, Hanko was the port of choice for emigrants leaving Finland for a new life in North America. A memorial statue, showing birds in flight, commemorates this.

In the late 19th century, while Finland was still a Grand Duchy under Russia, Hanko was a popular spa resort for the Russian nobility. Some of the buildings from that period survive, notably the Hanko Casino (which is not a gambling establishment, but a former banquet hall of the spa). It is currently a restaurant. The Hotel Continental (1901) (now the Hotel Regatta) was designed by architect Lars Sonck in the notable Jugendstil style of the time; after falling into disrepair, the hotel was restored to its former glory in 2013.

Field Marshal C. G. Mannerheim owned a café, De fyra vindarnas hus (Finnish: Neljän Tuulen Tupa, English: The House of the Four Winds), which is still popular among tourists and residents alike.

The Bengtskär lighthouse, situated 25 km (16 mi) southwest of Hanko, is the tallest (52 m or 171 ft) in the Nordic countries. It was built in 1906 and was the first lighthouse museum in Finland.

=== Soviet naval base ===
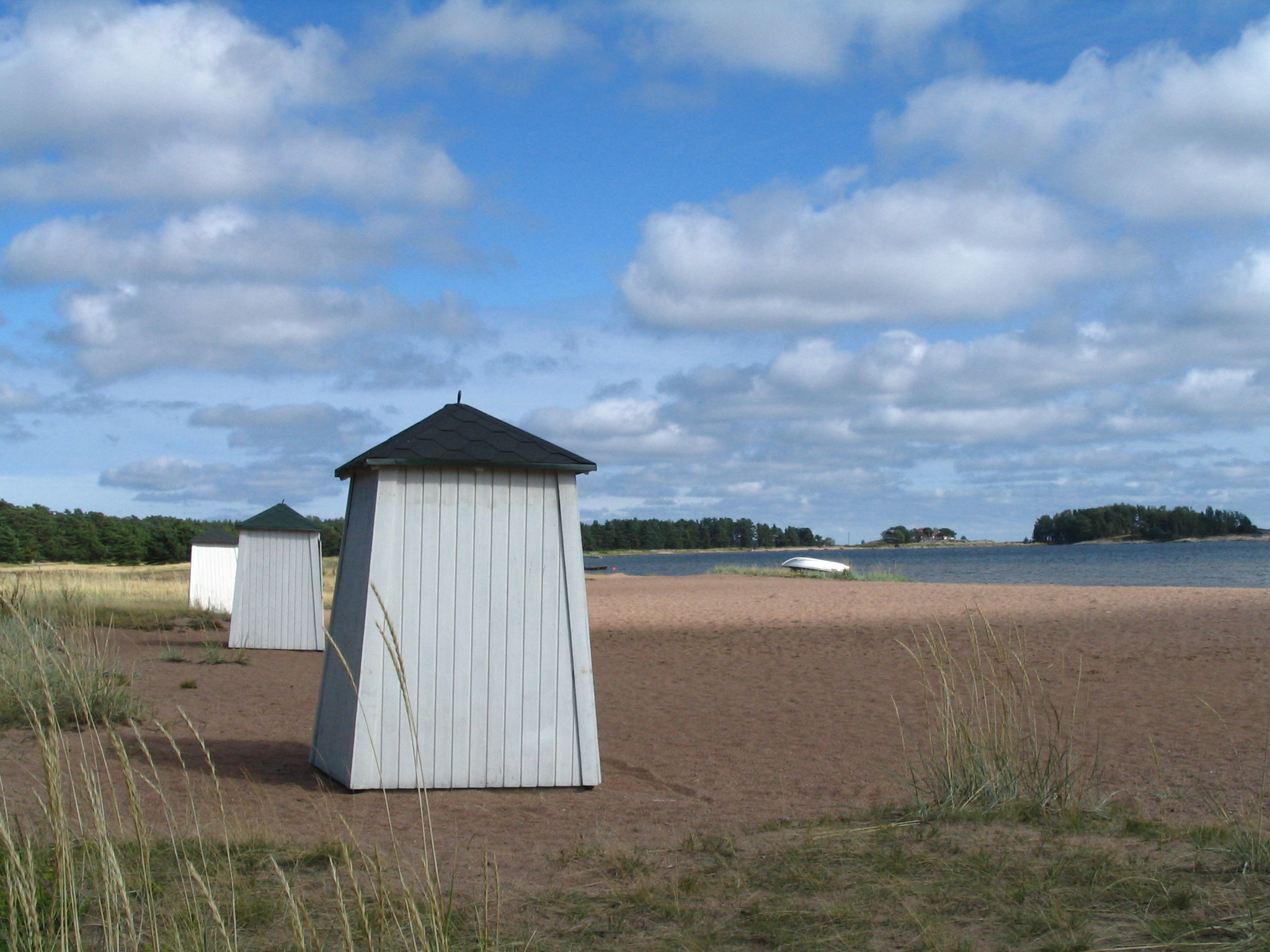
Långsanda, one of the several beaches in Hanko.

In the Moscow Peace Treaty that ended the Winter War on 13 March 1940, Hanko was leased to the Soviet Union as a naval base for a period of 30 years. During the Continuation War, Soviet troops were forced to evacuate Hanko in early December 1941. The Soviet Union renounced the lease formally in the Paris peace treaty of 1947. As a curiosity, it can be noted that the short Russo-Finnish front across the base of the peninsula on the Finnish side was held in part by volunteer troops from Sweden. A museum has been established at this location, among the trenches and other remnants of the war.

The role of the Hanko naval base was replaced by Porkkala in the Moscow Armistice between Finland and the Soviet Union of 19 September 1944. Porkkala was returned to Finland in January 1956.

== Events ==
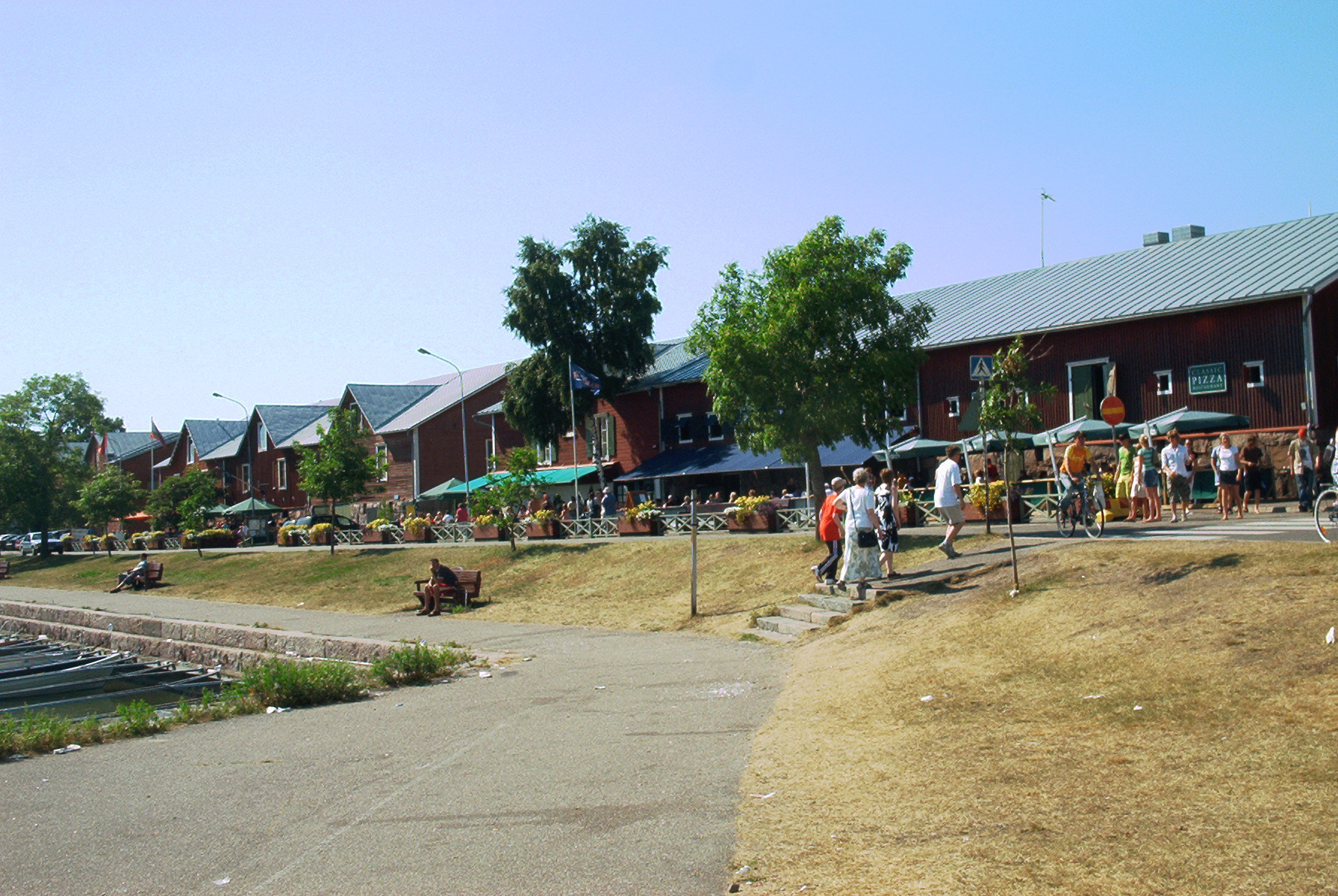
Restaurants by the marina in the busy summer tourist season.

The Hangon Regatta is a traditional fixture on the Finnish social scene, and is the town's main summer event. Sailing enthusiasts attend to compete, but there are also others, mostly young people, with little or no interest in sailing, who attend only in order to party and drink. The latter constitute the so-called "Regatta tail", which is not appreciated by most of the town's residents.

Other traditional summer activities are the "Tennis Week", the "Sea Horse" riding competitions, the "Summer Theatre" and Hanko Music Festival events.

Several sandy beaches and a multitude of leisure harbors attract tourists during the summer months. It is precisely because of these factors that Hanko has also been called the "Riviera of Finland".

== Politics ==
Results of the 2023 Finnish parliamentary election in Hanko:

- Social Democratic Party 28.5%
- Swedish People's Party 27.6%
- Finns Party 16.6%
- National Coalition Party 10.8%
- Left Alliance 4.1%
- Green League 3.4%
- Movement Now 2.8%
- Christian Democrats 2.8%
- Centre Party 1.5%

== Sports ==
Hangö IK sports club was founded in 1903. It is best known for its football team which has played one season in the Finnish premier division Mestaruussarja, in 1962, and a number of seasons in the second tier Ykkönen. Their home ground is located at the Rukki Arena. The club also has activities in handball, athletics, table tennis and powerlifting.

== Notable people ==
- Tapio Wirkkala (1915–1985), designer and sculptor, was born in Hanko

== International relations ==
=== Twin towns — Sister cities ===
Hanko is twinned with:

- (Denmark) Gentofte
- (Estonia) Haapsalu
- (Sweden) Halmstad
- (Norway) Stord

== See also ==
- Bromarv
- Port of Hanko
