= Soviet destroyer Minsk =

Destroyer of the Soviet Navy

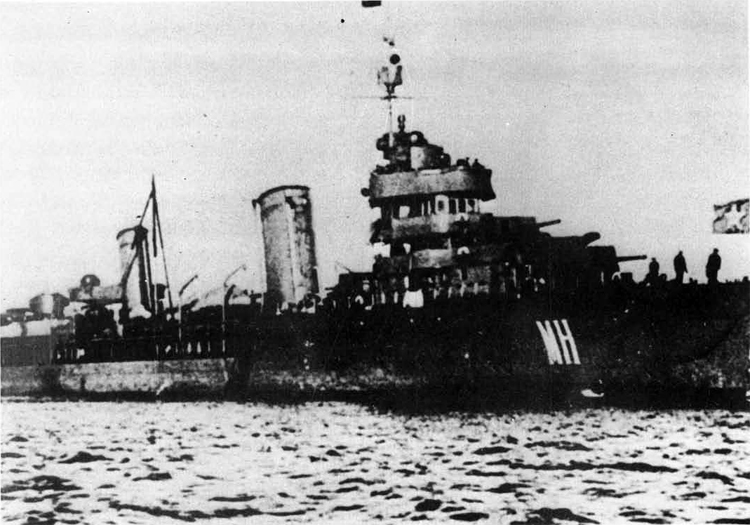
- Minsk

History

Soviet Union
- Name: Minsk (Russian: Минск)
- Namesake: Minsk
- Ordered: 2nd Five-Year Plan
- Builder: Shipyard No. 190 (Zhandov), Leningrad
- Yard number: 471
- Laid down: 5 October 1934
- Launched: 6 November 1935
- Commissioned: 10 November 1938
- Renamed: As Chorokh, 13 December 1954; As UTS-14, 27 December 1956
- Reclassified: As a destroyer, 12 January 1949; As a training ship, 31 July 1951; As a target ship, 22 April 1958
- Stricken: 3 April 1958
- Fate: Sunk as target, 1958

General characteristics (as built)
- Class & type: Leningrad-class destroyer leader
- Displacement: 2,350 long tons (2,390 t) (standard); 2,680 long tons (2,720 t) (full load)
- Length: 127.5 m (418 ft 4 in) (o/a)
- Beam: 11.7 m (38 ft 5 in)
- Draft: 4.06 m (13 ft 4 in)
- Installed power: 3 × three-drum boilers; 66,000 shp (49,000 kW)
- Propulsion: 3 shafts; 3 geared steam turbines
- Speed: 40 knots (74 km/h; 46 mph)
- Range: 2,100 nmi (3,900 km; 2,400 mi) at 20 knots (37 km/h; 23 mph)
- Complement: 250 (311 wartime)
- Sensors & processing systems: Arktur hydrophones
- Armament: 5 × single 130 mm (5.1 in) guns; 2 × single 76.2 mm (3 in) AA guns; 2 × single 45 mm (1.8 in) AA guns; 2 × quadruple 533 mm (21 in) torpedo tubes; 68–115 mines; 52 depth charges

Minsk (Russian: Минск) was one of six Leningrad-class destroyer leaders built for the Soviet Navy during the 1930s, one of the three Project 38 variants. Completed in 1939, the ship was assigned to the Baltic Fleet and played a minor role in the Winter War against Finland in 1939–1940. After the start of Operation Barbarossa, the German invasion of the Soviet Union in June 1941, Minsk covered minelaying operations and provided naval gunfire support to Soviet units. She escorted ships during the Soviet evacuation of Tallinn, Estonia, in late August. The ship was sunk by German dive bombers on 23 September, although her wreck was salvaged in 1942 and repaired. Minsk was recommissioned in 1943 but the repairs were not completed until the following year. The ship was reclassified as a training ship in 1951, then became a target ship in 1958 and was sunk that year.

== Design and description ==
Impressed by the French large destroyer (contre-torpilleur) designs such as the Vauquelin class of the early 1930s, the Soviets designed their own version. The Leningrad class had an overall length of 127.5 meters (418 ft 4 in) and were 122 meters (400 ft 3 in) long at the waterline. The ships had a beam of 11.7 meters (38 ft 5 in), and a draft of 4.06 meters (13 ft 4 in) at deep load. Built in two batches, the second batch (Project 38) displaced 2,350 long tons (2,390 t) at standard load and 2,680 long tons (2,720 t) at deep load. Their crew numbered 250 officers and sailors in peacetime and 311 in wartime. The ships had three geared steam turbines, each driving one propeller, designed to produce 66,000 shaft horsepower (49,000 kW) using steam from three three-drum boilers which was intended to give them a maximum speed of 40 knots (74 km/h; 46 mph). The Leningrads carried enough fuel oil to give them a range of 2,100 nautical miles (3,900 km; 2,400 mi) at 20 knots (37 km/h; 23 mph).

As built, the Leningrad-class ships mounted five 130-millimeter (5.1 in) B-13 guns in two pairs of superfiring single mounts fore and aft of the superstructure and another mount between the bridge and the forward funnel. The guns were protected by gun shields. Anti-aircraft defense was provided by a pair of 76.2-millimeter (3 in) 34-K AA guns in single mounts on the aft superstructure and a pair of 45-millimeter (1.8 in) 21-K AA guns mounted on either side of the bridge as well as six 12.7-millimeter (0.50 in) DShK machine guns. They carried eight 533 mm (21.0 in) torpedo tubes in two rotating quadruple mounts; each tube was provided with a reload. The ships could also carry a maximum of either 68 or 115 mines and 52 depth charges. They were fitted with a set of Arktur hydrophones for anti-submarine work.

=== Modifications ===
During the war, Minsk exchanged her two 21-K mounts for six 37-millimeter (1.5 in) 70-K AA guns. She received a British Type 128 ASDIC system and was fitted with a Type 291 early-warning radar. After the war, all of the 76- and 37-millimeter guns were replaced by a dozen water-cooled V-11M versions of the 70-K gun in twin mounts. During the 1950s, the radars were replaced by Top Bow, EWS Top, Plum Jar and Ball End radars and the pole foremast was replaced by a tripod mast to support them.

== Construction and career ==
Minsk, named after the capital of Belorussia, was laid down on 5 October 1934 at Shipyard No. 190 (Zhdanov) in Leningrad as yard number 471 and launched on 6 November 1935. Commissioned on 10 November 1938, she was assigned to the Red Banner Baltic Fleet in February 1939. She sailed to Tallinn on 22 October when the Soviet Union began to occupy Estonia. After the Winter War began on 30 November, Minsk and her sister ship Leningrad bombarded Finnish coastal defenses on Saarenpää Island, part of the Beryozovye Islands, on 10 December and again on 30 December 1939 – 3 January 1940; Minsk bombarded them by herself on 18–19 December as well. She was badly damaged by a storm in September and under repair until 17 June 1941.

The beginning of Operation Barbarossa five days later, found Minsk in Tallinn as part of the 5th Destroyer Division and she was ordered to cover mine-laying operations at the entrance to the Gulf of Finland between Hanko and Osmussaar on 23–27 June. On 3 July she helped to lay minefield covering the approaches to Tallinn. The ship bombarded German positions around Tallinn on 23–27 August, firing 563 shells from her main guns. One of those guns was struck by a German shell on 27 August. That night, the Soviets began evacuating the port, covered by Minsk, flying the flag of Rear Admiral Y. A. Panteleyev, the fleet chief of staff. The ship continued to provide gunfire support until all of the evacuees were loaded by the morning of 28 August. Later that night, a mine detonated in one of her paravanes, damaging the ship's hull. The explosion flooded three compartments with 600 t (591 long tons) of water and Captain 2nd rank Peter Petunin ordered her to be anchored for the night lest she strike anymore mines; the ship reached Kronstadt the following day.

On 30 August, Minsk was assigned to provide gunfire support to Soviet troops in the Kronstadt/Oranienbaum area together with the battleships Oktyabrskaya Revolutsiya and Marat, the heavy cruiser Kirov and the destroyers Steregushchy, Smetlivy, Gordy, Slavny and Surovy and the gunboat Volga. Junkers Ju 87 dive-bombers of StG 2 attacked the ships in Kronstadt harbor on 23 September. Minsk was initially hit with three 100 kilograms (220 lb) bombs that knocked out all her power, set her on fire and flooded part of the ship. She drifted until her stern grounded near the Leningrad lighthouse, although she was pulled off by tugboats and towed to the harbor. Later in the day, a large bomb exploded 40 meters (130 ft) away and further damaged the hull. Minsk sank in shallow water later that night. She was refloated in August 1942 and received temporary repairs at the Kronstadt Marine Plant. The ship steamed under her own power to Shipyard No. 190 on 9 November for permanent repairs. Minsk was recommissioned on 22 June 1943, although her repairs were not official completed until 28 August 1944.

She continued to serve with the Baltic Fleet postwar and was reclassified as a destroyer on 12 January 1949 like her surviving sister ships. Minsk was converted into a training ship of the Dzerzhinsky Higher Naval Engineering School in Leningrad on 31 July 1951. She was reclassified an unpowered training ship on 8 April 1953, renamed Chorokh on 13 December 1954, then UTS-14 on 27 December 1956. The vessel was struck from the Navy List on 3 April 1958, turned into a floating target on 22 April and sunk later that year during testing of new missiles in the Gulf of Finland near the island of Maly Tyuters.

== Bibliography ==
- Breyer, Siegfried (1992). Soviet Warship Development: Volume 1: 1917-1937. London: Conway Maritime Press. ISBN 0-85177-604-3.
- Budzbon, Przemysław (1980). "Soviet Union". In Chesneau, Roger (ed.). Conway's All the World's Fighting Ships 1922–1946. Greenwich, UK: Conway Maritime Press. pp. 318–346. ISBN 0-85177-146-7.
- Budzbon, Przemysław; Radziemski, Jan & Twardowski, Marek (2022). Warships of the Soviet Fleets 1939–1945. Vol. I: Major Combatants. Annapolis, Maryland: Naval Institute Press. ISBN 978-1-68247-877-6.
- Hill, Alexander (2018). Soviet Destroyers of World War II. New Vanguard. Vol. 256. Oxford: Osprey. ISBN 978-1-4728-2256-7.
- Kachur, Pavel (2008). "Гончие псы" Красного флота. "Ташкент", "Баку", "Ленинград" [Hounds of the Red Fleet: Tashkent, Baku, Leningrad] (in Russian). Moscow: Yauza/Eksmo. ISBN 978-5-699-31614-4.
- Platonov, Andrey V. (2002). Энциклопедия советских надводных кораблей 1941–1945 [Encyclopedia of Soviet Surface Ships 1941–1945] (in Russian). Saint Petersburg: Poligon. ISBN 5-89173-178-9.
- Rohwer, Jürgen (2005). Chronology of the War at Sea 1939–1945: The Naval History of World War Two (3rd rev. ed.). Annapolis, Maryland: Naval Institute Press. ISBN 1-59114-119-2.
- Rohwer, Jürgen & Monakov, Mikhail S. (2001). Stalin's Ocean-Going Fleet. London: Frank Cass. ISBN 0-7146-4895-7.
