= Soviet destroyer Leningrad =

Soviet Navy destroyer

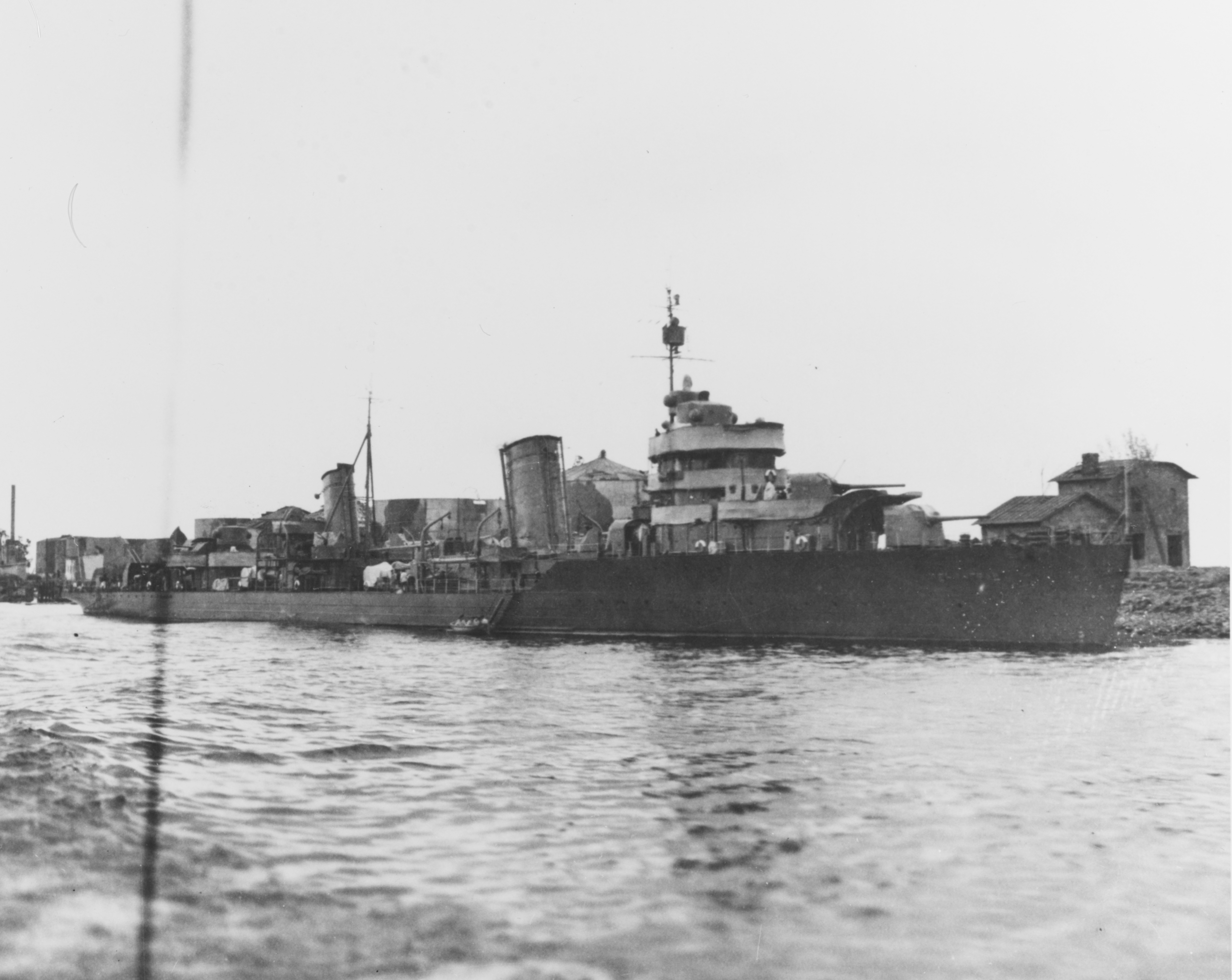
- Leningrad-class destroyer Leningrad in Leningrad, the city which the lead ship is named after, June 1944

History

Soviet Union
- Name: Leningrad (Russian: Ленингра́д)
- Namesake: Leningrad
- Ordered: 1st Five-Year Plan
- Builder: Shipyard 190 (Zhdanov), Leningrad
- Yard number: 450
- Laid down: 5 November 1932
- Launched: 17 November 1933
- Commissioned: 5 December 1936
- Out of service: 18 April 1958
- Renamed: As TsL-75, 18 April 1958; As PKZ-16, 15 September 1960; As SM-5, 10 August 1962
- Reclassified: As a destroyer, 12 January 1949; As a target ship, 18 April 1958; As an accommodation ship, 15 September 1960; As a target ship, 10 August 1962
- Fate: Sunk after being used as target ship, May 1963

General characteristics (as built)
- Class & type: Leningrad-class destroyer
- Displacement: 2,150 long tons (2,180 t) (standard); 2,582 long tons (2,623 t) (full load)
- Length: 127.5 m (418 ft 4 in) (o/a)
- Beam: 11.7 m (38 ft 5 in)
- Draft: 4.06 m (13 ft 4 in)
- Installed power: 3 three-drum boilers; 66,000 shp (49,000 kW)
- Propulsion: 3 shafts; 3 geared steam turbines
- Speed: 40 knots (74 km/h; 46 mph)
- Range: 2,100 nmi (3,900 km; 2,400 mi) at 20 knots (37 km/h; 23 mph)
- Complement: 250 (311 wartime)
- Sensors & processing systems: Arktur hydrophones
- Armament: 5 × single 130 mm (5.1 in) guns; 2 × single 76.2 mm (3 in) AA guns; 2 × single 45 mm (1.8 in) AA guns; 2 × quadruple 533 mm (21 in) torpedo tubes; 68–115 mines; 52 depth charges

Leningrad (Russian: Ленингра́д) was the lead ship of her class of six destroyer flotilla leaders built for the Soviet Navy during the 1930s, one of the three Project 1 variants. Completed in 1936, the ship was assigned to the Baltic Fleet and played a minor role in the Winter War against Finland in 1939–1940. After the start of Operation Barbarossa, the German invasion of the Soviet Union in June 1941, Leningrad covered minelaying operations, laid mines herself, and provided naval gunfire support to Soviet units. She escorted ships during the evacuation of Tallinn, Estonia, in August and then bombarded German troops during the Siege of Leningrad. The ship was assigned to evacuate Soviet troops from their enclave in Hanko, Finland, in November, but was badly damaged by mines en route and forced to return to Leningrad for repairs. After they were completed, Leningrad resumed shelling German positions and continued to do so until the Leningrad–Novgorod Offensive drove them away from the city in January 1944.

After the war, the ship was modernized in 1951–1954. She became a target ship in 1958 and was renamed TsL-75. The ship was transferred to the Northern Fleet the following year and was disarmed in 1960. She was converted into an accommodation ship that year and was renamed PKZ-16. The hulk was reconverted into a target ship, SM-5, in 1962. The following year the ship was used to test anti-ship missiles and sank afterwards.

== Design and description ==
Impressed by the French large destroyer (contre-torpilleur) designs such as the Vauquelin class of the early 1930s, the Soviets designed their own version. The Leningrads had an overall length of 127.5 meters (418 ft 4 in) and were 122 meters (400 ft 3 in) long at the waterline. The ships had a beam of 11.7 meters (38 ft 5 in), and a draft of 4.06 meters (13 ft 4 in) at deep load. Built in two batches, the first batch (Project 1) displaced 2,150 long tons (2,180 t) at standard load and 2,582 long tons (2,623 t) at deep load. Their crew numbered 250 officers and sailors in peacetime and 311 in wartime. The ships had three geared steam turbines, each driving one propeller, designed to produce 66,000 shaft horsepower (49,000 kW) using steam from three three-drum boilers which was intended to give them a maximum speed of 40 knots (74 km/h; 46 mph). The Leningrads carried enough fuel oil to give them a range of 2,100 nautical miles (3,900 km; 2,400 mi) at 20 knots (37 km/h; 23 mph).

As built, the Leningrad-class ships mounted five 130-millimeter (5.1 in) B-13 guns in two pairs of superfiring single mounts fore and aft of the superstructure and another mount between the bridge and the forward funnel. The guns were protected by gun shields. Anti-aircraft defense was provided by a pair of 76.2-millimeter (3 in) 34-K AA guns in single mounts on the aft superstructure and a pair of 45-millimeter (1.8 in) 21-K AA guns mounted on either side of the bridge as well as four 12.7-millimeter (0.50 in) DK machine guns. They carried eight 533 mm (21.0 in) torpedo tubes in two rotating quadruple mounts; each tube was provided with a reload. The ships could also carry a maximum of either 68 or 115 mines and 52 depth charges. They were fitted with a set of Arktur hydrophones for anti-submarine detection.

=== Modifications ===
In 1943, Leningrad exchanged her two 21-K mounts for four 37-millimeter (1.5 in) 70-K AA guns, a twin-gun mount for the 34-K known as the 81-K and two twin-gun mounts for ex-German 37 mm SK C/30 AA guns, although these latter guns were later replaced by a pair of 70-K guns. She received a British Type 128 asdic system and was fitted with a Type 291 early-warning radar and an American SF-1 radar. After the war, all of the 76- and 37-millimeter guns were replaced by a dozen water-cooled V-11M versions of the 70-K gun in twin mounts. During the 1950s, the radars were replaced by Top Bow, EWS Top, Plum Jar and Ball End radars and the pole foremast was replaced by a tripod mast to support them.

== Construction and career ==
Leningrad, named after the capital of the former Russian Empire under its new Soviet name, was laid down on 5 November 1932 at Shipyard No. 190 (Zhdanov) in Leningrad as yard number 450 and launched on 17 November 1933. Commissioned on 5 December 1936, she was assigned to the Red Banner Baltic Fleet. After the Winter War began on 30 November, Leningrad and her sister ship Minsk bombarded Finnish coastal defense positions on Saarenpää Island, part of the Beryozovye Islands, on 10 December and again on 30 December–3 January 1940. During these missions she was badly damaged by ice and was under repair until 31 May 1941.

The beginning of Operation Barbarossa on 22 June found Leningrad in Tallinn, Estonia, as part of the 4th Destroyer Division and she was ordered to cover minelaying operations at the entrance to the Gulf of Finland between Hanko and Osmussaar on 23–27 June. On 3 July she helped to lay minefield covering the approached to Tallinn. The ship bombarded German positions around Tallinn on 23–27 August, firing 227 shells from her main guns. The Soviets began evacuating the port on the night of 27/28 August with Leningrad providing covering fire until the early morning. After Minsk was badly damaged by a mine on the 28th, Rear Admiral Y. A. Panteleyev transferred his flag to Leningrad the following day. On 30 August, Leningrad was assigned to provide gunfire support to Soviet troops in the Kronstadt/Oranienbaum area from the Leningrad Sea Canal together with the heavy cruisers Maxim Gorky and Petropavlovsk and the destroyers Svirepy, Grozyashchy, Silny, Stoyky and Storozhevoy. On 1 and 3 September, Leningrad helped to lay minefields covering the approaches to Kronstadt and Leningrad.

The ship moved to the Leningrad Sea Canal on 17 September to bombard German troops and then steamed to the Leningrad Trade Port. On 22 September, she was slightly damaged by shell splinters and moved to Kanonersky Island. Leningrad was struck by one shell and near-missed by another on 12 October. They damaged fuel and fresh-water tanks and started a small fire by igniting the propellant for a 130 mm round. The ship was repaired at Shipyard No. 196 (Sudomekh).

On 9 November she departed Kronstadt for Hanko as part of the third convoy to evacuate Soviet troops together with the destroyer Stoyky and the minelayer Ural. Bad weather forced them to seek shelter behind Gogland Island on the morning of 11 November, although they were able to resume movement that evening. Later that evening Leningrad's paravanes detonated one mine at a distance of 10 meters (33 ft), but the ship was not damaged. Early in the morning of 12 November, another mine detonated in her paravanes, but only at a distance of 5 meters (16 ft). The explosion disabled both turbines and flooded many of her fuel tanks. The ship was able to get underway again, but was forced to return to Kronstadt, escorted by two minesweepers and the transport SS Andrey Zhandov. She was repaired in Leningrad where she resumed providing gunfire support; the ship fired a total of 1,081 rounds from her 130 mm guns during 1941.

On 14 May 1942, near misses by artillery shells wounded four crewmen, disabled a searchlight and damaged a torpedo tube. During the Leningrad–Novgorod Offensive that lifted the siege of the city, Leningrad fired 650 shells in support of the attack between 14 and 18 January 1944.

=== Postwar ===
Leningrad continued to serve with the Baltic Fleet postwar and was reclassified as a destroyer on 12 January 1949. She was refitted and modernized between 19 December 1951 and 25 November 1954. After brief service, the destroyer was withdrawn from combat duty and reclassified as the target ship TsL-75 on 18 April 1958. She was assigned to the Northern Fleet on 13 October 1959. The former Leningrad was disarmed on 15 September 1960 and converted into a floating barracks, PKZ-16, then target ship SM-5 on 10 August 1962. She was used to test the new P-35 anti-ship cruise missiles of the guided missile cruiser Groznyy in May 1963 while anchored in the Kandalaksha Gulf, and was hit by two missiles, but remained afloat with a slight list. After an unsuccessful attempt to tow her back to Severodinsk, she sank in shallow water east of the island of Sennaya Luda in the Solovetsky Islands.

== See also ==
- List of ships sunk by missiles

== Bibliography ==
- Breyer, Siegfried (1992). Soviet Warship Development: Volume 1: 1917–1937. London: Conway Maritime Press. ISBN 0-85177-604-3.
- Budzbon, Przemysław (1980). "Soviet Union". In Chesneau, Roger (ed.). Conway's All the World's Fighting Ships 1922–1946. Greenwich, UK: Conway Maritime Press. pp. 318–346. ISBN 0-85177-146-7.
- Budzbon, Przemysław; Radziemski, Jan & Twardowski, Marek (2022). Warships of the Soviet Fleets 1939–1945. Vol. I: Major Combatants. Annapolis, Maryland: Naval Institute Press. ISBN 978-1-68247-877-6.
- Hill, Alexander (2018). Soviet Destroyers of World War II. New Vanguard. Vol. 256. Oxford, UK: Osprey Publishing. ISBN 978-1-4728-2256-7.
- Kachur, Pavel (2008). "Гончие псы" Красного флота. "Ташкент", "Баку", "Ленинград" [Hounds of the Red Fleet: Tashkent, Baku, Leningrad] (in Russian). Moscow: Yauza/Eksmo. ISBN 978-5-699-31614-4.
- Platonov, Andrey V. (2002). Энциклопедия советских надводных кораблей 1941–1945 [Encyclopedia of Soviet Surface Ships 1941–1945] (in Russian). Saint Petersburg: Poligon. ISBN 5-89173-178-9.
- Rohwer, Jürgen (2005). Chronology of the War at Sea 1939–1945: The Naval History of World War Two (Third Revised ed.). Annapolis, Maryland: Naval Institute Press. ISBN 1-59114-119-2.
- Rohwer, Jürgen & Monakov, Mikhail S. (2001). Stalin's Ocean-Going Fleet. London: Frank Cass. ISBN 0-7146-4895-7.
