= Soviet destroyer Svirepy =

Soviet destroyer

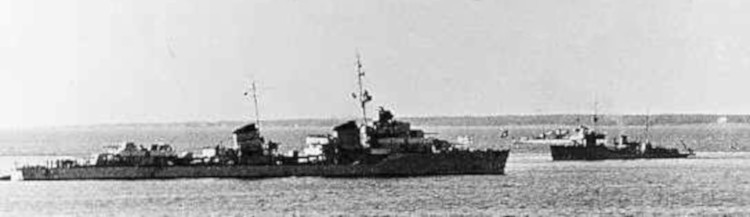
- An unidentified Storozhevoy-class destroyer in the Black Sea

History

Soviet Union
- Name: Svirepy (Свирепый (Fierce))
- Ordered: 2nd Five-Year Plan
- Builder: Shipyard No. 190 (Zhdanov), Leningrad
- Yard number: 525
- Laid down: 29 November 1936
- Launched: 28 August 1939
- Commissioned: 22 June 1941
- Out of service: 28 January 1958
- Stricken: 3 April 1958
- Fate: Scrapped after 3 April 1958

General characteristics
- Class & type: Storozhevoy-class destroyer
- Displacement: 1,727 t (1,700 long tons) (standard); 2,279 t (2,243 long tons) (full load)
- Length: 112.5 m (369 ft 1 in) (o/a)
- Beam: 10.2 m (33 ft 6 in)
- Draft: 3.98 m (13 ft 1 in)
- Installed power: 4 water-tube boilers; 54,000 shp (40,000 kW) (trials)
- Propulsion: 2 shafts, 2 steam turbine sets
- Speed: 38 knots (70 km/h; 44 mph)
- Endurance: 1,800 nmi (3,300 km; 2,100 mi) at 19 knots (35 km/h; 22 mph)
- Complement: 207 (271 wartime)
- Sensors & processing systems: Mars hydrophones
- Armament: 4 × single 130 mm (5.1 in) guns; 2 × single 76.2 mm (3 in) AA guns; 3 × single 45 mm (1.8 in) AA guns; 4 × single 12.7 mm (0.50 in) DK or DShK machine guns; 2 × triple 533 mm (21 in) torpedo tubes; 58–96 mines; 30 depth charges

Svirepy (Russian: Свирепый, lit. 'Fierce') was one of 18 Storozhevoy-class destroyers (officially known as Project 7U) built for the Soviet Navy during the late 1930s. Although she began construction as a Project 7 Gnevny-class destroyer, Svirepy was completed in 1941 to the modified Project 7U design.

With her sea trials cut short by the beginning of Operation Barbarossa in June, Svirepy was assigned to the Baltic Fleet and fought in the Gulf of Riga and the defense of Tallinn, Estonia, providing naval gunfire support to Soviet troops. Escaping relatively unscathed from the evacuation of the latter, she provided fire support during the Siege of Leningrad, though seeing little activity after repairs in early 1942. Postwar, the destroyer continued to serve with the Baltic Fleet, spending much of the late 1940s and early 1950s under refit before being scrapped in the late 1950s.

== Design and description ==
Originally built as a Gnevny-class ship, Svirepy and her sister ships were completed to the modified Project 7U design after Joseph Stalin, General Secretary of the Communist Party of the Soviet Union, ordered that the latter be built with their boilers arranged en echelon, instead of linked as in the Gnevnys, so that a ship could still move with one or two boilers disabled.

Like the Gnevnys, the Project 7U destroyers had an overall length of 112.5 meters (369 ft 1 in) and a beam of 10.2 meters (33 ft 6 in), but they had a reduced draft of 3.98 meters (13 ft 1 in) at deep load. The ships were slightly overweight, displacing 1,727 metric tons (1,700 long tons) at standard load and 2,279 metric tons (2,243 long tons) at deep load. The crew complement of the Storozhevoy class numbered 207 in peacetime, but this increased to 271 in wartime, as more personnel were needed to operate additional equipment. Each ship had a pair of geared steam turbines, each driving one propeller, rated to produce 54,000 shaft horsepower (40,000 kW) using steam from four water-tube boilers, which the designers expected would exceed the 37-knot (69 km/h; 43 mph) speed of the Project 7s because there was additional steam available. Svirepny herself reached 38 knots (70 km/h; 44 mph) during her sea trials in 1943. Variations in fuel oil capacity meant that the range of the Project 7Us varied from 1,380 to 2,700 nautical miles (2,560 to 5,000 km; 1,590 to 3,110 mi) at 19 knots (35 km/h; 22 mph); Svirepny reached 1,800 nmi (3,300 km; 2,100 mi) at that speed.

The Project 7U-class ships mounted four 130-millimeter (5.1 in) B-13 guns in two pairs of superfiring single mounts fore and aft of the superstructure. Anti-aircraft defense was provided by a pair of 76.2-millimeter (3 in) 34-K AA guns in single mounts and three 45-millimeter (1.8 in) 21-K AA guns, as well as four 12.7-millimeter (0.50 in) DK or DShK machine guns. They carried six 533 mm (21.0 in) torpedo tubes in two rotating triple mounts amidships. The ships could also carry a maximum of 58 to 96 mines and 30 depth charges. They were fitted with a set of Mars hydrophones for anti-submarine work, although these were useless at speeds over 3 knots (5.6 km/h; 3.5 mph).

=== Modifications ===
By 1943, Svirepny had exchanged one each of her 21-K and machine gun mounts for an additional 34-K mount, a pair of 37-millimeter (1.5 in) 70-K AA guns in single mounts and two twin-gun mounts for Lend-Lease, water-cooled 12.7 mm Colt-Browning machine guns. By the end of the war, she had received a British ASDIC system and an early-warning radar of unknown type. After the war, all of her AA guns were replaced by eight water-cooled V-11M versions of the 70-K gun in twin mounts.

== Construction and career ==
Svirepy was laid down in Shipyard No. 190 (Zhdanov) in Leningrad with the yard number 525 on 29 November 1936 as a Gnevny-class destroyer. She was relaid down as a Project 7U destroyer on 30 December 1938, and launched on 28 August 1939. After Operation Barbarossa, the German invasion of the Soviet Union, began on 22 June, Svirepy was accepted by the Soviet Navy that day following much-reduced trials. However, she was not officially assigned to the Baltic Fleet's 4th Destroyer Division until 18 July, although the ship participated in combat earlier. Between 1 and 2 July Svirepy escorted the battleship Oktyabrskaya Revolutsiya from Tallinn to Kronstadt with her sisters Smely and Strashny.

From 13 to 19 July, again with Smely and Strashny, she operated in Moonsund and the Gulf of Riga, fighting off repeated German air attacks. Near miss bomb explosions on 16 July flooded several compartments and bent the left propeller shaft, while splinters killed two and wounded eight crew members. During the Moonsund operations she fired over 360 76 mm and a similar amount of 45 mm shells, as well as more than 800 12.7 mm rounds, in addition to 22 130 mm diving shells at a submarine on 14 July and high-explosive shells fired in support of an 18 July amphibious landing on Virtsu. Returning to Tallinn on 20 July, she came under attack from German S-boats in Moonsund, but forced them to retire behind a smoke screen by firing fourteen 130 mm shells. After docking at Tallinn, Svirepy supported ground troops in the defense of the base, expending 328 main-gun shells in 25 bombardments.

The destroyer escaped relatively unscathed during the evacuation of Tallinn from 23 to 28 August, having her steering temporarily knocked out due to a near miss bomb explosion. Svirepy towed the damaged destroyer Gordy to Kronstadt over two days, expending 529 76 mm and 627 45 mm shells, in addition to 2,822 12.7 mm rounds, against German aircraft. She anchored in the Kronstadt roadstead at 23:00 on 29 August. The destroyer transferred to the Leningrad Trade Port on 4 September and expended 127 130 mm shells between 21 and 23 September, while also coming under air attack on multiple occasions. On 1 October Svirepy was hit by a shell on her aft superstructure that disabled a 76 mm gun and a torpedo tube in addition to destroying berthing compartments, wounding one and killing five crewmen. (Note: Platonov says that the hit killed six crewmen and wounded three others and damaged a 130 mm gun and a diesel generator.) Repairs were postponed, and the destroyer returned to fire support duty on 4 October, expending 377 main-gun shells in 51 bombardments over the next month and a half.

Svirepy made three trips to Gogland between 23 November and 6 December, covering attempts to save the wrecked transport Iosif Stalin. She was engaged by Finnish coastal artillery twice, but escaped unscathed. Relocated to Leningrad on 12 December, the destroyer began repairs at Shipyard No. 189 on New Year's Day 1942. The ship had fired a total of 1,073 main-gun rounds during 1941. For the rest of the war, Svirepy saw little action. Between 1942 and 1943 she remained in Leningrad, participating only in defense against air raids. In these two years her 130 mm guns carried out thirteen firings, all training except for one February 1943 bombardment in support of the Battle of Krasny Bor during which she expended 120 shells. The ship received minor damage from the nearby explosions of three aerial bombs on 4 April 1942. From 14 to 19 January 1944 the destroyer made her last bombardment during the Krasnoye Selo–Ropsha Offensive, firing 415 130 mm shells.

Postwar, Svirepy became part of the 4th Fleet when the Baltic Fleet was split between 25 February 1946 and 4 January 1956. She was refitted and modernized at Neptun Werft in Rostock from 10 July 1947 to either 2 January 1951 or 6 July 1955 (sources differ on the exact end date). Her crew was disbanded on 28 January 1958 before she was struck from the Navy List on 3 April of that year prior to being scrapped.

== Sources ==
- Balakin, Sergey (2007). Легендарные "семёрки" Эсминцы "сталинской" серии [Legendary Sevens: Stalin's Destroyer Series] (in Russian). Moscow: Yauza/Eksmo. ISBN 978-5-699-23784-5.
- Berezhnoy, Sergey (2002). Крейсера и миноносцы. Справочник [Guide to Cruisers and Destroyers] (in Russian). Moscow: Voenizdat. ISBN 5-203-01780-8.
- Hill, Alexander (2018). Soviet Destroyers of World War II. New Vanguard. Vol. 256. Oxford, UK: Osprey Publishing. ISBN 978-1-4728-2256-7.
- Platonov, Andrey V. (2002). Энциклопедия советских надводных кораблей 1941–1945 [Encyclopedia of Soviet Surface Ships 1941–1945] (in Russian). Saint Petersburg: Poligon. ISBN 5-89173-178-9.
- Rohwer, Jürgen & Monakov, Mikhail S. (2001). Stalin's Ocean-Going Fleet. London: Frank Cass. ISBN 0-7146-4895-7.
- Yakubov, Vladimir & Worth, Richard (2008). "The Soviet Project 7/7U Destroyers". In Jordan, John & Dent, Stephen (eds.). Warship 2008. London: Conway. pp. 99–114. ISBN 978-1-84486-062-3.
