= Soviet destroyer Gordy (1937) =

Soviet Navy's Gnevny-class destroyer

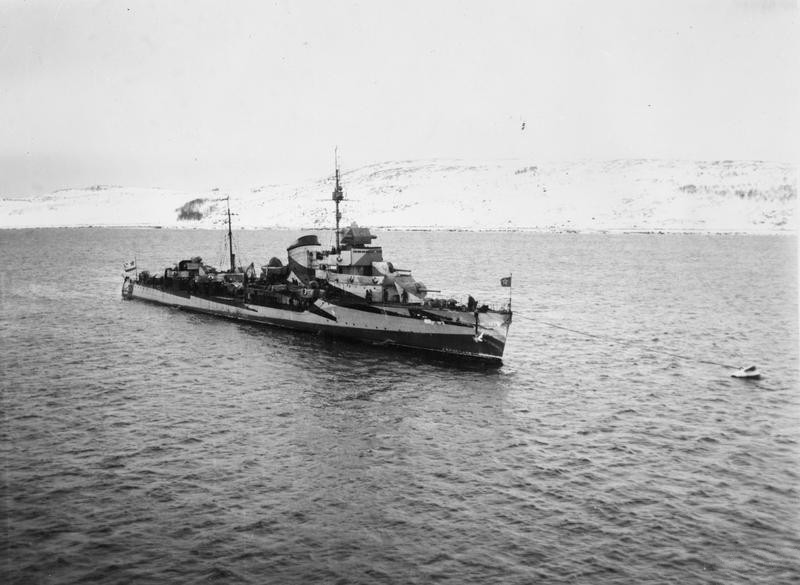
- Aerial view of sister Razumny, March 1944

History

Soviet Union
- Name: Gordy (Гордый (Proud))
- Ordered: 2nd Five-Year Plan
- Builder: Shipyard No. 190 (Zhdanov), Leningrad
- Laid down: 25 June 1936
- Launched: 10 June 1937
- Completed: 23 December 1938
- Fate: Sunk by mines, 14 November 1941

General characteristics (Gnevny as completed, 1938)
- Class & type: Gnevny-class destroyer
- Displacement: 1,612 t (1,587 long tons) (standard)
- Length: 112.8 m (370 ft 1 in) (o/a)
- Beam: 10.2 m (33 ft 6 in)
- Draft: 4.8 m (15 ft 9 in)
- Installed power: 3 water-tube boilers; 48,000 shp (36,000 kW)
- Propulsion: 2 shafts; 2 geared steam turbines
- Speed: 38 knots (70 km/h; 44 mph)
- Range: 2,720 nmi (5,040 km; 3,130 mi) at 19 knots (35 km/h; 22 mph)
- Complement: 197 (236 wartime)
- Sensors & processing systems: Mars hydrophone
- Armament: 4 × single 130 mm (5.1 in) guns; 2 × single 76.2 mm (3 in) AA guns; 2 × single 45 mm (1.8 in) AA guns; 2 × single 12.7 mm (0.50 in) AA machineguns; 2 × triple 533 mm (21 in) torpedo tubes; 60–96 mines; 2 × depth charge racks, 25 depth charges

Gordy (Russian: Гордый, lit. 'Proud') was one of 29 Gnevny-class destroyers (officially known as Project 7) built for the Soviet Navy during the late 1930s. Completed in 1938, she was assigned to the Baltic Fleet. The ship was covering a minelaying operation after the start of the German invasion of the Soviet Union (Operation Barbarossa) in June 1941 when she entered a German minefield. One of her sister ships had her bow blown off and Gordy rescued the survivors. The ship provided naval gunfire support for Soviet ground forces over the next several months, although she was badly damaged by a mine during the evacuation of Tallinn, Estonia, in August. After repairs, Gordy was assigned to evacuate Soviet troops from their enclave in Hanko, Finland, in November, but struck several mines en route and sank with heavy loss of life.

== Design and description ==
Having decided to build the large and expensive 40-knot (74 km/h; 46 mph) Leningrad-class destroyer leaders, the Soviet Navy sought Italian assistance in designing smaller and cheaper destroyers. They licensed the plans for the Folgore class and, in modifying it for their purposes, overloaded a design that was already somewhat marginally stable.

The Gnevnys had an overall length of 112.8 meters (370 ft 1 in), a beam of 10.2 meters (33 ft 6 in), and a draft of 4.8 meters (15 ft 9 in) at deep load. The ships were significantly overweight, almost 200 metric tons (197 long tons) heavier than designed, displacing 1,612 metric tons (1,587 long tons) at standard load and 2,039 metric tons (2,007 long tons) at deep load. Their crew numbered 197 officers and sailors in peacetime and 236 in wartime. The ships had a pair of geared steam turbines, each driving one propeller, rated to produce 48,000 shaft horsepower (36,000 kW) using steam from three water-tube boilers which was intended to give them a maximum speed of 37 knots (69 km/h; 43 mph). The designers had been conservative in rating the turbines and many, but not all, of the ships handily exceeded their designed speed during their sea trials. Others fell considerably short of it, although specific figures for most individual ships have not survived. Variations in fuel oil capacity meant that the range of the Gnevnys varied between 1,670 to 3,145 nautical miles (3,093 to 5,825 km; 1,922 to 3,619 mi) at 19 knots (35 km/h; 22 mph).

As built, the Gnevny-class ships mounted four 130-millimeter (5.1 in) B-13 guns in two pairs of superfiring single mounts fore and aft of the superstructure. Anti-aircraft defense was provided by a pair of 76.2-millimeter (3 in) 34-K AA guns in single mounts and a pair of 45-millimeter (1.8 in) 21-K AA guns as well as two 12.7-millimeter (0.50 in) DK or DShK machine guns. They carried six 533 mm (21.0 in) torpedo tubes in two rotating triple mounts; each tube was provided with a reload. The ships could also carry a maximum of either 60 or 95 mines and 25 depth charges. They were fitted with a set of Mars hydrophones for anti-submarine work, although they were useless at speeds over 3 knots (5.6 km/h; 3.5 mph). The ships were equipped with two K-1 paravanes intended to destroy mines and a pair of depth-charge throwers.

== Construction and service ==
Built in Leningrad's Shipyard No. 190 (Zhdanov) as yard number 514, Gordy was laid down on 25 June 1936 and launched on 10 June 1937. Completed on 23 December 1938, the ship was assigned to the Baltic Fleet. She served on patrol and escort duty during the Winter War. On 23 June 1941, a day after Operation Barbarossa began, Gordy, under the command of Kapitan 3-go ranga (Captain 3rd Rank) Yevgeny Yefet, was tasked with covering minelaying operations at the mouth of the Gulf of Finland together with the rest of the 1st Division of the Baltic Fleet's Light Forces Detachment – the light cruiser Maxim Gorky and her sisters Gnevny and Steregushchy. They ran into a German minefield 16 to 18 nautical miles (30 to 33 km; 18 to 21 mi) northwest of Tahkuna Lighthouse; Gordy was slightly damaged by a mine that detonated when it was struck by one of her paravanes, but Gnevny had her bow blown off when she struck another one. Gordy took off Gnevny's crew after submarine periscopes were reported spotted and unsuccessfully attempted to sink her with gunfire. Later that day, she was lightly damaged when her paravanes triggered the explosion of two mines. The destroyer subsequently fought in the defense of Moonsund and Tallinn, Estonia, as German ground forces advanced northward, as well as laying mines herself.

She participated in an unsuccessful attack on a group of German landing craft off the mouth of the Daugava River on 13 July. Together with the light cruiser Kirov, the destroyer leaders Leningrad and Minsk, and several other destroyers, Gordy fired 253 shells to support the defenders of Tallinn, between 24 and 26 August. While covering the evacuation of Tallinn on 28 August as part of the detachment of main forces led by Kirov, a mine exploded in one of the ship's paravanes. The detonation caused severe damage to her hull and flooded all three of her boiler rooms with 420 t (410 long tons) of water. Her captain ordered 45 specialists to remain aboard ship and had the rest of the crew taken aboard the minesweeper Gak. She was towed to Kronstadt by the destroyer Svirepy, a process that took two days as it was necessary to anchor at night. The two destroyers were subjected to constant German air attacks, and Gordy expended all of her anti-aircraft ammunition but escaped unscathed.

At Kronstadt she was placed in a dry dock for repairs. Gordy received splinter damage during an air raid on Kronstadt on 21 September. Nine days later, the ship was transferred to Leningrad's Baltic Shipyard to finish her repairs, which were completed on 8 October. She was positioned off Ust-Izhora on 14 October to provide naval gunfire support for Soviet troops. Gordy bombarded German positions in support of a local counter-attack near Sinyavino between 20 and 25 October. During 1941 the ship fired a total of 349 shells from her 130 mm guns.

On 13 November she departed Gogland Island for Hanko as part of the fourth convoy to evacuate Soviet troops alongside the destroyer Surovy and the minelayer Ural. The ships ran into a minefield and Surovy was blown up, after which Gordy took the lead position in the convoy. The following morning a mine detonated in one of her paravanes without damage. Ten minutes later another struck the hull at 03:30 between the aft boiler room and the forward engine room and knocked out her power, killing all personnel in both rooms. The ship listed at 30° which decreased to 10° with counter-flooding. Although the ship remained afloat due to her bulkheads, Yefet decided to abandon ship. While drifting, Gordy's stern struck another mine which caused her to sink suddenly at 59°47′N 25°09′E. The other ships in the convoy rescued 76 survivors and an additional dozen were able to sail to Gogland in one of her boats; among those lost was Yefet, her only wartime captain. She was officially struck from the Navy List on 19 November.

== Sources ==
- Balakin, Sergey (2007). Легендарные "семёрки" Эсминцы "сталинской" серии [Legendary Sevens: Stalin's destroyer series] (in Russian). Moscow: Yauza/Eksmo. ISBN 978-5-699-23784-5.
- Berezhnoy, Sergey (2002). Крейсера и миноносцы. Справочник [Guide to Cruisers and Destroyers] (in Russian). Moscow: Voenizdat. ISBN 5-203-01780-8.
- Budzbon, Przemysaw (1980). "Soviet Union". In Chesneau, Roger (ed.). Conway's All the World's Fighting Ships 1922–1946. Greenwich, UK: Conway Maritime Press. pp. 318–346. ISBN 0-85177-146-7.
- Hill, Alexander (2018). Soviet Destroyers of World War II. New Vanguard. Vol. 256. Oxford, UK: Osprey Publishing. ISBN 978-1-4728-2256-7.
- Platonov, Andrey (2002). Энциклопедия советских надводных кораблей 1941–1945 [Encyclopedia of Soviet Surface Ships 1941–1945] (in Russian). Saint Petersburg: Poligon. ISBN 5-89173-178-9.
- Rohwer, Jürgen (2005). Chronology of the War at Sea 1939–1945: The Naval History of World War Two (Third Revised ed.). Annapolis, Maryland: Naval Institute Press. ISBN 1-59114-119-2.
- Rohwer, Jürgen & Monakov, Mikhail S. (2001). Stalin's Ocean-Going Fleet. London: Frank Cass. ISBN 0-7146-4895-7.
- Yakubov, Vladimir & Worth, Richard (2008). "The Soviet Project 7/7U Destroyers". In Jordan, John & Dent, Stephen (eds.). Warship 2008. London: Conway. pp. 99–114. ISBN 978-1-84486-062-3.
