= Soviet destroyer Steregushchy (1938) =

Destroyer of the Soviet Navy

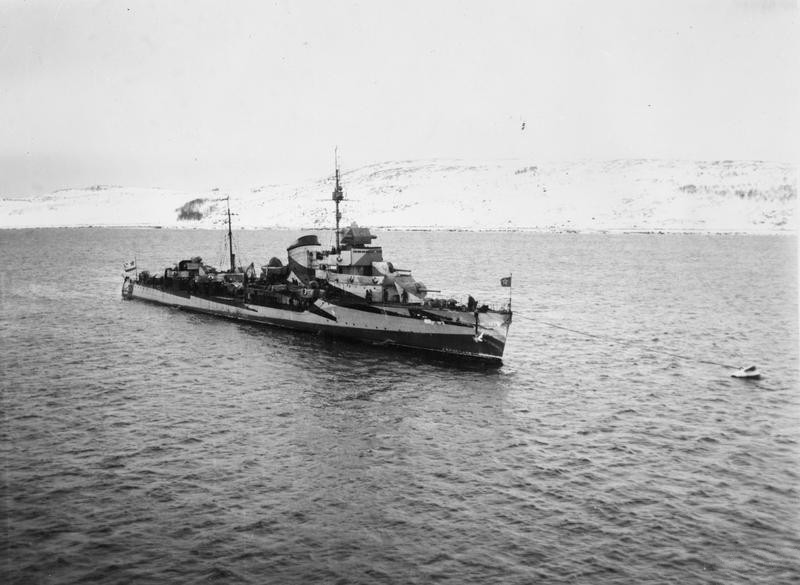
- Aerial view of sister ship Razumny, March 1944

History

Soviet Union
- Name: Steregushchy (Стерегущий (Watchful))
- Ordered: 2nd Five-Year Plan
- Builder: Shipyard No. 190 (Zhdanov), Leningrad
- Laid down: 12 August 1936
- Launched: 18 January 1938
- Completed: 30 October 1939
- Stricken: 28 January 1958
- Fate: Scrapped, 1959

General characteristics (Gnevny as completed, 1938)
- Class & type: Gnevny-class destroyer
- Displacement: 1,612 t (1,587 long tons) (standard)
- Length: 112.8 m (370 ft 1 in) (o/a)
- Beam: 10.2 m (33 ft 6 in)
- Draft: 4.8 m (15 ft 9 in)
- Installed power: 3 water-tube boilers; 48,000 shp (36,000 kW)
- Propulsion: 2 shafts; 2 geared steam turbines
- Speed: 38 knots (70 km/h; 44 mph)
- Range: 2,720 nmi (5,040 km; 3,130 mi) at 19 knots (35 km/h; 22 mph)
- Complement: 197 (236 wartime)
- Sensors & processing systems: Mars hydrophone
- Armament: 4 × single 130 mm (5.1 in) guns; 2 × single 76.2 mm (3 in) AA guns; 2 × single 45 mm (1.8 in) AA guns; 2 × single 12.7 mm (0.50 in) AA machineguns; 2 × triple 533 mm (21 in) torpedo tubes; 60–96 mines; 2 × depth charge racks, 25 depth charges

Steregushchy (Russian: Стерегущий, lit. 'Watchful') was one of 29 Gnevny-class destroyers (officially known as Project 7) built for the Soviet Navy during the late 1930s. Completed in 1939, she was assigned to the Baltic Fleet. The ship played a minor role in the Winter War of 1939–1940 against the Finns. After the start of the German invasion of the Soviet Union (Operation Barbarossa) in June 1941, Steregushchy participated in the Gulf of Riga Campaign. The ship briefly provided naval gunfire support during the Siege of Leningrad before she was sunk by German dive bombers on 21 September. Her wreck was refloated in 1944, although the repairs were not completed until 1948. Steregushchy was broken up for scrap in 1959.

== Design and description ==
Having decided to build the large and expensive 40-knot (74 km/h; 46 mph) Leningrad-class destroyer leaders, the Soviet Navy sought Italian assistance in designing smaller and cheaper destroyers. They licensed the plans for the Folgore class and, in modifying it for their purposes, overloaded a design that was already somewhat marginally stable.

The Gnevnys had an overall length of 112.8 meters (370 ft 1 in), a beam of 10.2 meters (33 ft 6 in), and a draft of 4.8 meters (15 ft 9 in) at deep load. The ships were significantly overweight, almost 200 metric tons (197 long tons) heavier than designed, displacing 1,612 metric tons (1,587 long tons) at standard load and 2,039 metric tons (2,007 long tons) at deep load. Their crew numbered 197 officers and sailors in peacetime and 236 in wartime. The ships had a pair of geared steam turbines, each driving one propeller, rated to produce 48,000 shaft horsepower (36,000 kW) using steam from three water-tube boilers which was intended to give them a maximum speed of 37 knots (69 km/h; 43 mph). The designers had been conservative in rating the turbines and many, but not all, of the ships handily exceeded their designed speed during their sea trials. Others fell considerably short of it. Steregushchy reached 35.2 knots (65.2 km/h; 40.5 mph) during trials in 1948. Variations in fuel oil capacity meant that the range of the Gnevnys varied between 1,670 to 3,145 nautical miles (3,093 to 5,825 km; 1,922 to 3,619 mi) at 19 knots (35 km/h; 22 mph). Steregushchy herself demonstrated a range of 2,500 nmi (4,600 km; 2,900 mi) at that speed.

As built, the Gnevny-class ships mounted four 130-millimeter (5.1 in) B-13 guns in two pairs of superfiring single mounts fore and aft of the superstructure. Anti-aircraft defense was provided by a pair of 76.2-millimeter (3 in) 34-K AA guns in single mounts and a pair of 45-millimeter (1.8 in) 21-K AA guns as well as two 12.7-millimeter (0.50 in) DK or DShK machine guns. They carried six 533 mm (21.0 in) torpedo tubes in two rotating triple mounts; each tube was provided with a reload. The ships could also carry a maximum of either 60 or 95 mines and 25 depth charges. They were fitted with a set of Mars hydrophones for anti-submarine work, although they were useless at speeds over 3 knots (5.6 km/h; 3.5 mph). The ships were equipped with two K-1 paravanes intended to destroy mines and a pair of depth-charge throwers.

== Construction and service ==
Built in Leningrad's Shipyard No. 190 (Zhdanov) as yard number 516, Steregushchy was laid down on 12 August 1936 and launched on 18 June 1938. The ship was completed on 30 October 1939. and assigned to the Baltic Fleet. After the Winter War began on 30 November, she bombarded Finnish coastal defense positions on Saarenpää Island, part of the Beryozovye Islands, on 10 and 18–19 December, in conjunction with other ships.

When the Germans invaded the Soviet Union on 22 June 1941, Steregushchy was assigned to the 1st Destroyer Division of the Light Forces Detachment, based in Ust-Dvinsk, Latvia. The following day the division, the light cruiser Maxim Gorky, Steregushchy and her sisters Gordy and Gnevny, was tasked with covering minelaying operations at the mouth of the Gulf of Finland. They entered a German minefield 16 to 18 nautical miles (30 to 33 km; 18 to 21 mi) northwest of Tahkuna Lighthouse and Maxim Gorky had her bow blown off by a mine. After Steregushchy detonated two mines with her paravanes that knocked out one of her turbines, she accompanied Maxim Gorky to Tallinn, Estonia. On 2 July the destroyer helped to lay a minefield near Gogland Island. Steregushchy participated in an unsuccessful attack on a group of German landing craft off the mouth of the Daugava River on 13 July. Two days later, the ship was attacked by German bombers in the Väike Strait between Muhu and Saaremaa Islands. Shockwaves from four near misses dimpled plates in her hull, but caused no significant damage.

Under the flag of Light Forces detachment commander Kontr-admiral (Rear Admiral) Valentin Drozd, she and the destroyer Serdity covered minelaying by the guard ships Tucha and Sneg on 18 July. By 14:00 of that day they returned to the Kübasaar roadstead near Saaremaa, but quickly turned back after receiving a message that a German convoy had been spotted. Due a lack of coordination with Soviet Naval Aviation, both destroyers came under friendly air attack and at 15:31 a bomb dropped by a Tupolev SB bomber exploded close to Serdity, knocking out a boiler and both rangefinders in the conning tower. Steregushchy, which escaped unscathed, engaged the German convoy escorts, but was only joined by Serdity at 17:24 after they had lost sight of the convoy.

On 11 August, Steregushchy was one of the escorts for the passenger ship SS Vyacheslav Molotov as she steamed from Tallinn to Kronstadt when they entered a minefield. The destroyer had one of her fuel tanks flooded when a mine detonated in her starboard paravane. After the transport was damaged by a mine off Gogland, she was towed to Kronstadt by Steregushchy. After repairs, the ship supported the defenders of Leningrad with 350 shells from her main guns. On 21 September, she was attacked by Junkers Ju 87 Stuka dive bombers of StG 2. Hit three times, the bombs disabled one engine and quickly flooded the aft boiler room. Her captain took her into shallow water where she capsized to starboard, 15 minutes after being hit. A single 130 mm gun and some parts were salvaged by divers in October to repair the destroyer Strashny. The wreck was refloated in June 1944 and it was drydocked on 20 July for repairs that lasted until 1948. Steregushchy was stricken from the Navy List on 28 January 1958 and scrapped the following year.

== Sources ==
- Balakin, Sergey (2007). Легендарные "семёрки" Эсминцы "сталинской" серии [Legendary Sevens: Stalin's destroyer series] (in Russian). Moscow: Yauza/Eksmo. ISBN 978-5-699-23784-5.
- Berezhnoy, Sergey (2002). Крейсера и миноносцы. Справочник [Guide to Cruisers and Destroyers] (in Russian). Moscow: Voenizdat. ISBN 5-203-01780-8.
- Budzbon, Przemysaw (1980). "Soviet Union". In Chesneau, Roger (ed.). Conway's All the World's Fighting Ships 1922–1946. Greenwich, UK: Conway Maritime Press. pp. 318–346. ISBN 0-85177-146-7.
- Hill, Alexander (2018). Soviet Destroyers of World War II. New Vanguard. Vol. 256. Oxford, UK: Osprey Publishing. ISBN 978-1-4728-2256-7.
- Platonov, Andrey V. (2002). Энциклопедия советских надводных кораблей 1941–1945 [Encyclopedia of Soviet Surface Ships 1941–1945] (in Russian). Saint Petersburg: Poligon. ISBN 5-89173-178-9.
- Rohwer, Jürgen (2005). Chronology of the War at Sea 1939–1945: The Naval History of World War Two (Third Revised ed.). Annapolis, Maryland: Naval Institute Press. ISBN 1-59114-119-2.
- Rohwer, Jürgen & Monakov, Mikhail S. (2001). Stalin's Ocean-Going Fleet. London: Frank Cass. ISBN 0-7146-4895-7.
- Yakubov, Vladimir & Worth, Richard (2008). "The Soviet Project 7/7U Destroyers". In Jordan, John & Dent, Stephen (eds.). Warship 2008. London: Conway. pp. 99–114. ISBN 978-1-84486-062-3.
