= Soviet destroyer Strashny =

Soviet destroyer

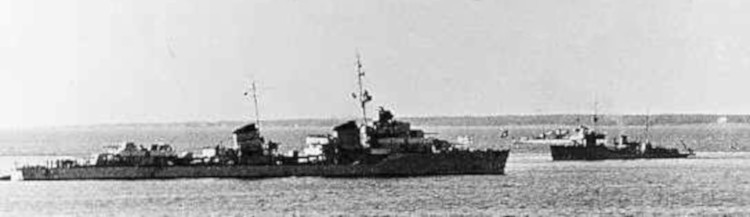
- An unidentified Storozhevoy-class destroyer in the Black Sea

History

Soviet Union
- Name: Strashny (Страшный (Terrible))
- Ordered: 2nd Five-Year Plan
- Builder: Shipyard No. 190 (Zhdanov)
- Yard number: 519
- Laid down: 31 March 1938
- Launched: 8 April 1939
- Commissioned: 22 June 1941
- Renamed: UTS-18, 18 April 1958
- Reclassified: As a stationary training ship, 18 April 1958
- Stricken: 12 January 1960
- Fate: Scrapped, 12 January 1960

General characteristics (Storozhevoy, 1941)
- Class & type: Storozhevoy-class destroyer
- Displacement: 1,727 t (1,700 long tons) (standard); 2,279 t (2,243 long tons) (full load)
- Length: 112.5 m (369 ft 1 in) (o/a)
- Beam: 10.2 m (33 ft 6 in)
- Draft: 3.98 m (13 ft 1 in)
- Installed power: 4 water-tube boilers; 54,000 shp (40,000 kW) (trials)
- Propulsion: 2 shafts, 2 steam turbine sets
- Speed: 40.3 knots (74.6 km/h; 46.4 mph) (trials)
- Endurance: 2,700 nmi (5,000 km; 3,100 mi) at 19 knots (35 km/h; 22 mph)
- Complement: 207 (271 wartime)
- Sensors & processing systems: Mars hydrophones
- Armament: 4 × single 130 mm (5.1 in) guns; 2 × single 76.2 mm (3 in) AA guns; 3 × single 45 mm (1.8 in) AA guns; 4 × single 12.7 mm (0.50 in) DK or DShK machine guns; 2 × triple 533 mm (21 in) torpedo tubes; 58–96 mines; 30 depth charges

Strashny (Russian: Страшный, lit. 'Terrible') was one of 18 Storozhevoy-class destroyers (officially known as Project 7U) built for the Soviet Navy during the late 1930s. Although she began construction as a Project 7 Gnevny-class destroyer, Strashny was completed in 1941 to the modified Project 7U design.

Accepted from the shipyard on the day that the German invasion of the Soviet Union (Operation Barbarossa) began in June 1941, Strashny was rushed into service for operations in the Gulf of Riga. While returning to Tallinn, Estonia, in mid-July after suffering bomb damage, her bow was severely damaged by a mine that took her out of the war for several months. Towed to Soviet naval bases, the destroyer was repaired during the Siege of Leningrad by taking a bow from an unfinished Project 30 destroyer. Returning to service in April 1942, Strashny bombarded Axis positions during the final months of the siege and in the Vyborg–Petrozavodsk Offensive. Postwar, she continued to serve in the Baltic and was briefly converted to an unarmed stationary training ship before being broken up for scrap in 1960.

== Design and description ==
Originally built as a Gnevny-class ship, Strashny and her sister ships were completed to the modified Project 7U design after Joseph Stalin, General Secretary of the Communist Party of the Soviet Union, ordered that the latter be built with their boilers arranged en echelon, instead of linked as in the Gnevnys, so that a ship could still move with one or two boilers disabled.

Like the Gnevnys, the Project 7U destroyers had an overall length of 112.5 meters (369 ft 1 in) and a beam of 10.2 meters (33 ft 6 in), but they had a reduced draft of 3.98 meters (13 ft 1 in) at deep load. The ships were slightly overweight, displacing 1,727 metric tons (1,700 long tons) at standard load and 2,279 metric tons (2,243 long tons) at deep load. The crew complement of the Storozhevoy class numbered 207 in peacetime, but this increased to 271 in wartime, as more personnel were needed to operate additional equipment. Each ship had a pair of geared steam turbines, each driving one propeller, rated to produce 54,000 shaft horsepower (40,000 kW) using steam from four water-tube boilers, which the designers expected would exceed the 37-knot (69 km/h; 43 mph) speed of the Project 7s because there was additional steam available. Strashny herself reached 39.6 knots (73.3 km/h; 45.6 mph) during her sea trials in 1941. Variations in fuel oil capacity meant that the range of the Project 7Us varied from 1,380 to 2,700 nautical miles (2,560 to 5,000 km; 1,590 to 3,110 mi) at 19 knots (35 km/h; 22 mph).

The Project 7U-class ships mounted four 130-millimeter (5.1 in) B-13 guns in two pairs of superfiring single mounts fore and aft of the superstructure. Anti-aircraft defense was provided by a pair of 76.2-millimeter (3 in) 34-K AA guns in single mounts and three 45-millimeter (1.8 in) 21-K AA guns, as well as four 12.7-millimeter (0.50 in) DK or DShK machine guns. They carried six 533 mm (21.0 in) torpedo tubes in two rotating triple mounts amidships. The ships could also carry a maximum of 58 to 96 mines and 30 depth charges. They were fitted with a set of Mars hydrophones for anti-submarine work, although these were useless at speeds over 3 knots (5.6 km/h; 3.5 mph).

=== Modifications ===
In 1944–1945, Strashny exchanged both of her 21-K mounts for six 37-millimeter (1.5 in) 70-K AA guns in single mounts and an additional 34-K mount. By the end of the war, she had received a Lend-Lease British Type 291 search radar and a British Type 128 ASDIC system. After the war, all of her AA guns were replaced by eight water-cooled V-11M versions of the 70-K gun in twin mounts.

== Construction and World War II ==
Strashny was laid down in Shipyard No. 190 (Zhdanov) in Leningrad with the yard number 519 on 26 August 1936 as a Gnevny-class destroyer. She was relaid down as a Project 7U destroyer on 31 March 1938 and launched on 8 April 1939. The destroyer began her sea trials in November 1940 but was forced to postpone them to May 1941 due to ice. Her guns were tested on 16 June, and she was accepted on 22 June, the day that Operation Barbarossa, the German invasion of the Soviet Union, began. Four days later, the destroyer fired her first shots of the war when her anti-aircraft gunners defended the ship against a German air raid on the roadstead of Tallinn. After an accelerated course of combat training, Strashny joined the 4th Destroyer Division of the Baltic Fleet. With her sisters Svirepy and Smely, she participated in operations in the Gulf of Riga. The destroyer was lightly damaged by near misses from German bombs on 13 July, which temporarily knocked out two boilers and a turbogenerator. Strashny escaped mostly unscathed from an air raid off Ruhnu on the next day, although concussion from near misses knocked out her main compass; her captain claimed her gunners shot down a pair of Junkers Ju 88 bombers. Bomb hits during a 15 July raid killed seven crew members and wounded 22, although the destroyer's anti-aircraft gunners claimed a Ju 88 downed. Bomb splinters started a fire in a shell magazine, which was extinguished, and holed her hull in multiple places, puncturing several oil tanks and knocking out power for her radio and electric navigation devices.

Along with the old destroyer Engels and an oil tanker, Strashny made for Tallinn for repairs, but early on 16 July near Cape Pakri she struck a mine that turned her forecastle into a mass of twisted metal and nearly severed the bow section, in addition to flooding forward compartments and knocking out power and steering. Eleven men were killed and seven more wounded by the explosion, which caused the destroyer to list to port. Despite the failure of a pump and burst fire mains, her crew managed to keep the ship afloat, and off Cape Surop she was taken under tow by a tugboat. The wounded were also transferred to submarine chasers and the minesweeper Bugel before Strashny was drydocked at Tallinn on 18 July. After the bow wreckage was removed, the destroyer left Tallinn under tow with a convoy on 31 July, soon arriving in Kronstadt. Her repair was delayed by a labor shortage, and she entered a floating dock on 8 August, being towed to the Zhdanov Shipyard while in the latter during the night of 9–10 August. After the shipyard became a target of German artillery fire, the floating dock with Strashny was towed to the Baltic Shipyard on 14 September, which took over the repairs. She was fitted with the bow of an unfinished Ognevoy-class destroyer in November, and a replacement 130 mm gun and capstan for the new bow were salvaged by divers from the sunken destroyer Steregushchy. Strashny was taken out of drydock and moored at the shipyard for the final phase of her repairs.

The Siege of Leningrad further delayed the return of the destroyer to service, bringing with it shortages of manpower and supplies. Decreasing rations for the shipyard workers meant that they could no longer work and resulted in the completion of the repairs by her own crew, allowing Strashny to return to the fleet on 15 April 1942. Following combat training during May and June, she used her 130 mm guns to bombard Axis targets on 26 June with 20 shells, with Baltic Fleet commander Vitse-admiral Valentin Drozd commending her gunners. After relocating to Kronstadt on 11 July, the crew of the destroyer conducted further maintenance to prepare her for combat. Winter repairs between 2 January and 6 March 1943 were carried out entirely by her own crew. To keep them in practice, her gunners were temporarily seconded to her sister Strogy on the Neva River, aboard which they participated in twelve bombardments in support of ground troops, expending 168 main-gun shells. After further repairs of her guns and fire control devices, Strashny test-fired her guns against the Petergof pier and German positions at Strelna, expending 26 high-explosive rounds, after which she was included in the Kronstadt defenses. The destroyer moved from the Peter Canal to Kabotazhna Havan on 1 July, where her gunners continued training, expending 3,600 rounds from her 45 mm guns during the summer.

With her sister Silny, Strashny bombarded German positions at Sashino on 26 July, firing eighteen shells, correcting her fire with the aid of the Oranienbaum observation post. She again conducted bombardments on 18 September and 8 November, although firing only two shells in the latter. From September her crew began preparations for winter, docking between 21 and 25 October. Work on the reinforcement of the destroyer's hull began in November, and for the January Leningrad–Novgorod Offensive Strashny and Silny joined the fleet's 1st Shock Artillery Group. Conducting a dozen bombardments between 14 and 19 January in support of the Krasnoye Selo–Ropsha Offensive, the destroyer fired 160 shells from her 130 mm guns. She saw her last combat during the Vyborg–Petrozavodsk Offensive, making seven bombardments between 10 and 11 June, firing one hundred thirty-nine 130 mm shells; her shells were corrected by an observation post on the shore.

== Postwar ==
After the end of the war, Strashny became part of the 8th Fleet when the Baltic Fleet was split between 25 February 1946 and 4 January 1956. She was refitted and modernized at Neptun Werft in Rostock, East Germany, between 10 July 1947 and 10 January 1953. On 18 April 1958 she was disarmed and reclassified as a stationary training ship UTS-83 before being removed from the navy list on 12 January 1960 in preparation to be scrapped. Her crew was disbanded soon afterwards on 18 February.

== Sources ==
- Balakin, Sergey (2007). Легендарные "семёрки" Эсминцы "сталинской" серии [Legendary Sevens: Stalin's Destroyer Series] (in Russian). Moscow: Yauza/Eksmo. ISBN 978-5-699-23784-5.
- Berezhnoy, Sergey (2002). Крейсера и миноносцы. Справочник [Guide to Cruisers and Destroyers] (in Russian). Moscow: Voenizdat. ISBN 5-203-01780-8.
- Hill, Alexander (2018). Soviet Destroyers of World War II. New Vanguard. Vol. 256. Oxford, UK: Osprey Publishing. ISBN 978-1-4728-2256-7.
- Platonov, Andrey V. (2002). Энциклопедия советских надводных кораблей 1941–1945 [Encyclopedia of Soviet Surface Ships 1941–1945] (in Russian). Saint Petersburg: Poligon. ISBN 5-89173-178-9.
- Rohwer, Jürgen & Monakov, Mikhail S. (2001). Stalin's Ocean-Going Fleet. London: Frank Cass. ISBN 0-7146-4895-7.
- Yakubov, Vladimir & Worth, Richard (2008). "The Soviet Project 7/7U Destroyers". In Jordan, John & Dent, Stephen (eds.). Warship 2008. London: Conway. pp. 99–114. ISBN 978-1-84486-062-3.
