= Soviet destroyer Smely (1939) =

Soviet Storozhevoy-class destroyer

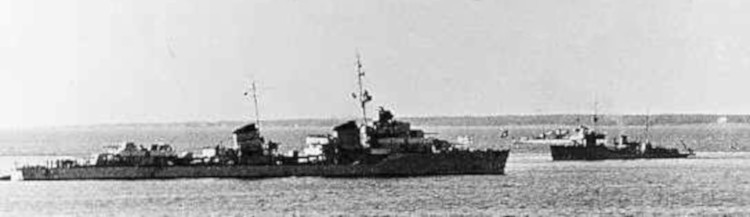
- An unidentified Storozhevoy-class destroyer in the Black Sea

History

Soviet Union
- Name: Smely (Смелый (Valiant))
- Ordered: 2nd Five-Year Plan
- Builder: Shipyard No. 190 (Zhdanov), Leningrad
- Yard number: 521
- Laid down: March 1938
- Launched: 30 April 1939
- Completed: 31 May 1941
- Commissioned: 18 June 1941
- Fate: Mined and scuttled, 27 July 1941

General characteristics (Storozhevoy, 1941)
- Class & type: Storozhevoy-class destroyer
- Displacement: 1,727 t (1,700 long tons) (standard); 2,279 t (2,243 long tons) (full load)
- Length: 112.5 m (369 ft 1 in) (o/a)
- Beam: 10.2 m (33 ft 6 in)
- Draft: 3.98 m (13 ft 1 in)
- Installed power: 4 water-tube boilers; 54,000 shp (40,000 kW) (trials)
- Propulsion: 2 shafts, 2 steam turbine sets
- Speed: 38 knots (70 km/h; 44 mph)
- Endurance: 1,800 nmi (3,300 km; 2,100 mi) at 19 knots (35 km/h; 22 mph)
- Complement: 207 (271 wartime)
- Sensors & processing systems: Mars hydrophones
- Armament: 4 × single 130 mm (5.1 in) guns; 2 × single 76.2 mm (3 in) AA guns; 3 × single 45 mm (1.8 in) AA guns; 4 × single 12.7 mm (0.50 in) DK or DShK machine guns; 2 × triple 533 mm (21 in) torpedo tubes; 58–96 mines; 30 depth charges

Smely (Russian: Смелый, lit. 'Valiant') was one of 18 Storozhevoy-class destroyers (officially known as Project 7U) built for the Soviet Navy during the late 1930s. Although she began construction as a Project 7 Gnevny-class destroyer, Smely was completed in 1941 to the modified Project 7U design.

Serving with the Baltic Fleet, she served as an escort after the start of the German invasion of the Soviet Union (Operation Barbarossa) in June 1941. While covering minelaying operations in the Irbe Strait, she was mined on 27 July. After the failure of attempts to save her, Smely was sunk by a torpedo from an accompanying motor torpedo boat.

== Design ==
Originally built as a Gnevny-class ship, Smely and her sister ships were completed to the modified Project 7U design after Joseph Stalin, General Secretary of the Communist Party of the Soviet Union, ordered that the latter be built with their boilers arranged en echelon, instead of linked as in the Gnevnys, so that a ship could still move with one or two boilers disabled.

Like the Gnevnys, the Project 7U destroyers had an overall length of 112.5 meters (369 ft 1 in) and a beam of 10.2 meters (33 ft 6 in), but they had a reduced draft of 3.98 meters (13 ft 1 in) at deep load. The ships were slightly overweight, displacing 1,727 metric tons (1,700 long tons) at standard load and 2,279 metric tons (2,243 long tons) at deep load. The crew complement of the Storozhevoy class numbered 207 in peacetime, but this increased to 271 in wartime, as more personnel were needed to operate additional equipment. Each ship had a pair of geared steam turbines, each driving one propeller, rated to produce 54,000 shaft horsepower (40,000 kW) using steam from four water-tube boilers, which the designers expected would exceed the 37-knot (69 km/h; 43 mph) speed of the Project 7s because there was additional steam available. Some fell short of it, although specific figures for most individual ships have not survived. Variations in fuel oil capacity meant that the range of the Project 7Us varied from 1,380 to 2,700 nautical miles (2,560 to 5,000 km; 1,590 to 3,110 mi) at 19 knots (35 km/h; 22 mph).

The ships mounted four 130-millimeter (5.1 in) B-13 guns in two pairs of superfiring single mounts fore and aft of the superstructure. Anti-aircraft defense was provided by a pair of 76.2-millimeter (3 in) 34-K AA guns in single mounts and three 45-millimeter (1.8 in) 21-K AA guns, as well as four 12.7-millimeter (0.50 in) DK or DShK machine guns. They carried six 533 mm (21.0 in) torpedo tubes in two rotating triple mounts amidships. The ships could also carry a maximum of 58 to 96 mines and 30 depth charges. They were fitted with a set of Mars hydrophones for anti-submarine work, although these were useless at speeds over 3 knots (5.6 km/h; 3.5 mph).

== Construction and World War II ==
Smely was laid down in Shipyard No. 190 (Zhdanov) in Leningrad with the yard number 521 on 26 October 1936 as a Gnevny-class destroyer. She was relaid down as a Project 7U destroyer in March 1938, and launched on 30 April 1939. Completed on 31 May 1941, she did not officially join the Baltic Fleet until 18 June, when the Soviet naval jack was raised aboard her. With her sister Surovy she joined the 5th Destroyer Division of the fleet.

With the 22 June beginning of Operation Barbarossa, the German invasion of the Soviet Union, Smely moved to Hanko, under Finnish attack, to escort the passenger liner Iosif Stalin back to Tallinn. On the next day, while approaching Suurupi Strait, she was lightly damaged by the explosion of a mine caught by her paravanes. After a week of repairs, she escorted the battleship Oktyabrskaya Revolutsiya from Tallinn to Kronstadt with her sisters Svirepy and Strashny between 1 and 2 July, before returning to Tallinn. From 13 July, again with Svirepy and Strashny, she operated in Moonsund and the Gulf of Riga, fighting off repeated German air attacks. On 23 July, while dodging another air attack, her screws contacted a shoal in Kassar Bay, which knocked the left shaft out of alignment, reducing her speed to 14 knots.

On the night of 26–27 July, she covered the minelayer Surop, guard ship Buran, and minesweeper Fugas in minelaying operations in the southern part of the Irbe Strait. At 02:49 on 27 July Smely struck a mine on her starboard side. The explosion cracked the keel beneath her forward superstructure, heavily damaged her bow, blew off the forecastle and caused extensive flooding in the bow. 20 crewmembers were killed by the explosion and 30 injured. Within fifteen minutes most of the survivors were taken off by Fugas, leaving a party of seven officers and ten sailors to attach a tow. Buran unsuccessfully attempted to tow her for more than an hour and a half, but was thwarted when the bow collapsed and grounded on the seabed. The attempts to save the ship were abandoned when periscopes and a German reconnaissance aircraft were sighted, and the chief of staff of the Light Forces Detachment, aboard Buran, ordered the ship to be abandoned. The destroyer was struck by a torpedo launched by the motor torpedo boat TKA-73, and sank within twenty minutes. As no mines had been laid at the site of the sinking, it was thought to have been a result of a torpedoing by a German submarine, although none of the latter were in the vicinity at the time. Recent Russian sources consider the mine to have come from those dropped by her sisters Silny and Serdity during their engagement of 6 July. (Note: Naval historian Jurgen Rohwer states that she was torpedoed by the S-boat S-54.)

Her captain was subsequently demoted and sent to the land front for not "taking energetic action" to save the ship. The destroyer was officially removed from the Soviet Navy on 31 August.

== Sources ==
- Balakin, Sergey (2007). Легендарные "семёрки" Эсминцы "сталинской" серии [Legendary Sevens: Stalin's Destroyer Series] (in Russian). Yauza/Eksmo. ISBN 978-5-699-23784-5.
- Berezhnoy, Sergey (2002). Крейсера и миноносцы. Справочник [Guide to Cruisers and Destroyers] (in Russian). Voenizdat. ISBN 5-203-01780-8.
- Hill, Alexander (2018). Soviet Destroyers of World War II. New Vanguard. Vol. 256. Osprey Publishing. ISBN 978-1-4728-2256-7.
- Platonov, Andrey (2002). Энциклопедия советских надводных кораблей 1941–1945 [Encyclopedia of Soviet Surface Ships 1941–1945] (in Russian). Saint Petersburg: Poligon. ISBN 5-89173-178-9.
- Rohwer, Jürgen (2005). Chronology of the War at Sea 1939–1945: The Naval History of World War Two (Third Revised ed.). Naval Institute Press. ISBN 1-59114-119-2.
- Rohwer, Jürgen & Monakov, Mikhail S. (2001). Stalin's Ocean-Going Fleet. Frank Cass. ISBN 0-7146-4895-7.
- Yakubov, Vladimir & Worth, Richard (2008). "The Soviet Project 7/7U Destroyers". In Jordan, John & Dent, Stephen (eds.). Warship 2008. Conway. pp. 99–114. ISBN 978-1-84486-062-3.
