= Soviet destroyer Grozyashchy =

Destroyer of the Soviet Navy

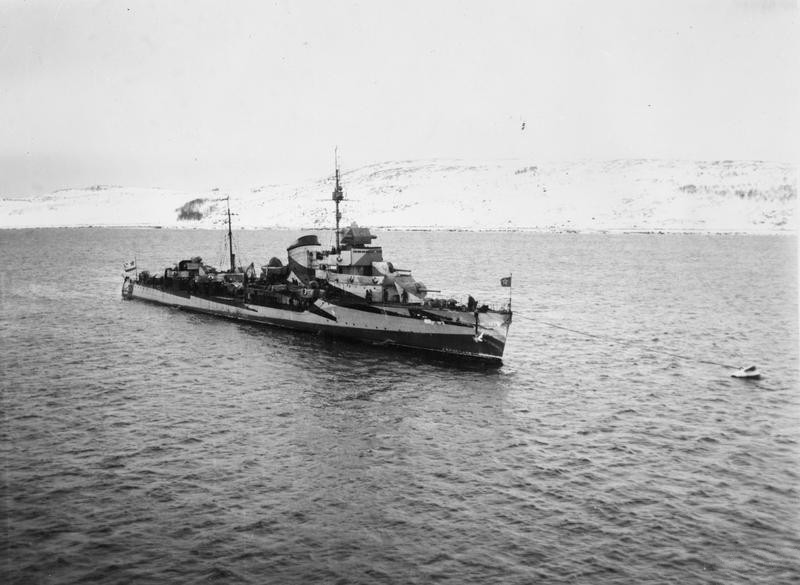
- Aerial view of sister ship Razumny, March 1944

History

Soviet Union
- Name: Grozyashchy (Грозящий (Threatening))
- Ordered: 2nd Five-Year Plan
- Builder: Shipyard No. 190 (Zhdanov), Leningrad; Shipyard No. 189 (Ordzhonikidze), Leningrad
- Laid down: 18 June 1936
- Launched: 5 January 1937
- Completed: 17 September 1939
- Reclassified: As a target ship, 18 April 1958
- Stricken: 17 February 1956
- Fate: Scrapped after 24 August 1953

General characteristics (Gnevny as completed, 1938)
- Class & type: Gnevny-class destroyer
- Displacement: 1,612 t (1,587 long tons) (standard)
- Length: 112.8 m (370 ft 1 in) (o/a)
- Beam: 10.2 m (33 ft 6 in)
- Draft: 4.8 m (15 ft 9 in)
- Installed power: 3 water-tube boilers; 48,000 shp (36,000 kW)
- Propulsion: 2 shafts; 2 geared steam turbines
- Speed: 38 knots (70 km/h; 44 mph)
- Range: 2,720 nmi (5,040 km; 3,130 mi) at 19 knots (35 km/h; 22 mph)
- Complement: 197 (236 wartime)
- Sensors & processing systems: Mars hydrophone
- Armament: 4 × single 130 mm (5.1 in) guns; 2 × single 76.2 mm (3 in) AA guns; 2 × single 45 mm (1.8 in) AA guns; 2 × single 12.7 mm (0.50 in) AA machineguns; 2 × triple 533 mm (21 in) torpedo tubes; 60–96 mines; 2 × depth charge racks, 25 depth charges

Grozyashchy (Russian: Грозящий, lit. 'Threatening') was one of 29 Gnevny-class destroyers (officially known as Project 7) built for the Soviet Navy during the late 1930s. Completed in 1939, she was assigned to the Baltic Fleet and played a minor role in the Winter War of 1939–1940 against the Finns. After the start of the German invasion of the Soviet Union (Operation Barbarossa) in June 1941, Grozyashchy participated in the Gulf of Riga Campaign and laid minefields in the Gulf of Finland. She was badly damaged by a mine in July and was under repair for over a month. The ship was crippled by German bombs in late September and did not become operational for almost a year. Grozyashchy provided naval gunfire support in 1944 for the Leningrad–Novgorod Offensive.

The ship was scheduled to be modernized in 1952, but it had to be cancelled the following year as her poor condition made it uneconomical and she was later scrapped.

== Design and description ==
Having decided to build the large and expensive 40-knot (74 km/h; 46 mph) Leningrad-class destroyer leaders, the Soviet Navy sought Italian assistance in designing smaller and cheaper destroyers. They licensed the plans for the Folgore class and, in modifying it for their purposes, overloaded a design that was already somewhat marginally stable.

The Gnevnys had an overall length of 112.8 meters (370 ft 1 in), a beam of 10.2 meters (33 ft 6 in), and a draft of 4.8 meters (15 ft 9 in) at deep load. The ships were significantly overweight, almost 200 metric tons (197 long tons) heavier than designed, displacing 1,612 metric tons (1,587 long tons) at standard load and 2,039 metric tons (2,007 long tons) at deep load. Their crew numbered 197 officers and sailors in peacetime and 236 in wartime. The ships had a pair of geared steam turbines, each driving one propeller, rated to produce 48,000 shaft horsepower (36,000 kW) using steam from three water-tube boilers which was intended to give them a maximum speed of 37 knots (69 km/h; 43 mph). The designers had been conservative in rating the turbines and many, but not all, of the ships handily exceeded their designed speed during their sea trials. Others fell considerably short of it. Grozyashchy reached 39.4 knots (73.0 km/h; 45.3 mph) from 53,000 shp (40,000 kW) during trials in 1944. Variations in fuel oil capacity meant that the range of the Gnevnys varied between 1,670 to 3,145 nautical miles (3,093 to 5,825 km; 1,922 to 3,619 mi) at 19 knots (35 km/h; 22 mph). Grozyashchy herself demonstrated a range of 2,800 nmi (5,200 km; 3,200 mi) at that speed.

As built, the Gnevny-class ships mounted four 130-millimeter (5.1 in) B-13 guns in two pairs of superfiring single mounts fore and aft of the superstructure. Anti-aircraft defense was provided by a pair of 76.2-millimeter (3 in) 34-K AA guns in single mounts and a pair of 45-millimeter (1.8 in) 21-K AA guns as well as two 12.7-millimeter (0.50 in) DK or DShK machine guns. They carried six 533 mm (21.0 in) torpedo tubes in two rotating triple mounts; each tube was provided with a reload. The ships could also carry a maximum of either 60 or 95 mines and 25 depth charges. They were fitted with a set of Mars hydrophones for anti-submarine work, although they were useless at speeds over 3 knots (5.6 km/h; 3.5 mph). The ships were equipped with two K-1 paravanes intended to destroy mines and a pair of depth-charge throwers.

=== Modifications ===
While under repair in July–September 1941, Grozyashchy received a pair of BMB-1 depth-charge throwers and a degaussing coil. By 1943 the destroyer's anti-aircraft armament consisted of three 34-K mounts, four 37-millimeter (1.5 in) 70-K AA guns in single mounts, two twin-gun mounts for Lend-Lease, water-cooled 12.7 mm Colt-Browning machine guns and two single mounts for DK machine guns. Two additional 70-K guns were received in 1944. By the end of the war, she had received a British ASDIC system and an early-warning radar of unknown type. After the war, all of her AA guns were replaced by eight water-cooled V-11M versions of the 70-K gun in twin mounts.

== Construction and service ==
Grozyashchy was built in Leningrad's Shipyard No. 190 (Zhdanov) as yard number 513 where the ship was laid down on 18 June 1936 and launched on 5 January 1937. After she was launched, she was towed across the River Neva to be finished by Shipyard No. 189 (Ordzhonikidze) where she was given yard number 301, and was completed on 17 September 1939. Assigned to the Baltic Fleet, she bombarded Finnish fortifications on Utö in Åland on 14 December 1939 during the Winter War together with her sister ship Gnevny Grozyashchy also captured the Finnish merchant ship SS Aiva during the war.

When Operation Barbarossa, the German invasion of the Soviet Union, began on 22 June 1941, the destroyer was based in Ust-Dvinsk, Latvia, as part of the 1st Destroyer Division of the fleet's Light Forces Detachment. She participated in the defense of the Gulf of Riga, laying minefields in the Irben Straits during the nights of 24/25 and 26/27 June. The ship sailed to Kuivastu, Estonia, on the 27th and then helped to escort Kirov through the Moonsund archipelago to Tallinn, Estonia, three days later as the Soviets evacuated their forces from the Gulf of Riga. Grozyashchy participated in an unsuccessful attack on a group of German landing craft off the mouth of the Daugava River on 13 July. After laying a minefield in the Gulf of Finland on 21 July, a mine detonated in one of her paravanes. The explosion flooded part of her double bottom, the fire-control compartment and the forward boiler room. With a badly damaged forward hull, Grozyashchy was forced to steam in reverse for Tallinn. After temporary repairs, she steamed to Kronstadt on 24 July for repairs that lasted until 2 September.

On 9 September the ship fired 86 rounds from her 130 mm guns in support of the defenders of the Oranienbaum Bridgehead. On 10 and 12 September, Grozyashchy laid 54 mines and 90 mine defenders in Luga Bay and nearby areas. On the latter day, her propellers were damaged after they struck a reef and had to go to Kronstadt for repairs. On 22–23 September the ship was hit three times by German bombs which started a large fire that had to be put out by flooding the drydock that she was in. Grozyashchy was further damaged by splinters from artillery shells detonating in the dock on 29 September. The cumulative effects knocked out her steering, put her aft-most 130 mm gun out of action and damaged much of her machinery in addition to killing seven crewmen and injuring twenty others. The ship was towed to Shipyard No. 189 for repairs on 3 October.

While still under repair, Grozyashchy was slightly damaged by shell splinters on 24 April 1942. The repairs were finally completed on 1 June, although she conducted trials at Kronstadt on 13 July. The ship returned to Leningrad on 9 November and began a refit on 22 December. During the Leningrad–Novgorod Offensive, Grozyashchy fired a total of 63 main-gun shells in support of Soviet troops on 14–18 January 1944.

After the war, the destroyer was scheduled to be modernized on 24 June 1952, but her condition was so poor that it was canceled on 24 August 1953 and she was subsequently scrapped.

== Sources ==
- Balakin, Sergey (2007). Легендарные "семёрки" Эсминцы "сталинской" серии [Legendary Sevens: Stalin's destroyer series] (in Russian). Moscow: Yauza/Eksmo. ISBN 978-5-699-23784-5.
- Berezhnoy, Sergey (2002). Крейсера и миноносцы. Справочник [Guide to Cruisers and Destroyers] (in Russian). Moscow: Voenizdat. ISBN 5-203-01780-8.
- Budzbon, Przemysaw (1980). "Soviet Union". In Chesneau, Roger (ed.). Conway's All the World's Fighting Ships 1922–1946. Greenwich, UK: Conway Maritime Press. pp. 318–346. ISBN 0-85177-146-7.
- Hill, Alexander (2018). Soviet Destroyers of World War II. New Vanguard. Vol. 256. Oxford, UK: Osprey Publishing. ISBN 978-1-4728-2256-7.
- Platonov, Andrey V. (2002). Энциклопедия советских надводных кораблей 1941–1945 [Encyclopedia of Soviet Surface Ships 1941–1945] (in Russian). Saint Petersburg: Poligon. ISBN 5-89173-178-9.
- Rohwer, Jürgen (2005). Chronology of the War at Sea 1939–1945: The Naval History of World War Two (Third Revised ed.). Annapolis, Maryland: Naval Institute Press. ISBN 1-59114-119-2.
- Rohwer, Jürgen & Monakov, Mikhail S. (2001). Stalin's Ocean-Going Fleet. London: Frank Cass. ISBN 0-7146-4895-7.
- Yakubov, Vladimir & Worth, Richard (2008). "The Soviet Project 7/7U Destroyers". In Jordan, John & Dent, Stephen (eds.). Warship 2008. London: Conway. pp. 99–114. ISBN 978-1-84486-062-3.
