= Gulf of Riga campaign =

World War II naval battle

- Part of the Baltic Sea campaign of the Eastern Front of World War II
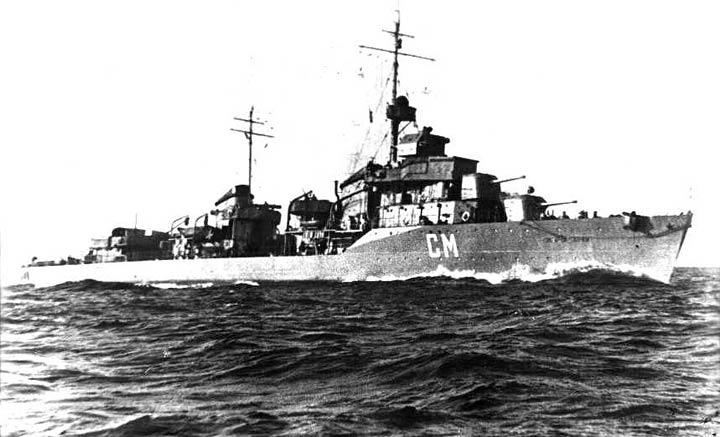
- A Soviet Storozhevoy (Project 7U)-class destroyer
| Date | 22 June 1941 – August 1941 |
| Location | Gulf of Riga |
| Result | German victory |

Belligerents
| Germany | Soviet Union |

Commanders and leaders
| (Nazi Germany) Admiral Hubert Schmundt | (Soviet Union) Admiral Vladimir Tributs |

Strength
| S-boats and minesweepers | 2 light cruisers destroyers and motor torpedo boats |

Casualties and losses
| 3 minesweepers sunk and others damaged 2 motor torpedo boats sunk 1 transport sunk and other damaged | 1 cruiser damaged 3 destroyers sunk and 1 damaged 1 minesweeper sunk 1 motor torpedo boat sunk |

The Gulf of Riga campaign was fought by the Soviet Navy against the Kriegsmarine during Operation Barbarossa in 1941.

== Background ==
During World War I, the Gulf of Riga in the Baltic Sea played a strategic role in naval warfare and was target of the German offensive during the Battle of the Gulf of Riga and Operation Albion. During World War II, after the first weeks of quick German advance alongside the Baltic coast, the Soviet Navy begun operations to clear enemy mines, lay own defensive minefields and dispatching warships (including destroyers) into the Irben Straits to harass German naval shipping to supply their forces by sea. The Soviet Navy in the Baltic Sea at the time was under command of Admiral Vladimir F. Tributs. German commander of the Baltic operations was Hubert Schmundt, who, differently from the Soviets, could only commit lighter naval units including S-boats.

== June Operations ==
Both sides laid extensive fields of mines in the Irben Straits: German operations begun on 21 June 1941 (mines laid by S-boats) and others were laid on the next days; such mines caused early damage to the light cruiser Maxim Gorky and the destroyer Gordy two days later in the Irben Straits, while her sister ship Gnevny was sunk. On 24 June it was Soviets turn to lay mines in the Irben Straits and this was accomplished by the destroyers Serdity, Stoyky and Storozhevoy, supported by the light cruiser Kirov and the destroyers Silny, Strashny, Grozyashchy and Smetlivy: over 500 mines were laid in the next two nights. Soviet mines caused the loss of German S-boats S-43 and S-106 on 26 June, the following day other losses were suffered with the sinking of minesweeper R-205 and damage to M-201, R-202, R-203, R-53 and R-63.

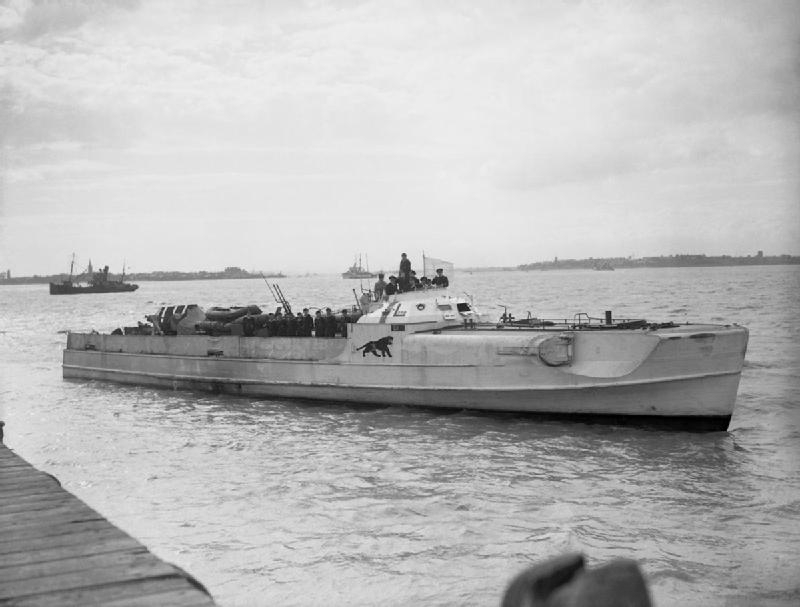
A S-boat surrendering in 1945

The first direct clash between the opposing forces occurred on 27 June, when German S-boats S-31 and S-59 torpedoed and damaged, with heavy casualties, Storozhevoy. The ship did not sink despite losing her entire bow up to the bridge and returned to service after extensive repairs only on 19 September 1943, while the destroyer Smely was torpedoed by S-54 and later scuttled by the Soviet motor torpedo boat n°73.

== July Operations ==
Soviet destroyers Serdity and Silny had a surface engagement, on 6 July near Kolka during a minelaying mission, with the German minesweeper M-31 and the larger support-ship MRS-11/Osnabruck: despite enjoying absolute superiority. Soviet ships failed to hit the enemy and Silny received a direct hit from the minesweeper (suffering four dead).

Soviet naval units attempted a first attack on a German convoy (Riga was in German hands since 3 July) on 9 July but the attack, carried out by four MO-4-class patrol boats against a group of 6 motorboats with 4 logging ships, was unsuccessful. In July Soviet mines kept on causing damage to minor German units in the Irben Straits: the minesweeper M-201 sunk and M-23 was beached, but both were later salvaged while M-3131 was lost. New Soviet mines were laid by destroyers Serdity and Silny, covered by Stoiky, Grozyashchy and Smetlivy. However Strashny suffered heavy damage by mine on 9 July. On 13 July a coordinated attack of Soviet aircraft and motor torpedo boats managed to sink a German transport and damage 2 barges and 23 minor barges off Riga. Another mixed attack was carried out on 26 July when a plane sank the German minesweeper R-169.

Soviet destroyers suffered their third loss when Serdity was hit on 18 July by Ju 88 bombers of Kampfgruppe 806, the ship was scuttled on 22 July after failed attempts to move her.

== August Operations ==
At the beginning of August, Germans were still laying mines in the Irben Straits. On 1 August, Soviet motor torpedo boats attempted an attack, covered by two destroyers, against S-boats off Cape Domesnas but they only lost the motor torpedo boat TK-122 in the process. Between 6 and 8 August, the destroyers Surovy and Statny shelled German coastal artillery batteries in the Moon Sound. On 17 August however, four Soviet motor torpedo boats attacked off Cape Domesnas again; and during the engagement the German minesweeper M-1707 Lunenburg was first shelled by Soviet ground artillery and then strayed into mines and sank.

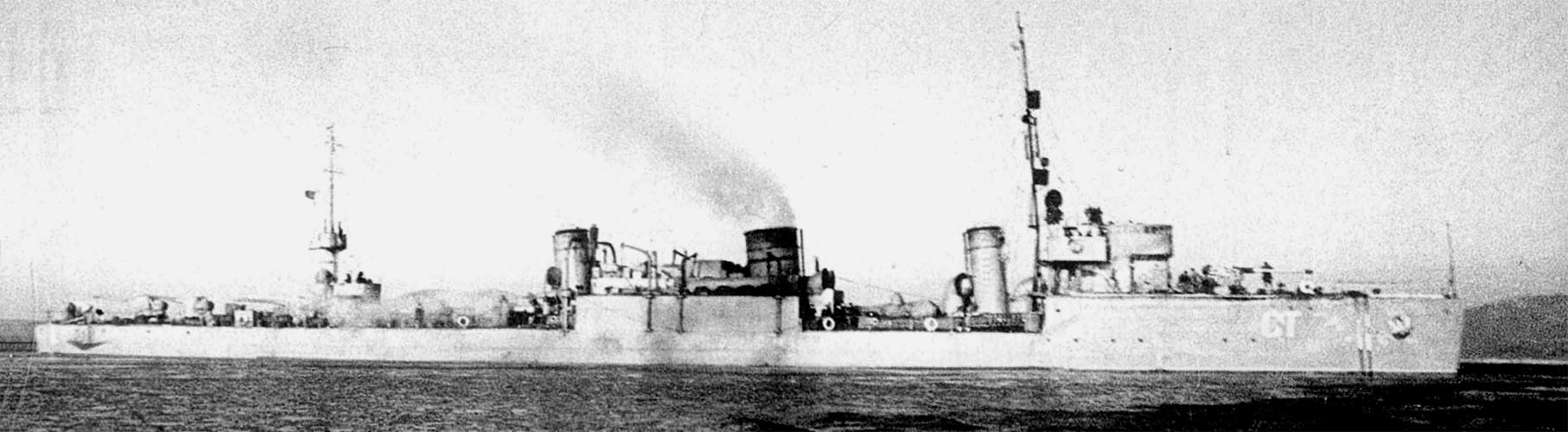
Destroyer Stalin, sister-ship of Artem

Three days later the Germans retaliated when S-58 torpedoed and sank the Soviet minesweeper T-51 Pirmunas in the Moon Sound. The final Soviet destroyer action occurred on 21 August when the destroyers Artem and Surovy made an unsuccessful attack against a convoy. They managed to force the only escort unit, the auxiliary gunboat SAT-1 Ost, to run aground (later recovered) but this prevented damages to the convoy.

== Aftermath ==
The campaign reached its peak with the fall of Riga on 3 July 1941: Soviet destroyers attacked German convoys of barges and small merchants, but failed to stop this traffic and lost three destroyers in the process. While the Soviet units retreated to Tallinn, the Germans completely swept the Soviet defensive minefields.

== See also ==
- Baltic Sea campaigns (1939–45)
- Soviet submarine Baltic Sea campaign in 1941
