= Yuri Panteleyev =

Soviet naval officer (1901–1983)

- Born: Yuri Aleksandrovich Panteleyev; 31 October [O.S. 18 October] 1901; Saint Petersburg, Russian Empire
- Died: 5 May 1983 (aged 81) Leningrad, RSFSR, Soviet Union
- Buried: Serafimovskoe Cemetery
- Allegiance: Soviet Union
- Branch: Soviet Navy
- Service years: 1918–1968
- Rank: Admiral
- Commands: Pacific Fleet
- Awards: Soviet Union: Order of Lenin; Order of the Red Banner (four times); Order of Nakhimov First Class; Order of the Patriotic War First Class; Order of the Red Banner of Labour; Order of the Red Star (three times); Foreign awards: Companion of the Order of the Bath (UK)

Yuri Aleksandrovich Panteleyev (Russian: Юрий Александрович Пантелеев; 31 October [O.S. 18 October] 1901 – 5 May 1983) was an officer of the Soviet Navy. He rose to the rank of admiral and was commander of the Pacific Fleet.

Born into the family of a Cossack ataman, Panteleyev and his father both were keen yachtsmen, living in Saint Petersburg. With the Russian Revolution in 1917 Panteleyev volunteered with a group of sailors of the Workers' and Peasants' Red Navy, and was soon given his own commands. He took part in the defence of Petrograd during the Russian Civil War, and in the suppression of the Kronstadt rebellion in 1921. Undertaking further studies and naval courses, Panteleyev specialised in navigation and served on a number of ships of the Black Sea Fleet, and then as a staff officer of the Northern Military Flotilla. After command of submarine brigades in the Black Sea, Panteleyev was appointed chief of staff of the Baltic Fleet, in anticipation of future hostilities. He served during the Soviet-Finnish War, and after the German invasion of the Soviet Union, was tasked with the Soviet evacuation of Tallinn and then took charge of the naval defence of Leningrad. Success in this area was followed with an appointment to take charge of the Volga Military Flotilla and establish a safe supply of fuel for the armies operating in the region. Having achieved this, he then was appointed commander of the White Sea military flotilla, with the important task of defending and keeping open the approaches to the Northern ports. He successfully arranged the escort and defence of the Arctic convoys, and made airfields and support available to British bombers carrying out attacks on the Tirpitz. For this service he was made a Companion of the Order of the Bath by the British.

After the war Panteleyev served in several staff positions, before being made commander of the Pacific Fleet. Towards the end of his career he maintained an interest in academic affairs, and served in several positions in the Naval Academy, including as its head. Retiring from service, he continued to write, producing several works including his memoirs. He died in 1983, and was buried in Leningrad. The navy honoured his legacy with the naming of the Udaloy-class destroyer Admiral Panteleyev.

== Family and early years ==
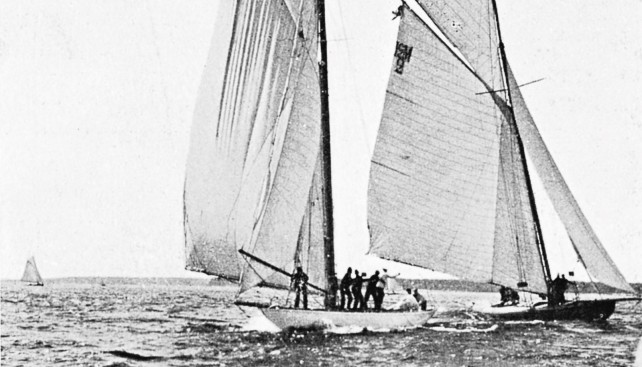
The Russian yacht Galliya II competing in the sailing competitions at the 1912 Summer Olympics. Both Yuri and his father sailed to watch the competition.

Panteleyev was born on 31 October [O.S. 18 October] 1901 in Saint Petersburg, the son of Aleksandr Panteleyev, a cinematographer. His wife, and Yuri's mother, Anna Alekseyevna, also worked at the film studios. Both Aleksandr and Yuri were keen yachtsmen. In 1912, when Yuri was eleven years old, they sailed the yacht Ruslan to Sweden to watch the Russian team competing off Stockholm in the sailing at the 1912 Summer Olympics. In 1917 Yuri graduated from the Second Saint Petersburg Gymnasium, in the last class to graduate before the revolution.

With the upheaval of the revolution, Yuri Panteleyev attended volunteer classes at local sailors' club and in March 1918 enlisted at the age of 16 with a group of sailors assigned to guard the institutions of the Workers' and Peasants' Red Navy in Petrograd. He then took a series of navigational courses, and in November 1918 he was appointed to command of the 1st Naval Education Unit, which from August 1919 guarded the mouth of the River Neva on the line between the Lakhta and Sea Canal dam on the Baltic Sea. In March 1921 he took part in the suppression of the Kronstadt rebellion, commanding a detachment of skiers made up of Komsomol members who carried out reconnaissance of the approaches to Kotlin Island, marking the way for the advancing troops. For this he and nine others of his detachment were awarded the Order of the Red Banner. Panteleyev then took the course for navigators, followed by practical experience as assistant captain on the Soviet sailing merchant ship Lauristin during a voyage to Estonia in summer 1921.

== Navigator and Black Sea officer ==
In May 1922 Panteleyev was appointed junior navigator of the battleship Marat, and advanced to senior navigator in April 1923. He was sent to Moscow in December 1923 to take further specialist courses in navigation. From December 1923 to February 1925 he studied the Higher Special Courses of the naval command staff, which included practical experience with a voyage aboard the Vorovskiy, which ended in Vladivostok on 20 November 1924, having sailed through the North Sea, past Gibraltar, through the Suez Canal, the Red Sea, the Indian Ocean, and the Strait of Malacca, visiting many of the local ports. After graduating from the Academy Panteleyev was sent to serve in the Black Sea Fleet as navigator aboard the submarine Politruk, until July 1925. He would spend the next five years serving on the Black Sea.

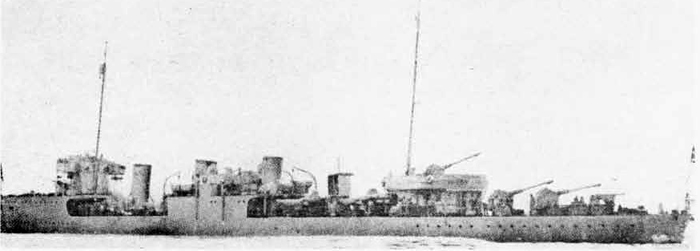
The destroyer Shaumyan, Panteleyev's ship from July 1925 to April 1926

From July 1925 to April 1926 Panteleyev was senior assistant to the commander of the destroyer Shaumyan, and then from April 1926 to December 1928 he was senior navigator of the cruiser Chervona Ukraine. His next posting, until October 1930, was an assistant to the head of the combat training department of the Black Sea Fleet. He returned to his studies in October 1930, enrolling in the Naval Academy and graduating in April 1933. Panteleyev was then appointed assistant sector chief of the Combat Training Directorate of the Naval Forces, and in June 1933 became chief of the 1st sector (operational and combat training) of the headquarters of the Northern Military Flotilla, also acting as the flotilla's chief of staff from 25 September to 21 March 1934. During this time a number of warships were transferred from the Baltic Fleet to the White Sea via the White Sea–Baltic Canal.

== To the Baltic Fleet ==
In April 1935 Panteleyev returned to the Black Sea Fleet as the commander of the 1st submarine brigade until November 1936, and then until August 1938 as commander of the 2nd submarine brigade. In summer 1938 he was transferred to the Navy Commissariat and from August 1938 to October 1939 was member, and then deputy chairman of the State Commission for the Acceptance of Ships. It was at this time that Admiral Ivan Yumashev, then commander of the Pacific Fleet, requested that Panteleyev serve as commander of his minesweeping brigade. Panteleyev agreed, but the appointment was blocked by Naval commissioner Nikolai Kuznetsov, who anticipating trouble with Finland, arranged with Stalin to appoint Panteleyev as chief of staff of the Baltic Fleet.

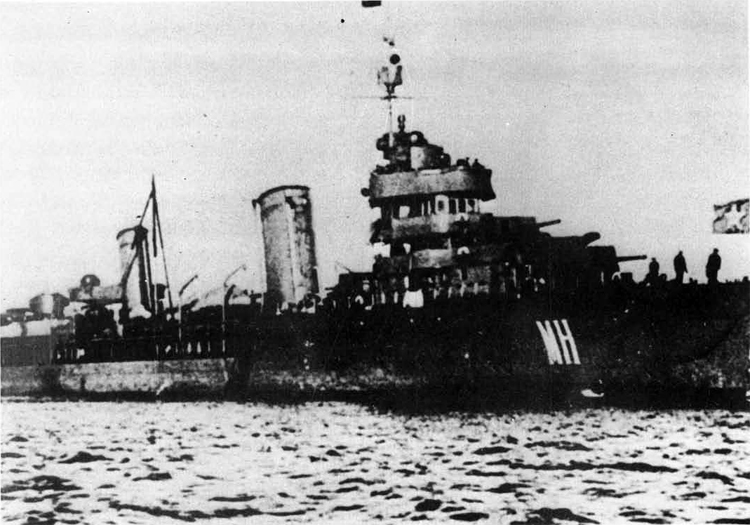
The destroyer leader Minsk, Panteleyev's ship during operations in the Gulf of Finland during the Soviet-Finnish War

In October 1939 Panteleyev became acting chief of staff of the Baltic Fleet, and in June 1940 was confirmed in post, holding this position until 29 August 1941. During the Soviet-Finnish War the Baltic Fleet deployed submarines and patrol ships in the Gulf of Finland, while carrying out air reconnaissance and providing supporting fire against fort artillery. Panteleyev personally carried out reconnaissance of the island of Kopisari, at the entrance to the port of Kotka. His detachment, consisting of the destroyer leader Minsk, two destroyers and several supporting vessels approached the island, but came under fire from a Finnish battery. The Soviets were unable to suppress the Finnish guns and had difficulty in firing on coastal targets because of a lack of spotters to observe the fall of shots. During the battle a shell fragment fell into the fur collar of Panteleyev's coat, a fragment he kept as a souvenir. Promoted to rear admiral on 4 June 1940 Panteleyev was one of the officers based at the fleet headquarters at Tallinn as the possibility of war with Nazi Germany became ever greater.

== Great Patriotic War ==
=== Defending Leningrad ===
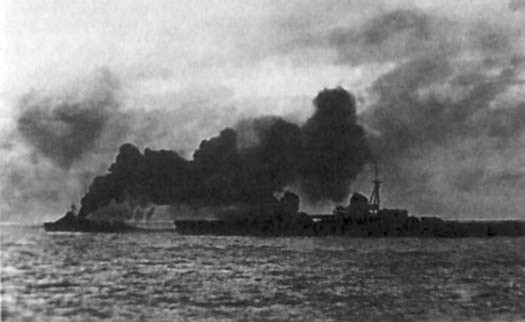
The cruiser Kirov under a smoke screen during the Soviet evacuation of Tallinn

The Navy was one of the only branches of the Soviet military to be at full readiness when the German invasion of the Soviet Union began. It had been placed at readiness No. 2 on 19 June, and at midnight on 21 June commander in chief of the navy Admiral Kuznetsov moved it to readiness No. 1. As Baltic Fleet chief of staff, Panteleyev was heavily involved in bringing the fleet to war readiness. In late August, during the invasion, he participated in the Soviet evacuation of Tallinn, commanding a covering detachment of Soviet warships, and on 1 September took charge of a flotilla of transports, gunboats and other vessels to evacuate part of the 50th Rifle Corps from Koivisto. He described the scene in Tallinn in his diary:

Beat off strong attack on city during the night. Enemy has changed tactics, infiltrating in small groups ... All airfields captured by the enemy. Our planes flew off to the east. Fleet and city under bombing and shelling. Lovely Pirita burning ... Other suburbs also burning. Big fires in the city. Barricades being built at the approaches to the harbour. Smoke everywhere ... Fire of ships and shore batteries has not slackened. Our command post at Minna Harbour constantly under fire.

Panteleyev rejoined the Navy Commissariat between September and October 1941, and on 4 October was appointed commander of the Leningrad Naval Base. He held this post, which included the responsibilities of commander of the naval defence of Leningrad and the Ozerny region. In cooperation with army units he organised counterattacks against the German forces at Strelna, and oversaw the evacuation of several divisions of the 8th Army from Oranienbaum to Leningrad. Under Panteleyev's direction the naval defences were divided up into sectors, providing anti-mine and anti-aircraft defence for the city, while naval artillery disrupted enemy attacks. Experienced sailors and yachtsman supported relief efforts entering the city across Lake Ladoga, and also during the winter when the lake froze over. Panteleyev also coordinated naval support for land offensives by troops of the Leningrad and Volkhov Fronts in spring 1942. He was also charged with destroying the vessels anchored at Kronstadt, if they could not be saved from an enemy advance, though this did not become necessary.

=== On the Volga ===
In April 1942 Panteleyev became Assistant Chief of the Main Naval Staff. His attestation written about this time recorded that he was "lively and energetic ... loves naval service, a good commander-sailor." He also edited the naval journal Morskoi Sbornik during his time as Assistant Chief, and in May 1943, took command of the Volga Military Flotilla. He was tasked with clearing the Volga between Astrakhan and Kuibyshev of German mines, and of protecting vessels, especially those transporting fuel, from air attacks. Arriving to take up his post on 14 May, all civilian shipping was promptly placed under his command, with operators required to transfer ships and their crews for conversion to warships. Panteleyev compensated the operators by making awards to the rivermen under the same terms as the naval sailors. The mine problem was dealt with by establishing two minesweeping brigades making regular sweeps of the river, and convoys following behind minesweepers. Two more brigades of armed vessels protected convoys from attack, while sailors and the local population were mobilised to watch for enemy minelaying attempts. False river markers were also installed to encourage German aircraft to lay mines outside of the usual shipping channels. Eventually more than 8,000 vessels were involved on the waterway, delivering over 7 million tons of fuel, for which the flotilla was praised by General Vasily Chuikov, commander of the 62nd Army. With the pushing back of the German armies throughout the summer of 1943, the danger of airdropped mines on the Volga lessened, and in late August a number of the flotilla's vessels were transferred to the Dnieper military flotilla. By the end of Panteleyev's time in command in December 1943 751 German mines had been destroyed.

=== White Sea operations ===
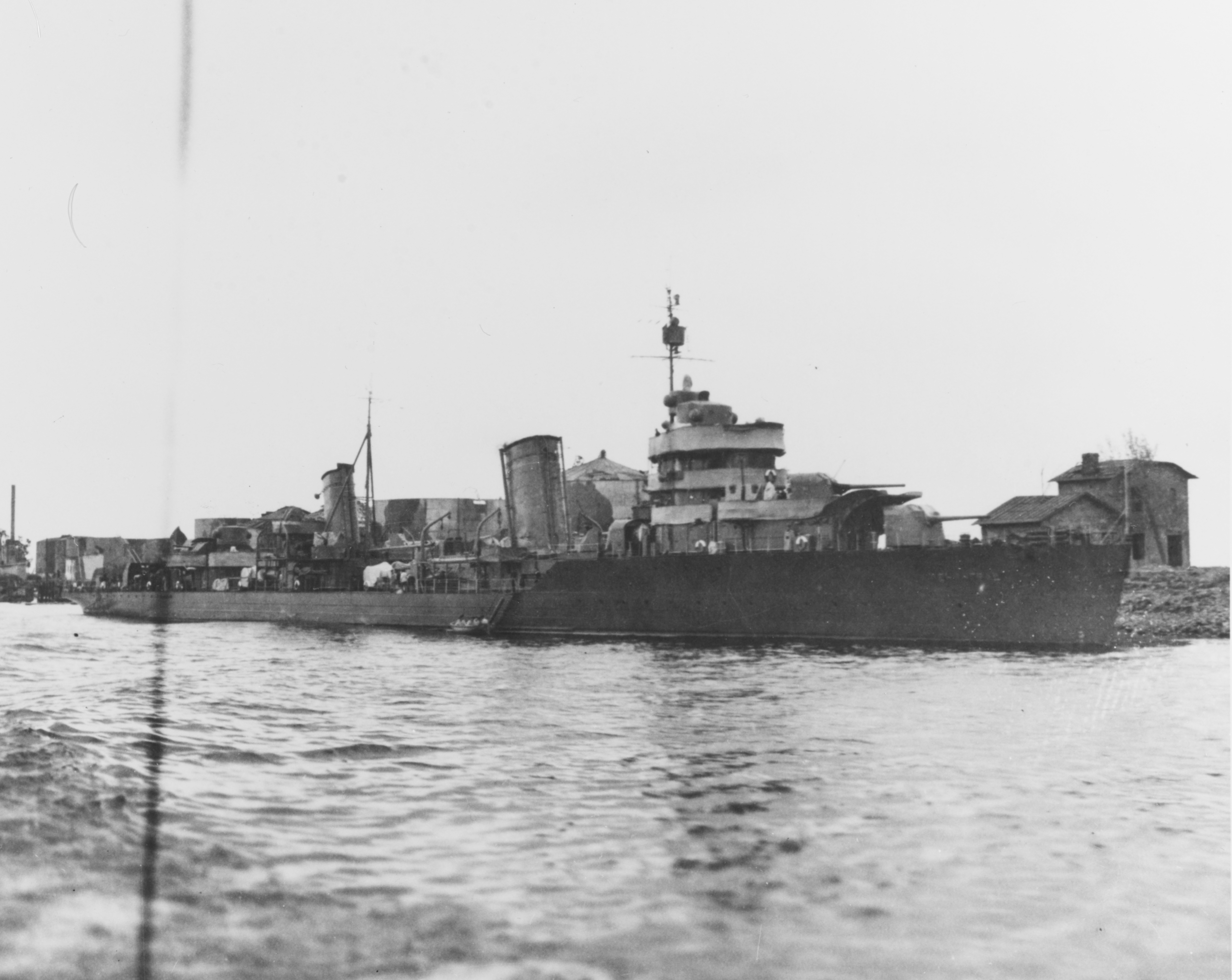
A Leningrad-class destroyer, of the same class as the Baku, Panteleyev's flagship for a time with the White Sea military flotilla

In December 1943 Panteleyev was once more appointed Assistant Chief of the Main Naval Staff, and on 29 January 1944, two days after the lifting of the siege of Leningrad, he was promoted to vice admiral. In July 1944 he was appointed commander of the White Sea military flotilla, part of the Northern Fleet, which was responsible for securing sea communications in the White Sea, the eastern part of the Barents Sea, and into the Arctic Ocean, stretching across thousands of square kilometers. Panteleyev often took personal charge of operations; one in particular involved conveying two large icebreakers, Severniy Veter and Stalin from Eastern Arctic waters to Arkhangelsk, where they were needed to keep the approaches to the port open during the winter freeze. Panteleyev assigned eight destroyers, five large patrol craft and five minesweepers to escort the icebreakers. Panteleyev himself oversaw the operation from aboard the destroyer Baku. After rendezvousing with the icebreakers at the entrance to the Kara Strait, in the midst of a Force 10 gale, Panteleyev began to escort them towards their destination. With sonar detecting enemy vessels in the vicinity, Panteleyev chose to avoid the usual route, bypassing the narrows and straits where his ships would be particularly vulnerable. The tactic paid off and the ships safely reached harbour.

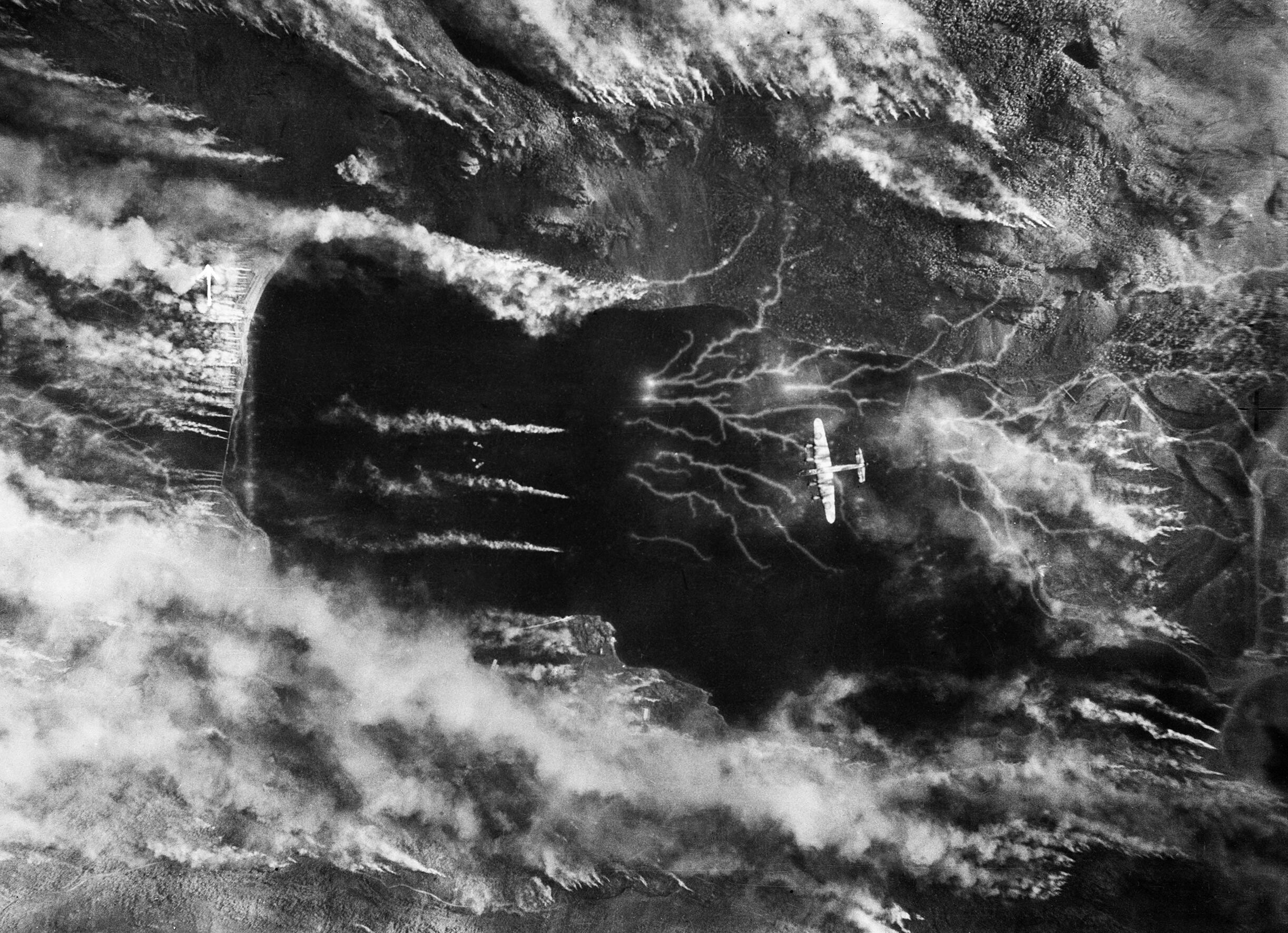
Operation Paravane, British bombers attacking the Tirpitz. Panteleyev oversaw the arrangements for the use of Soviet facilities and technical support.

In 1944, Panteleyev, and the commander of the Northern Fleet's Air Force, became jointly responsible for providing support for attempts by British aircraft to sink the German battleship Tirpitz. Tirpitz was anchored in Norwegian waters, with the distance involved making it hard for British aircraft to launch from British airfields, complete their bombing mission, and then return to their bases. Therefore, it was decided that, in what was designated Operation Paravane, the British bombers would instead fly to airfields in the north of the Soviet Union following their raids, refuel and if necessary rearm, and then, if the Tirpitz was still afloat, attempt to bomb her again on their return to Britain. Panteleyev helped to make the necessary arrangements to make Soviet airfields such as Yagodnik available, with Soviet navigators assisting in transferring aircraft and carrying out reconnaissance. On 15 September Tirpitz was crippled by British bombers which staged from Yagodnik, and was later sunk in Operation Catechism by British bombers launched from Scotland. Panteleyev was made a Companion of the Order of the Bath for his work in assisting the British.^{[a]} In March 1945 he was appointed commander of the White Sea naval defence area, holding the position until after the war, when in July 1946 he became Chief of the Combat Training Directorate.

== Postwar career ==
=== Pacific command ===
Panteleyev served as Chief of the Combat Training Directorate until April 1947, when he briefly became Deputy Chief of the Main Naval Staff, until July 1947, and then Chief of the Operational Directorate of the Naval General Staff until April 1948. He then became commandant of the Naval Academy, before becoming commander of the 5th Fleet in August 1951. The 5th Fleet had been by splitting the Pacific Fleet into two separate commands, the 5th and 7th Fleets, in 1947. In August 1951 the fleets were recombined into a single Pacific Fleet, with Panteleyev continuing as its commander until January 1956. He had been promoted to admiral on 3 August 1953, and combined his naval career with serving as a deputy of the Supreme Soviet of the USSR from 1954 until 1958. In January 1956 he became head of the A. N. Krylov Naval Academy of Shipbuilding and Armaments, serving as a teaching professor there from 1962, and with the merger of the academy into the main Naval Academy in November 1960, Panteleyev took over the position of the combined institution and held it until January 1967. He remained interested in strategic questions, contributing an article to the 1961 edition of the military journal Voyennaya Mysl on the subject of submarine transports and tankers.

=== Academic life and later years ===
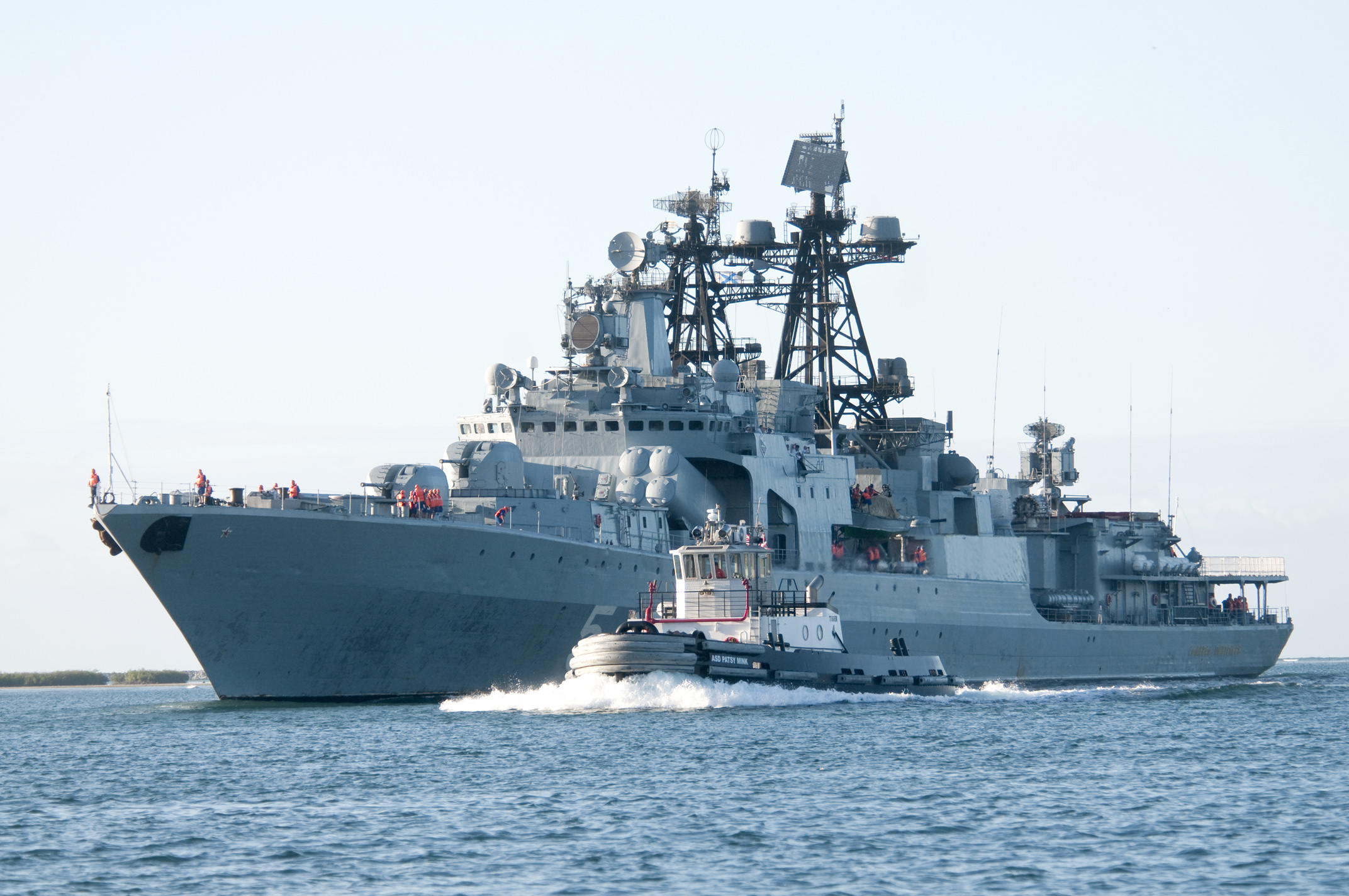
Panteleyev's namesake, the Udaloy-class destroyer Admiral Panteleyev, in 2012

From April 1967 Panteleyev served as a professor-consultant to the Naval Academy's Academic Council, retiring in March 1968. He had written several non-fiction books during his career, including Naval Armaments of the Baltic Countries (Russian: Морские вооружения прибалтийских стран), published in 1933; The Underwater War and the Merchant Fleet (Russian: Подводная война и торговый флот) in 1934, and a biography of Admiral Stepan Makarov, published in 1949. In 1965 he published The Sea Front (Russian: Морской фронт), and in retirement in 1974 published his memoirs Half a Century in the Navy (Russian: Полвека на флоте). He continued his love of yachting, and in 1958 was awarded the title of Master of Sports. The final part of his memoirs, Sail is my life (Russian: Парус – моя жизнь) appeared posthumously in 1984. Over the course of his career Panteleyev received the Order of Lenin, the Order of the Red Banner four times, the Order of Nakhimov First Class and the Order of the Patriotic War First Class, as well as the Order of the Red Banner of Labour, the Order of the Red Star three times, and the British honour of Companion of the Order of the Bath.

Panteleyev died on 5 May 1983 and was buried at the Serafimovskoe Cemetery in Leningrad. He was honoured after his death with the naming of the Udaloy-class destroyer Admiral Panteleyev, which since 1992 has been part of the Pacific Fleet.

== Notes ==
a. Two other Soviet officers involved were recommended for British honours; Colonel Loginov, Chief of Staff of the White Sea flotilla, and Major-General Dzymba, Chief of the White Sea Flotilla Naval Air Forces. Loginov and Dzymba were both appointed Commanders of the British Empire.
