= Severnaya Verf =

Shipyard on Gutuevsky Island, Saint Petersburg, Russia

Coordinates: 59°52′33″N 30°14′50″E

- Type: Shipyard
- Industry: Shipbuilding
- Predecessors: Putilov Shipyard; Shipyard No. 190 (in the name of Zhdanov)
- Founded: 1912; 114 years ago in Saint Petersburg, Russian Empire
- Number of employees: 4,500 (1917)
- Parent: United Shipbuilding Corporation
- Website: http://www.ru.nordsy.spb.ru/

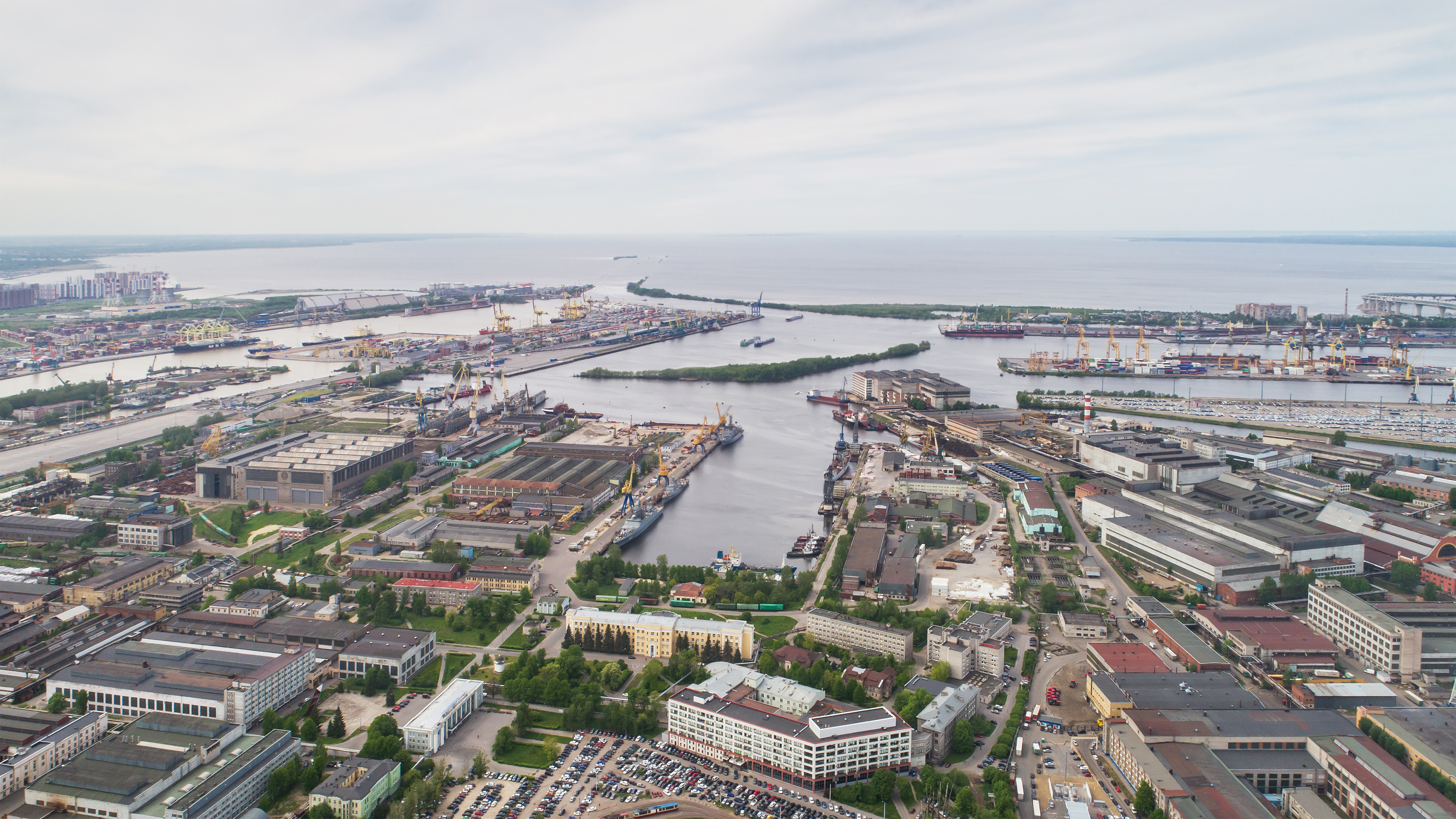
Aerial view of the Northern Shipyard

Severnaya Verf (Russian: Северная верфь, lit. 'Northern Shipyard') is a major shipyard on Gutuevsky Island in Saint Petersburg, Russia, producing naval and civilian ships. It was founded as a branch of the Putilov Plant in the early 20th century. Under the Soviets, the shipyard was generally known as Shipyard No. 190 (in the name of Zhdanov) and reverted to its former name in 1989.

The priority market for Severnaya Verf is military export to Asian countries as India, China and Vietnam.

== History ==
The shipyard was established by 1912 with the name of Putilov Shipyard (Russian: Putilovskaya Verf). It was situated near the main Putilov factory, and began building small warships, up to destroyers in size, in addition to non-military ships for the government like dredgers, tugboats, etc. Under Bolshevik control it was known as the Severnaya Verf and was then renamed Severnaya sudostroitel'naya verf in the early Twenties. It was given the honorific "in the name of Zhdanov" in 1935 and was renamed as Shipyard No. 190 (in the name of Zhdanov) when the Soviets numbered most of their industrial facilities on 30 December 1936. During this time, the yard built its only submarines; notably several Shchuka and M-class boats as well as components for S-class submarines that were assembled in Vladivostok in the Far East. Badly damaged during World War II by the Germans, the shipyard was rebuilt and enlarged after the war, partially by using plundered equipment and machines from Germany, and specialized in larger surface warships up to cruiser size. As of 1983 about one-third of its output was commercial ships. The shipyard reverted to its earlier name of Severnaya Verf on 2 August 1989. It is now part of the Severnaya Verf Production Association.

== Facilities and services ==
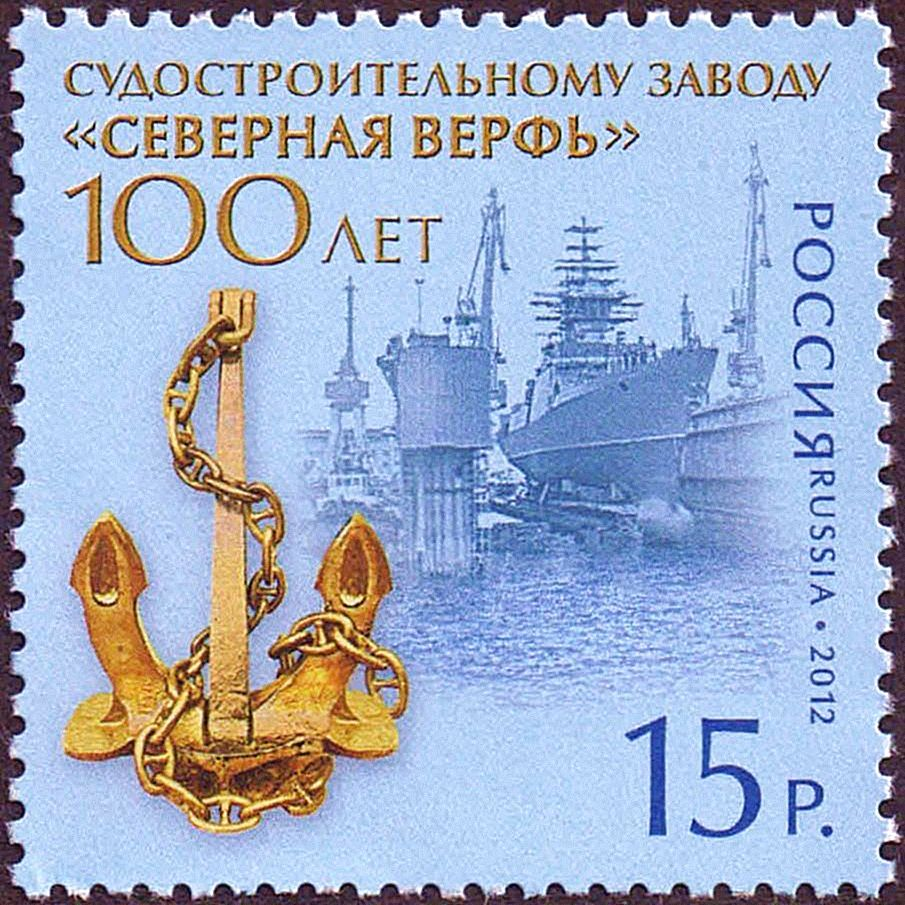
The stamp issued to commemorate the centenary of Severnaya Verf. Russian Post, 2012

As of 1998, the shipyard included:

- Four slips in covered-in-births with the capacity to construct vessels with a maximum length of 170 meters (560 ft) and width of up to 20.5 meters (67 ft). Slipways are equipped with cranes with a lifting capacity of 50 tons.
- Four open-air slipways with the capacity to construct vessels with a maximum length of 170 meters (560 ft) and width of 24 meters (79 ft), and are equipped with cranes with a lifting capacity from 30 to 100 tons.
- Launch-hoisting facilities with floating dock that has a lifting capacity of 10,000 tons and a transborder, which is able to launch and hoist vessels from and to any slipway.
- New closed drydock (or slipway) 270 x 150 x 78 m for large vessels, under construction

== Notable classes and vessels ==
Name	Built	Quantity	Type
Skoryy class	1949–1953	16	Destroyer
Kotlin class	1955–1958	12	Destroyer
Kanin class	1958–1961	4	Destroyer
Kynda class	1959–1965	4	Cruiser
Kashin class	1963–1966	5	Destroyer
Kresta I class	1964–1969	4	Cruiser
Kresta II class	1966–1978	10	Cruiser
Krivak class	1969–1990	6	Frigate
Sovremenny class	1976–2006	21	Destroyer
Udaloy class	1977–1999	4	Destroyer
Steregushchiy class	2001–present	5 (completed) (5 more under construction)	Corvette
Admiral Gorshkov class	2006–present	5 (completed), (3 under construction), 10 (planned)	Frigate
Gremyashchiy class	2012–present	2 (1 under construction)	Corvette

== See also ==
- Baltic Shipyard
- Admiralty Shipyards
- List of ships of Russia by project number

== Bibliography ==
- Breyer, Siegfried (1992). Soviet Warship Development: Volume 1: 1917–1937. Conway Maritime Press. ISBN 0-85177-604-3.
- de Saint Hubert, Christian & Drashpil, Boris V. (1985). "Main Shipyards, Enginebuilders and Manufacturers of Guns and Armour Plate in the Saint Petersburg Area Up to 1917". Warship International. XXII (4): 333–60. ISSN 0043-0374.
- Harrison, Mark; Cooper, Julian; Dexter, Keith & Rodionov, Ivan (2003). The Numbered Factories and Other Establishments of the Soviet Defence Industry Complex, 1927 to 1968, Part I, Factories & Shipyards (Version 8 ed.). University of Warwick, Department of Economics.
- Polmar, Norman (1983). Guide to the Soviet Navy (3rd ed.). Naval Institute Press. ISBN 0-87021-239-7.
- Polmar, Norman & Noot, Jurrien (1991). Submarines of the Russian and Soviet Navies, 1718–1990. Naval Institute Press. ISBN 0-87021-570-1.
