= 45 mm anti-aircraft gun (21-K) =

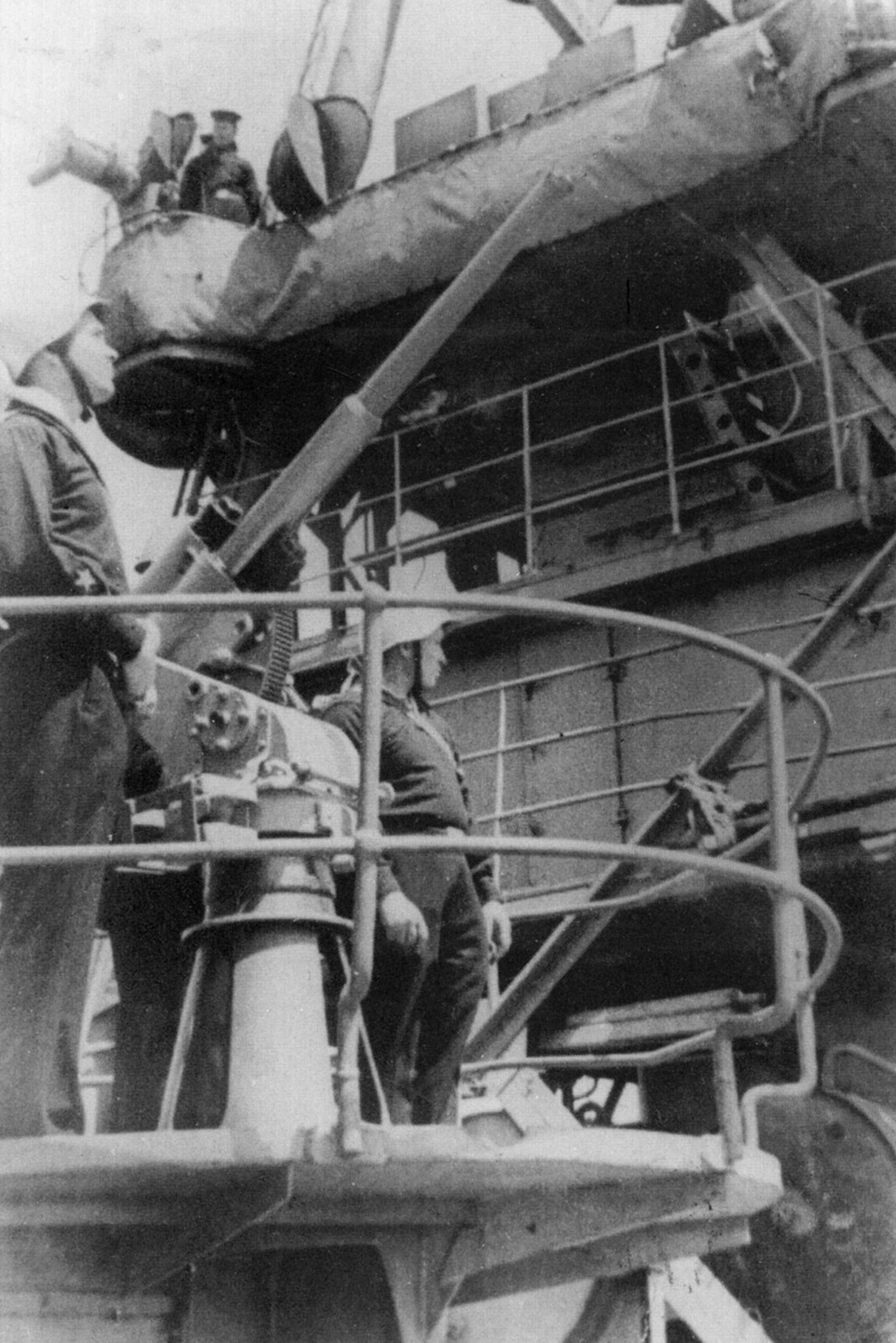
- A 21-K on board the Krasny Kavkaz
- Type: Anti-aircraft cannon
- Place of origin: Soviet Union

Service history
- In service: 1934—?
- Used by: Soviet Union
- Wars: Second World War, Cold War

Production history
- Designed: 1932—34
- Produced: 1934—1947
- No. built: 2799
- Variants: 40-K, 41-K

Specifications
- Mass: 107–115 kilograms (236–254 lb)
- Length: 2.3975 metres (7.866 ft)
- Barrel length: 2.0725 metres (6.800 ft)
- Shell: 45×310 mm. R
- Shell weight: 1.065–2.14 kg (2.35–4.72 lb)
- Caliber: 45 millimetres (1.8 in)
- Action: single-shot
- Breech: semi-automatic, vertical sliding-block
- Elevation: depends on the mount
- Traverse: 360°
- Rate of fire: 25-30 rpm (practical)
- Muzzle velocity: 880 metres per second (2,900 ft/s)
- Effective firing range: 6,000 m (20,000 ft) (maximum ceiling)
- Maximum firing range: 9,200 metres (10,100 yd) at 45°

The 45 mm anti-aircraft gun (21-K) was a Soviet design adapted from the 45 mm anti-tank gun M1932 (19-K). This was a copy of a 3.7 cm (1.5 in) German weapon designed by Rheinmetall that was sold to the Soviets before Hitler came to power in 1933 that had been enlarged to 45 mm (1.8 in) to reuse a large stock of old 47mm ammunition. It was used by the Soviet Navy to equip almost all of their ships from 1934 as its primary light anti-aircraft gun until replaced by the fully automatic 37 mm 70-K gun from 1942 to 1943. It was used in World War II and during the Cold War as the Soviets exported their World War II-era ships to their friends and allies. However it was not very effective as its slow rate of fire and lack of a time fuze required a direct hit to damage targets.

== Design ==
The 46-caliber 21-K was a minimal adaptation of the 53-K anti-tank gun that was created by taking the latter's barrel and mounting it on a simple pedestal mount. Its semi-automatic breech automatically ejected the cartridge case and locked open, ready for the next round. This was less than ideal for an anti-aircraft weapon that relied on its rate of fire to inflict damage on aircraft because every round had to be hand-loaded. Fully automatic weapons of roughly this caliber like the 40 mm Bofors typically used 4-5 round clips of ammunition to produce rates of fire four times as high.

Early production guns had a built-up barrel, but later ones used a monobloc. There were problems with the breech mechanism early in the production run and a number of the first year's production run lacked the semi-automatic breech entirely.

== Description ==
The 21-K, complete with its pedestal, weighed 507 kg (1,118 lb). It was manually operated and could elevate between −10° and +85° at a rate between 10 and 20 degrees per second. It could traverse a full 360° at a rate between 10 and 18 degrees per second, although this was practically limited by its actual location on ship.

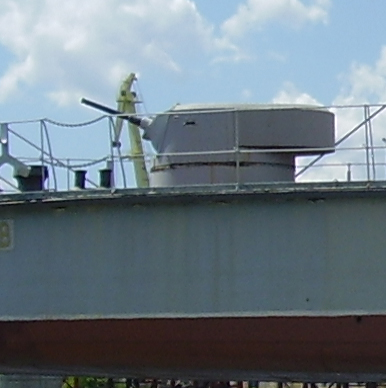
A twin 45 mm 41-K gun turret mounted on the memorial ship Zhelezniakov, 2014

In the mid-1930s special powered turrets were developed for use on river monitors. The 40-K was a single gun turret that weighed 2,000 kg (4,400 lb) and the 41-K was a twin-gun turret that weighed 2,600 kg (5,700 lb). Both turrets could elevate between −5° and +85° at a rate of 8 degrees per second and could traverse a full 360° at a rate between 4.8 and 9.8 degrees per second.

=== Ammunition ===
The 21-K used the same ammunition as the 45 mm anti-tank gun M1937 (53-K). The biggest problem in its role as an anti-aircraft gun was that it wasn't provided with a time fuze that would detonate the shell at a specified distance from the gun. This meant that only a direct hit would damage its target.

Shell name	Type	Weight	Filling Weight	Muzzle velocity
BR-240	armor-piercing	1.42 kg (3.1 lb)	18 g (0.63 oz)	760 m/s (2,500 ft/s)
OT-033	Fragmentation-tracer	1.065 kg (2.35 lb)	52 g (1.8 oz)	880 m/s (2,900 ft/s)
OR-73A	Fragmentation-tracer	1.41 kg (3.1 lb)	37 g (1.3 oz)	760 m/s (2,500 ft/s)
F-73	High-explosive	1.41 kg (3.1 lb)	74 g (2.6 oz)	760 m/s (2,500 ft/s)
O-240	High-explosive	2.14 kg (4.7 lb)	118 g (4.2 oz)	335 m/s (1,100 ft/s)
