= Russian battleship Georgii Pobedonosets =

Imperial Russian Navy's Ekaterina II-class ironclad battleship

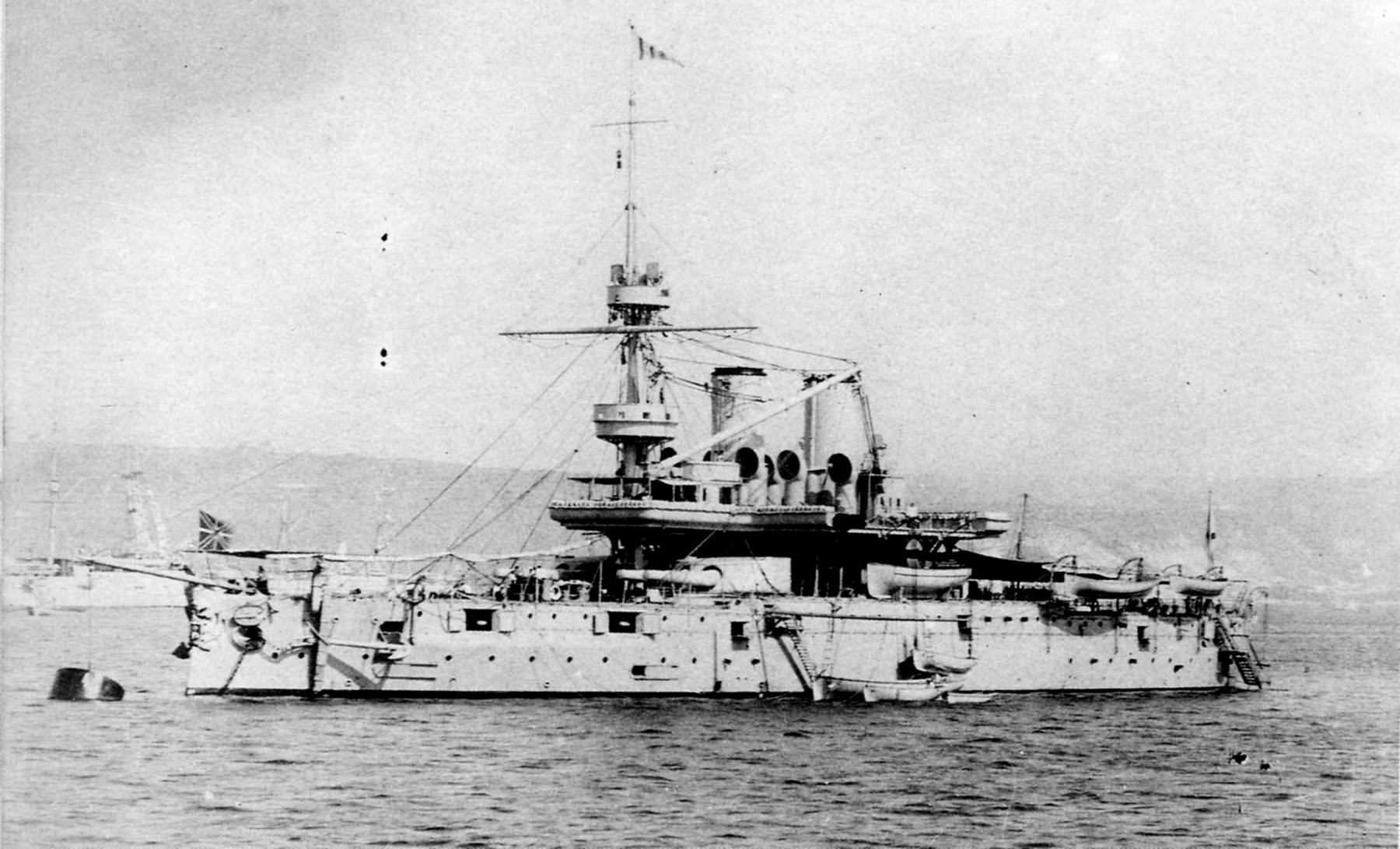
- Broadside view of Georgii Pobedonosets

History

Russian Empire
- Name: Georgii Pobedonosets (Russian: Георгий Победоносец)
- Namesake: Saint George the Victorious
- Ordered: 27 March 1889
- Builder: ROPiT Shipyard
- Cost: 3,000,000 rubles
- Laid down: 5 May 1891
- Launched: 9 March 1892
- Commissioned: September 1893
- Decommissioned: 1920
- Fate: Sold for scrap between 1930 and 1936

General characteristics
- Class & type: Ekaterina II-class battleship
- Displacement: 11,032 long tons (11,209 t)
- Length: 339 ft 4 in (103.4 m)
- Beam: 68 ft 11 in (21.0 m)
- Draft: 27 ft 11 in (8.5 m)
- Installed power: 9,843 ihp (7,340 kW)
- Propulsion: 2 shafts, vertical triple expansion steam engines, 16 cylindrical boilers
- Speed: 16.5 knots (30.6 km/h; 19.0 mph) (on trials)
- Range: 2,800 nmi (5,200 km; 3,200 mi) at 10 knots (19 km/h; 12 mph) or 1,367 nmi (2,532 km; 1,573 mi) at 14.5 knots (26.9 km/h; 16.7 mph)
- Complement: 642
- Armament: 3 × 2 – 12-inch (305 mm) guns; 7 × 1 – 6-inch (152 mm) guns; 8 × 1 – 47-millimeter (1.9 in) guns; 10 × 1 – 37-millimeter (1.5 in) guns; 7 × 1 – 14-inch (356 mm) torpedo tubes; 65 mines
- Armor: Belt: 6–16 in (152–406 mm); Deck: 1.5–2.25 in (38–57 mm); Barbette: 12 in (305 mm); Barbette hood: 1.5–2.5 in (38–64 mm); Conning tower: 9 in (229 mm); Bulkheads: 9–10 in (229–254 mm)

Georgii Pobedonosets (Russian: Георгий Победоносец lit. 'Saint George the Victorious') was a battleship built for the Imperial Russian Navy, the fourth and final ship of the Ekaterina II class. She was, however, only a half-sister to the others as her armor scheme was different and she was built much later than the earlier ships. She participated in the pursuit of the mutinous battleship Potemkin in June 1905, (Note: All dates used in this article are New Style) but her crew mutinied themselves. However, loyal crew members regained control of the ship the next day and they ran her aground when Potemkin threatened to fire on her if she left Odessa harbor. She was relegated to second-line duties in 1908. She fired on SMS Goeben during her bombardment of Sevastopol in 1914, but spent most of the war serving as a headquarters ship in Sevastopol. She was captured by both sides during the Russian Civil War, but ended up being towed to Bizerte by the fleeing White Russians where she was eventually scrapped.

== Design and development ==
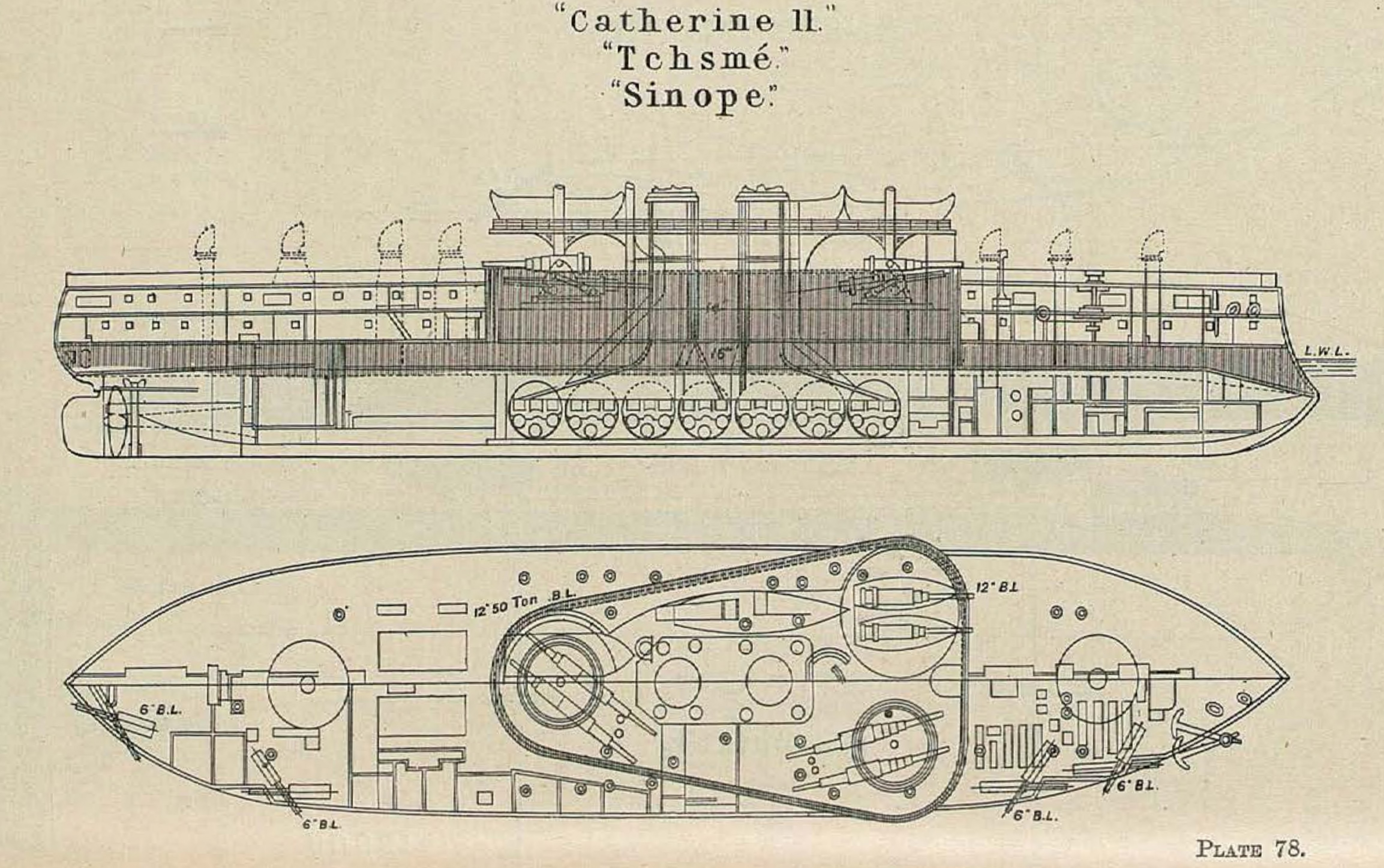
Right elevation and deck plan as depicted in Brassey's Naval Annual 1896

Georgii Pobedonosets was originally intended as a version of Sinop rearmed with three 12-inch (300 mm) and four 9-inch (230 mm) guns, but this changed when the decision was made to provide her with three twin 12-inch turrets rather than the barbettes used by her sisters. The turrets were significantly heavier than the barbette mountings so the armour scheme was revised in compensation. However this revised design was still deemed overweight and rejected. The Naval Ministry held a competition for a replacement, but these were rejected by the Naval Technical Committee in turn. So a modified version of Sinop, with barbettes, was chosen again as the most readily available choice. The height of her armour was lowered to reduce the overweight condition of her half-sisters. Other changes were made while building, but they came early in the process and did not seriously delay her completion past her contractual date of 13 September 1893. These changes included smaller mountings for her main guns that eliminated the sponsons needed in her sisters for the forward barbettes, the substitution of 35-calibre guns for the older 30-calibre guns and steel armor imported from Schnider et Cie of France replaced the compound armour used in her half-sisters.

Georgii Pobedonosets was 347 feet 6 inches (105.9 m) long at the waterline and 339 feet 4 inches (103.4 m) long overall. She had a beam of 68 feet 11 inches (21.0 m) and a draft of 27 feet 11 inches (8.5 m). She displaced 11,032 long tons (11,209 t) at load, over 700 long tons (710 t) more than her designed displacement of 10,280 long tons (10,440 t).

She had two 3-cylinder vertical triple expansion steam engines driving screw propellers 16 feet 5 inches (5.0 m) in diameter. Sixteen cylindrical boilers provided steam to the engines. The engines and boilers were both imported from Maudslay and Sons of the United Kingdom and were 114 long tons (116 t) overweight. The engines had a total designed output of 10,000 indicated horsepower (7,500 kW), but they only produced 9,843 ihp (7,340 kW) on trials and gave a top speed of 16.5 knots (30.6 km/h; 19.0 mph). At full load she carried 900 long tons (910 t) of coal that provided her a range of 2,800 nautical miles (5,200 km; 3,200 mi) at a speed of 10 knots (19 km/h; 12 mph) and 1,367 nautical miles (2,532 km; 1,573 mi) at 14.5 knots (26.9 km/h; 16.7 mph).

Her main armament consisted of three pairs of 12-inch (305 mm) Obukhov Model 1886 35-calibre guns mounted in two twin barbette mounts side by side forward and one aft of the superstructure. They had a maximum elevation of 15° and could depress to −2°. Each of the forward mounts could traverse 30° across the bow and 35° abaft the beam, or a total of 155°. The rear mount could traverse 202°. Their rate of fire was one round every four minutes, fifty seconds, including training time. They fired a 731.3-pound (331.7 kg) shell at a muzzle velocity of 2,090 ft/s (640 m/s) to a range of 11,600 yards (10,600 m) at maximum elevation. They also had a 'heavy' shell available that weighed 1,003 lb (455 kg) that was fired at a velocity of 2,000 ft/s (610 m/s) although the range is not available.

The seven 6-inch (152 mm) 35-calibre guns were mounted on broadside pivot mounts in hull embrasures, except for one gun mounted in the stern in the hull. The eight 47-millimeter (1.9 in) single-barrelled Hotchkiss guns were mounted on the battery deck to defend the ship against torpedo boats. Ten 37-millimeter (1.5 in) Hotchkiss guns were mounted in the fighting top. She carried seven above-water 14-inch (356 mm) torpedo tubes, three tubes on each broadside and a tube in the stern.

In contrast to her half-sisters the armour used on Georgii Pobedonosets was steel. The belt armor had a maximum thickness of 16 inches (410 mm) which reduced, in 2-inch (51 mm) steps, down to 6 inches (150 mm) forward and down to 8 inches (200 mm) aft. Its height was reduced by 1 foot (0.30 m) in comparison to the other ships of the class to 7 feet (2.1 m) to reduce weight. However this left only six inches of her belt above her load waterline as she was still overweight, a decrease of 7 inches (180 mm) from her half-sisters. The deck armour was 2.25 inches (57 mm) outside the citadel and reduced to 1.5 inches (38 mm) over it.

== Service history ==
Georgii Pobedonosets was named after Saint George the Victorious. She was built by the Russian Steam Navigation Company (RoPIT) at Sevastopol. She was laid down on 5 May 1891, launched on 9 March 1892, and completed in 1893, although her trials lasted until mid-1895. She spent her career in the Black Sea Fleet. She began her trials in September 1893, but they were not completed until the middle of 1895.

In 1905, Georgii Pobedonosets briefly joined the Potemkin mutiny. On 29 June 1905, the ship was one of eight vessels (three battleships, a cruiser and four torpedo boats) sent to capture the Potemkin in Odessa. The next day the fleet approached Potemkin, then suddenly retreated. She then followed them, deliberately goading the officers to order the sailors to fire on their comrades. The crew of Georgii Pobedonosets refused: "We won't fire! We won't man the guns! We refuse to engage the Potemkin." Her sailors cheered the rebel sailors' bravery. Dorofey Koshuba, a member of the revolutionary sailors' organisation Tsentralka, broke into the armoury, ordered Captain Ilya Guzevich to halt the ship, pushing him away when he refused. The ship halted, Guzevich pleaded with the sailors to go to Sevastopol, even offering to let the 70 revolutionaries onto Potemkin. Afanasi Matushenko, the leader of Potemkin's crew, arrived with several revolutionaries who made a speech that inspired the sailors to arrest the officers. This was enough to make his second-in-command, Lieutenant Grigorkov, commit suicide. Apart from this, the seizure was bloodless. The sailors elected a committee (Koshuba and nine others), locked the officers in the stateroom and ripped off their epaulettes. The officers were put ashore in Odessa. It was decided that the petty officers should be put ashore too the next day. Senior Boatswain A. O. Kuzmenko became captain.

The next day, however, loyal crew members regained control of the ship and they ran her aground and surrendered to the authorities. In August 1905, 75 mutineers were tried. Koshuba and two others were executed and 19 sailors got 185 years of hard labour.

In 1907, the Naval General Staff made a proposal for a radical reconstruction that was similar to the proposals to reconstruct Chesma and Sinop made before the Russo-Japanese War that involved cutting her down by one deck and replacing her armament with two twin-gun turrets equipped with 12-inch 40-calibre guns and the compound armor replaced by Krupp armor. This new proposal differed from the older one in that eight 120-millimeter (4.7 in) guns replaced the ten six-inch guns originally planned. This was rejected as she still would have lacked the speed to stay with the main fleet and the hull protection required to withstand high-explosive shell fire.

She became a training ship in 1908 and her 6-inch 35-calibre guns were replaced by modern 6-inch 45-calibre guns. She was modified as a harbour guard ship in 1911 and her 12-inch guns were removed. Six more six-inch guns were added for a total of fourteen. She fired three rounds, missing each time, at the German battlecruiser Goeben during her bombardment of Sevastopol on 29 October 1914, but spent the bulk of World War I as a static headquarters ship in Sevastopol. After the Russian Revolution, she joined the Red Black Sea Fleet in December 1917. She was captured by the Germans in 1918 in Sevastopol and was handed over to the Allies in December 1918. The British sabotaged her engines on 25 April 1919. She was captured by both sides in the Russian Civil War, but eventually became part of Wrangel's fleet and was towed to Bizerte in 1920. She was sold for scrap between 1930 and 1936.

== Bibliography ==
- Bascomb, Neal (2007). Red Mutiny: Eleven Fateful Days on the Battleship Potemkin. Boston: Houghton Mifflin. ISBN 978-0-618-59206-7.
- Gardiner, Robert, ed. (1979). Conway's All the World's Fighting Ships 1860–1905. New York: Mayflower Books. ISBN 0-8317-0302-4.
- McLaughlin, Stephen (2003). Russian & Soviet Battleships. Annapolis, MD: Naval Institute Press. ISBN 1-55750-481-4.
