= Russian battleship Dvenadsat Apostolov =

1893 Russian battleship

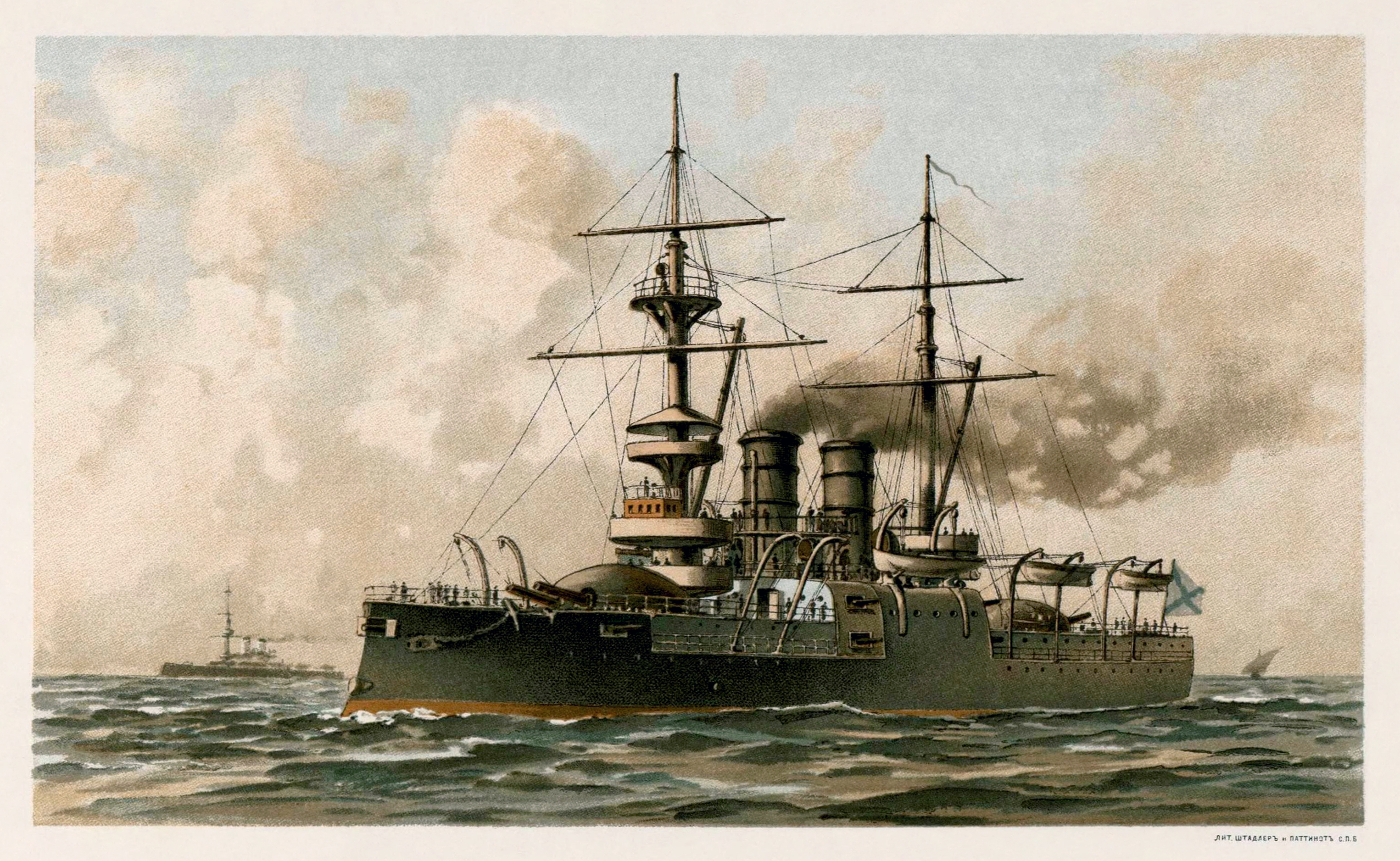
- 1893 lithograph of Dvenadsat Apostolov

Class overview
- Name: Dvenadsat Apostolov
- Operators: Imperial Russian Navy
- Preceded by: Imperator Aleksandr II class
- Succeeded by: Navarin
- Built: 1888–1892
- In commission: 1893–1911
- Planned: 2
- Completed: 1
- Canceled: 1
- Scrapped: 1

History

Russian Empire
- Name: Dvenadsat Apostolov (Двенадцать апостолов)
- Namesake: Twelve Apostles
- Operator: Imperial Russian Navy
- Ordered: 12 November 1887 (Note: All dates used in this article are new style which is 12 days later before 1900 and 13 after 1900.)
- Builder: Nikolayev Admiralty Shipyard
- Laid down: 21 August 1889
- Launched: 13 September 1890
- Completed: December 1892
- Decommissioned: 1 April 1911
- In service: 17 June 1893
- Renamed: Blokshiv No. 8, 4 September 1914
- Fate: Sold for scrap, 28 January 1931

General characteristics
- Type: Pre-dreadnought battleship
- Displacement: 8,710 long tons (8,850 t)
- Length: 342 ft (104.2 m) (o/a)
- Beam: 60 ft (18.3 m)
- Draft: 27 ft 6 in (8.4 m)
- Installed power: 8 cylindrical boilers; 8,500 ihp (6,338 kW)
- Propulsion: 2 shafts; 2 triple-expansion steam engines
- Speed: 14.5 knots (26.9 km/h; 16.7 mph)
- Range: 1,900 nmi (3,500 km; 2,200 mi) at 10 knots (19 km/h; 12 mph)
- Complement: 599
- Armament: 2 × twin 12 in (305 mm) guns; 4 × single 6 in (152 mm) guns; 12 × single 47 mm (1.9 in) guns; 4 × five-barrel 37 mm (1.5 in) revolving guns; 10 × single 37 mm (1.5 in) guns; 6 × 15 in (381 mm) torpedo tubes
- Armor: Compound armor; Belt: 12–14 in (305–356 mm); Deck: 2–3 in (51–76 mm); Barbette: 10–12 in (254–305 mm); Barbette hood: 2.5 in (64 mm); Conning tower: 8 in (203 mm); Bulkheads: 9–12 in (229–305 mm)

Dvenadsat Apostolov (Russian: Двенадцать апостолов—"Twelve Apostles") was a pre-dreadnought battleship built for the Imperial Russian Navy, the sole ship of her class. She entered service in 1893 with the Black Sea Fleet, but was not fully ready until 1894. The ship participated in the failed attempt to recapture the mutinous battleship Potemkin in 1905. Decommissioned and disarmed in 1911, Dvenadsat Apostolov became an immobile submarine depot ship the following year. The ship was captured by the Germans in 1918 in Sevastopol and was handed over to the Allies in December. Lying immobile in Sevastopol, she was captured by both sides in the Russian Civil War before she was abandoned when the White Russians evacuated the Crimea in 1920. Dvenadsat Apostolov was used as a stand-in for the title ship during the 1925 filming of Battleship Potemkin before she was finally scrapped in 1931.

== Design ==
Dvenadsat Apostolov was originally ordered as one of a pair of battleships for the Black Sea Fleet, but the second ship was awarded to a firm on the verge of bankruptcy and they made no significant progress. Her initial armament was planned to be eight 9-inch (229 mm) guns, four in two twin-gun turrets and the remainder in the central casemate. After construction of the hull began in early 1888, the Naval Technical Committee in September decided to increase the thickness of the waterline armor belt from 13 inches (330 mm) to 14 inches (356 mm) in exchange for a further 75 long tons (76 t) in displacement. It also decided to move the forward turret back 7 feet 8 inches (2.3 m) because it thought that the ship might be bow-heavy, and revise the armament to four 12-inch (305 mm) guns in twin-gun barbettes at each end of the ship with four 6-inch (150 mm) guns in a shortened casemate. Altogether these changes, including the extra armor, added over 100 long tons (102 t) of weight to the ship.

=== General characteristics ===
Dvenadsat Apostolov was 335 feet 6 inches (102.3 m) long at the waterline and 342 feet (104.2 m) long overall. She had a beam of 60 feet (18.3 m) and a draft of 27 feet 6 inches (8.4 m). Her exact displacement was never measured, but has been estimated at 8,710 long tons (8,850 t), over 600 long tons (610 t) more than her designed displacement of 8,076 long tons (8,206 t).

Her hull form was generally similar to that of the Imperator Aleksandr II class although her ram was 4 feet (1.2 m) longer. The hull was subdivided by eleven transverse and one centerline longitudinal watertight bulkheads and she had a complete double bottom 35.4 inches (900 mm) deep. The ship had a metacentric height of 2.62 feet (80 cm). Dvenadsat Apostolov demonstrated better seakeeping qualities than the older Ekaterina II class during a storm in October 1894, although she rolled badly and leaked through her ports and hatches. Naval historian N. J. M. Campbell assessed her as a considerably better fighting ship than the Imperator Aleksandr II class.

Dvenadsat Apostolov had a pair of three-cylinder vertical triple-expansion steam engines built by the Baltic Works and had a total designed output of 8,500 indicated horsepower (6,338 kW). Eight cylindrical boilers provided steam to the engines, which drove two 5.26-meter (17 ft) screw propellers. During her sea trials in September 1894, the powerplant produced 8,758 ihp (6,531 kW) and a top speed of 15.2 knots (28.2 km/h; 17.5 mph) using forced draft; at normal draft the ship reached about 14.5 knots (26.9 km/h; 16.7 mph). After her initial engine trials, the ship's funnels were raised by 12 ft 6 in (3.81 m) to improve their draft and to keep the superstructure clear of funnel gases. She carried 710 long tons (720 t) of coal at full load that provided a range of 1,900 nautical miles (3,500 km; 2,200 mi) at a speed of 10 knots (19 km/h; 12 mph). Dvenadsat Apostolov had six Siemens dynamos with a total output of 540 kilowatts (720 hp).

=== Armament and protection ===
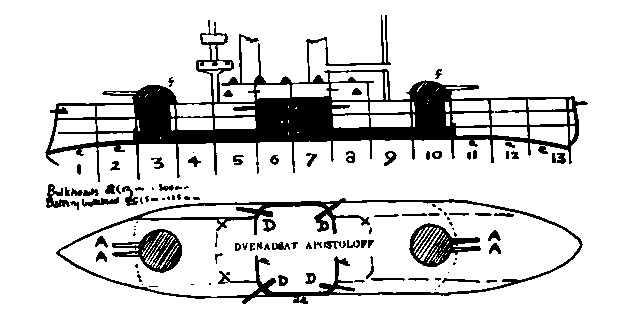
Plan and left elevation views with the main guns labeled 'A' and the secondary guns as 'D' from the 1900 edition of Jane's Fighting Ships

The main armament of Dvenadsat Apostolov consisted of two pairs of 30-caliber 12-inch (305 mm) Obukhov Model 1877 guns mounted in twin barbette mounts forward and aft. They had a maximum elevation of +15° and could depress to −5° and traverse 270°. 66 rounds per gun were carried. They fired a 731.3-pound (331.7 kg) shell at a muzzle velocity of 1,870 ft/s (570 m/s) to a range of 5,570 yards (5,090 m) at an elevation of 6°. The rate of fire was one round every five minutes, but the loading machinery would not work if the ship was heeled more than 5°.

The four 35-caliber 6-inch (152 mm) Model 1877 guns were placed on pivot mounts in the central casemate. The sides of the hull were recessed to give them axial fire. They could traverse a total of 100°. Each gun had an arc of fire of 130°. The ship carried 130 rounds for each gun. They fired a shell that weighed 91.5 lb (41.5 kg) with a muzzle velocity of 2,300 ft/s (700 m/s). For defense against torpedo boats, the ship was fitted with a dozen 47-millimeter (1.9 in) Hotchkiss guns mounted in embrasures in the hull or superstructure. They fired a 3.2-pound (1.5 kg) shell at a muzzle velocity of 1,867 ft/s (569 m/s). Two 5-barrel 37-millimeter (1.5 in) Hotchkiss revolving cannon were mounted at the forward end of the superstructure and two others on the platform just abaft the second funnel. Six single-barrelled versions were fitted in the fighting top on the foremast and two were in small embrasures at the after end of the superstructure. The locations of the other two guns are unknown and they may have been intended to arm the ship's boats. Dvenadsat Apostolov carried six above-water 15 in (381 mm) torpedo tubes. One tube was in the bow, two tubes on each broadside and a tube in the stern.

The ship mostly used compound armor supplied by Charles Cammell & Co. of Sheffield, England. The main waterline belt had a maximum thickness of 14 inches (356 mm) abreast the propulsion spaces, but thinned to 12 inches abreast the magazines and was only 7–8 inches (178–203 mm) thick at its lower edge. It was 228 feet 8 inches (70 m) long and 5 ft 6 in (1.68 m) high, most of which (4 ft 3 in (1.3 m)) was below the waterline as actually completed because she was overweight. Bulkheads nine to twelve inches thick provided transverse protection for the ship's vitals. The lower casemate armor was 214 feet (65.2 m) long and twelve inches thick. Above it were 5-inch (127 mm) steel plates protecting the six-inch guns. The barbette armor was 10–12 inches (254–305 mm) thick. Initially the barbette was open-topped, but a 2.5-inch (64 mm) thick hemispherical hood was added later, possibly in 1893. The conning tower was protected by eight inches of steel armor.

== History ==
Dvenadsat Apostolov was built by the Nikolayev Admiralty Shipyard at Nikolayev. She was laid down on 21 August 1889, launched on 13 September 1890, and sailed to Sevastopol for fitting out on 11 May 1892. Completed in December, the ship joined the fleet on 17 June 1893, but she was not fully ready for service until 1894. In 1895 Dvenadsat Apostolov was used to test a new system of laying mines by rails that had been invented by Lieutenant A. P. Ugryumov and also to evaluate the proper dimensions for anti-torpedo nets and their booms. For this last test torpedoes were fired at the ship with the anti-torpedo nets deployed. One gun, of an unknown caliber, burst in 1903, killing one man and wounding two others.

Dvenadsat Apostolov participated in the failed attempt to recapture the mutinous battleship Potemkin on 30 June 1905. She attempted to ram Potemkin, but sailors sympathetic to the mutiny reversed the engines and then prevented an attempt by Dvenadsat Apostolov's commander, Captain Kolands, to blow up his own ship by severing the detonating wires.

The Sevastopol Port Authority proposed to reboiler her in 1904 with new Belleville boilers, but this was forestalled by a plan to reuse those of the battleship Chesma. Three years later a proposal to rearm her with four 10-inch guns in two turrets and several 6-inch guns in a new casemate was made by the Naval General Staff. This was estimated to cost 1,275,000 roubles and would only add 15 long tons (15 t) to her displacement, but the proposal was rejected by the Naval Technical Committee which believed it was a waste of money given her obsolete layout. The General Staff made another proposal in 1909 to rearm her with smaller guns as a guardship intended to defend Sevastopol from attacks by enemy light forces. This was initially approved by the Navy Minister, Admiral Ivan Grigorovich in June 1909, but was later reversed.

Dvenadsat Apostolov was transferred to the Sevastopol Port Authority on 1 April 1911, stricken from the Navy List and disarmed on 15 April. She became a depot ship for submarines in 1912. Renamed as Blokshiv (hulk) No. 8 on 4 September 1914, she was used for harbor duties. Immobile, she was captured by the Germans in Sevastopol in May 1918 and handed over to the Allies in December 1918. She was first captured by the Bolsheviks during the Russian Civil War, and then by the White Russians. The ship was abandoned by the Whites when they evacuated the Crimea in 1920. The following year her propulsion machinery was removed. She was used as a stand-in for the Potemkin during the filming of Battleship Potemkin, while reportedly serving as a mine storage hulk, before she was sold for scrap on 28 January 1931.

== Bibliography ==
- Arbuzov, Vladimir V. (1992). "The Battleship Dvenadstadt Apostolov". Warship International. XXIX (4): 368–388. ISSN 0043-0374.
- Bascomb, Neal (2007). Red Mutiny: Eleven Fateful Days on the Battleship Potemkin. Boston: Houghton Mifflin. ISBN 978-0-618-59206-7.
- Campbell, N. J. M. (1978). "The Battle of Tsu-Shima, Part 1". In Preston, Antony (ed.). Warship. Vol. II. London: Conway Maritime Press. pp. 46–49. ISBN 0-87021-976-6.
- Campbell, N. J. M. (1979). "Russia". In Chesneau, Roger & Kolesnik, Eugene M. (eds.). Conway's All the World's Fighting Ships 1860–1905. New York: Mayflower Books. pp. 170–217. ISBN 0-8317-0302-4.
- Friedman, Norman (2011). Naval Weapons of World War One. Barnsley, UK: Seaforth. ISBN 978-1-84832-100-7.
- McLaughlin, Stephen (2003). Russian & Soviet Battleships. Annapolis, Maryland: Naval Institute Press. ISBN 1-55750-481-4.
