= Russian battleship Ekaterina II =

Imperial Russian Navy's Ekaterina II-class ironclad battleship

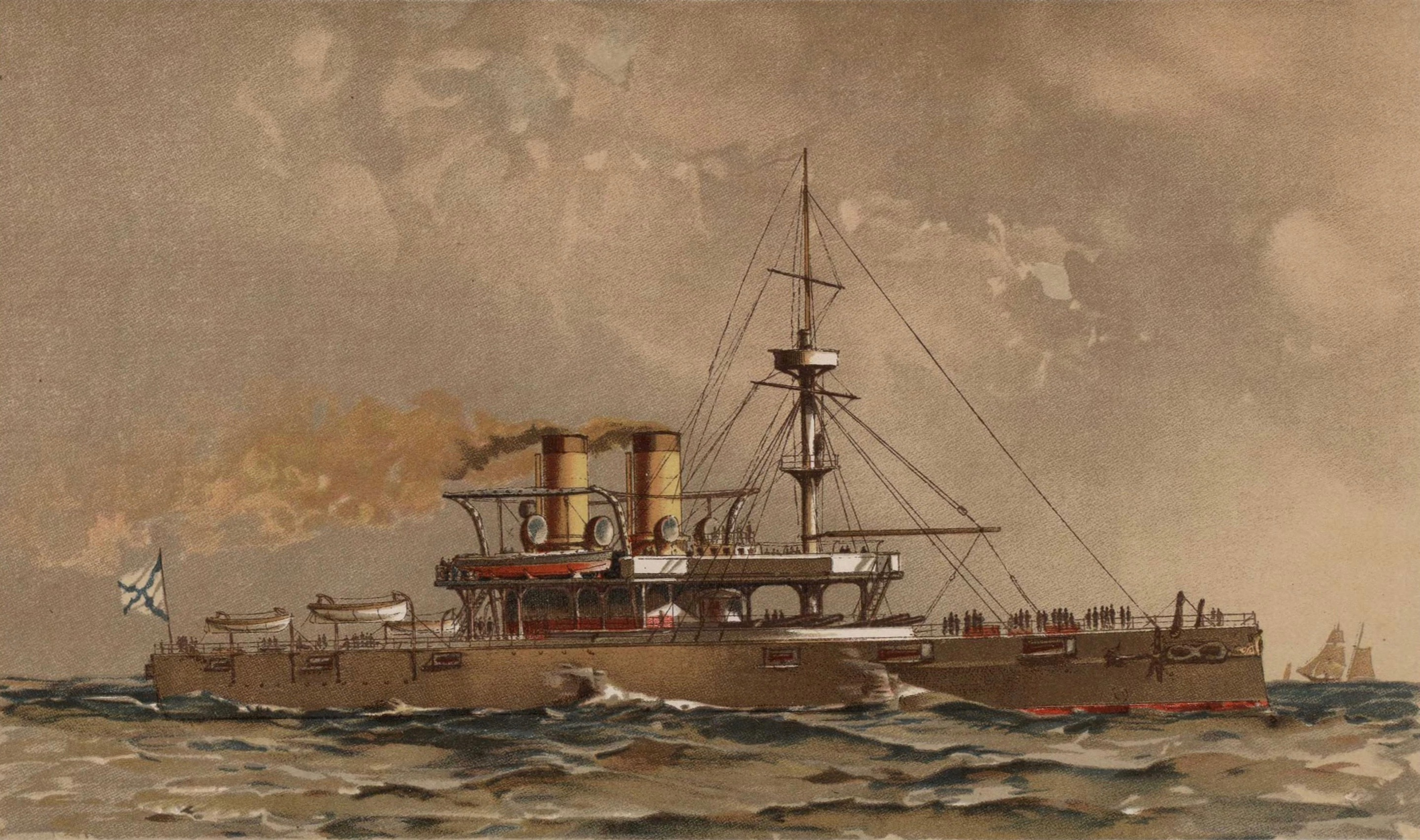
- An 1893 lithograph of Ekaterina II

History

Russian Empire
- Name: Ekaterina II
- Namesake: Catherine the Great
- Builder: Nikolayev Admiralty Dockyard, Nikolaev
- Laid down: 26 June 1883
- Launched: 20 May 1886
- Commissioned: 1889
- Renamed: Stricken Vessel Nr. 3 22 April 1912
- Stricken: 14 August 1907
- Fate: Sunk as a target 1912

General characteristics
- Class & type: Ekaterina II-class ironclad battleship
- Displacement: 11,396 long tons (11,579 t)
- Length: 339 ft 3 in (103.4 m)
- Beam: 68 ft 11 in (21.0 m)
- Draft: 28 ft 10 in (8.8 m)
- Installed power: 9,101 ihp (6,787 kW) (on trials)
- Propulsion: 2 shafts; 2 vertical compound steam engines; 14 cylindrical boilers
- Speed: 15.25 knots (28.24 km/h; 17.55 mph) on trials
- Range: 2,800 nmi (5,200 km; 3,200 mi) at 10 knots (19 km/h; 12 mph) or 1,367 nmi (2,532 km; 1,573 mi) at 14.5 knots (26.9 km/h; 16.7 mph)
- Complement: 633
- Armament: 3 × 2 – 12-inch (305 mm) guns; 7 × 1 – 6-inch (152 mm) guns; 8 × 1 – 47-millimeter (1.9 in) 5-barrel revolving Hotchkiss guns; 4 × 1 – 37-millimeter (1.5 in) 5-barrel revolving Hotchkiss guns; 7 × 1 – 14-inch (356 mm) torpedo tubes
- Armor: compound armor; Belt: 8–16 in (203–406 mm); Redoubt: 12 inches; Decks: 2–2.5 in (51–64 mm); Gun shields: 2–3 in (51–76 mm); Conning tower: 8–9 in (203–229 mm)

Ekaterina II (Russian: Екатерина II Catherine II of Russia) was the lead ship of the Ekaterina II-class ironclad battleships built for the Imperial Russian Navy in the 1880s. Her crew was considered unreliable when the crew of the pre-dreadnought battleship Potemkin mutinied in June 1905 (Note: All dates used in this article are New Style.) and her engines were decoupled from the propellers to prevent them from joining Potemkin. She was turned over to the Sevastopol port authorities before being stricken on 14 August 1907. She was re-designated as Stricken Vessel Nr. 3 on 22 April 1912 before being sunk as a torpedo target for the Black Sea Fleet.

== Design and description ==
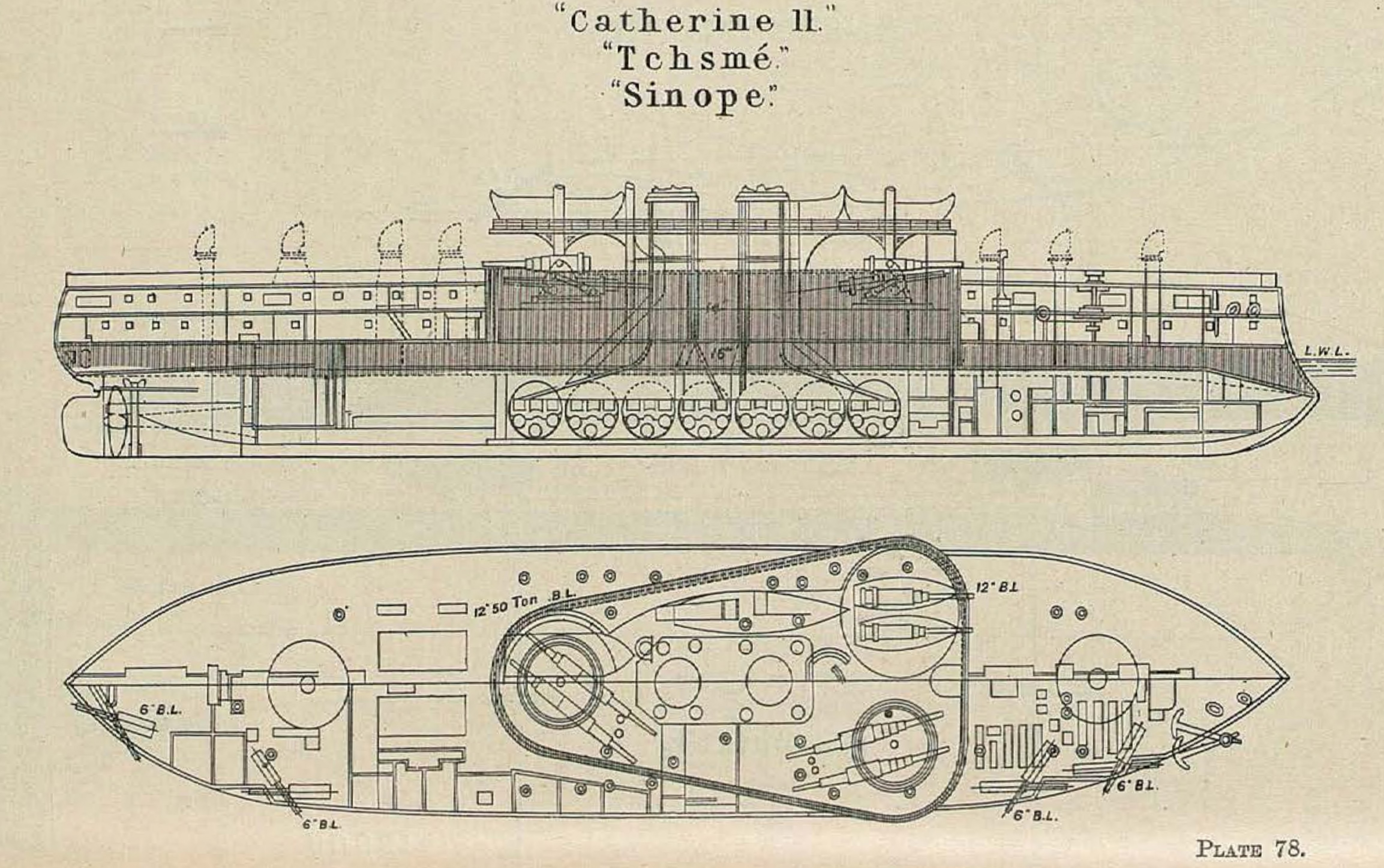
Right elevation and deck plan as depicted in Brassey's Naval Annual 1896

Ekaterina II was 331 feet 8.5 inches (101.1 m) long at the waterline and 339 feet 3 inches (103.40 m) long overall. She had a beam of 68 feet 11 inches (21.0 m) and a draft of 27 feet 11 inches (8.5 m), 24 inches (610 mm) more than designed. Her displacement was 11,050 long tons (11,230 t) at load, almost 900 long tons (910 t) more than her designed displacement of 10,181 long tons (10,344 t).

Ekaterina II had two 3-cylinder vertical compound steam engines built by the Baltic Works. Fourteen cylindrical boilers, also built by the Baltic Works, provided steam to the engines. The engines had a total designed output of 9,000 indicated horsepower (6,700 kW), but they produced 9,101 ihp (6,787 kW) on trials and gave a top speed of 15.25 knots (28.24 km/h; 17.55 mph). At full load she carried 900 long tons (910 t) of coal that provided her a range of 2,800 nautical miles (5,200 km; 3,200 mi) at a speed of 10 knots (19 km/h; 12 mph) and 1,367 nautical miles (2,532 km; 1,573 mi) at 14.5 knots (26.9 km/h; 16.7 mph).

Ekaterina II differed from her sisters mainly in her 12-inch (305 mm) gun mounts. Her guns used bulky, hydraulically powered Moncrieff disappearing gun mounts. They had a rate of fire of five minutes, ten seconds between aimed rounds. Each of the forward mounts could traverse 30° across the bow and 35° abaft the beam, or a total of 155°. Sixty rounds per gun were carried. The main guns were mounted very low, (only 4 feet 6 inches (1.4 m)) above the main deck, and caused extensive damage to the deck when fired over the bow or stern. The seven 6-inch (152 mm) Obukhov Model 1877 35-calibre guns were mounted on broadside pivot mounts in hull embrasures, except for one gun mounted in the stern in the hull. Six of the eight 47-millimeter (1.9 in) five-barrelled revolving Hotchkiss guns were mounted in small sponsons that projected from the hull with the aftermost pair mounted in embrasures in the hull to defend the ship against torpedo boats. Four 37-millimeter (1.5 in) five-barrelled revolving Hotchkiss guns were mounted in the fighting top. She carried seven above-water 14-inch (356 mm) torpedo tubes, one tube forward on each side, able to bear on forward targets, two other tubes mounted on each broadside forward and aft of the central citadel and the seventh tube was in the stern.

== History ==
Ekaterina II was named after the Empress Catherine II of Russia. She was the only one of her class to be built by the Nikolayev Admiralty Dockyard at Nikolaev. The ship was laid down on 26 June 1883, launched on 20 May 1886, and completed in 1889. She ran her first trials in 1888, after she had been transferred to Sevastopol to be fitted out, and spent her career with the Black Sea Fleet. In 1897 the Naval General Staff proposed to re-gun her with more powerful 12-inch 40-calibre guns and to replace the compound armour of her redoubt with Krupp armor, but this proved to be too expensive. Her machinery was upgraded between mid-1898 and 1902. Her boilers were replaced with eighteen Belleville water-tube boilers and her engines were converted to triple expansion. On trials after the refit she made 9,978 ihp (7,441 kW) and a speed of 15 knots (28 km/h; 17 mph) on 8 November 1902.

Her crew was considered sympathetic to the revolutionary movement when the crew of the battleship Potemkin mutinied in June 1905 and her engines were disabled to prevent her from joining Potemkin. She was turned over to the Sevastopol port authorities before being stricken on 14 August 1907. She was re-designated as Stricken Vessel Nr. 3 on 22 April 1912 before being sunk as a torpedo target. The remnants of the ship were salvaged in 1914 in Nikolaev.

== Bibliography ==
- Bascomb, Neal (2007). Red Mutiny: Eleven Fateful Days on the Battleship Potemkin. Boston: Houghton Mifflin.
- McLaughlin, Stephen (2003). Russian & Soviet Battleships. Annapolis, MD: Naval Institute Press. ISBN 1-55750-481-4.
- Watts, Anthony (1990). The Imperial Russian Navy. London, England: Arms and Armour Press. ISBN 0-85368-912-1.
- Taras, Alexander (2000). Корабли Российского императорского флота 1892–1917 гг [Ships of the Imperial Russian Navy 1892–1917]. Library of Military History (in Russian). Minsk: Kharvest. ISBN 985-433-888-6.
