= Russian battleship Sinop =

Russian Ekaterina II-class battleship

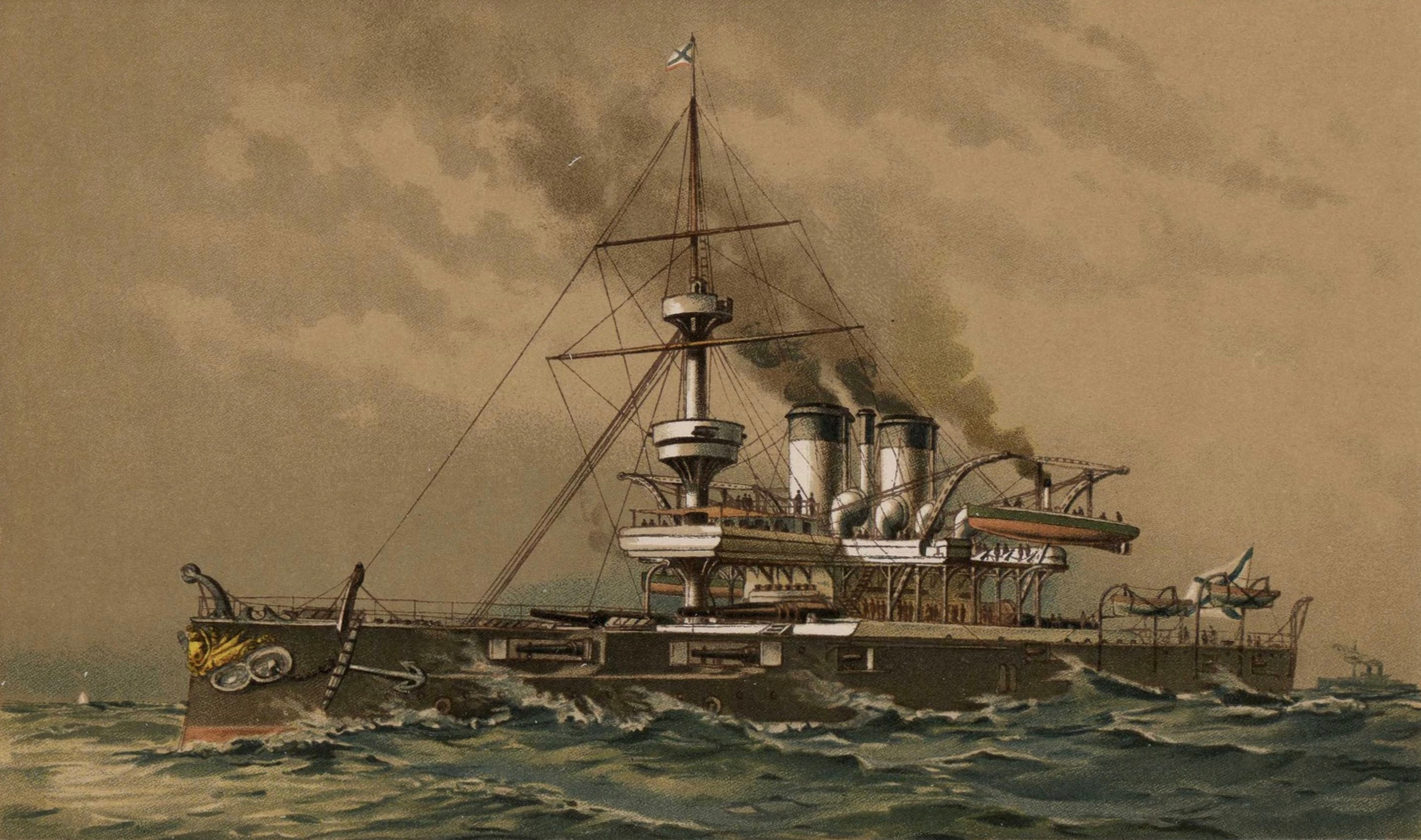
- Sinop as depicted in an 1893 lithograph

History

Russian Empire
- Name: Sinop (Синоп)
- Namesake: Battle of Sinop
- Operator: Imperial Russian Navy
- Ordered: 12 July 1882
- Builder: ROPiT Shipyard, Sevastopol
- Cost: 3,217,500 rubles
- Laid down: June 1883
- Launched: 1 June 1887
- Completed: 1889
- Out of service: 1919
- Fate: Sold for scrap 1922

General characteristics
- Class & type: Ekaterina II-class battleship
- Displacement: 11,310 long tons (11,491 t)
- Length: 339 ft 3 in (103.4 m)
- Beam: 68 ft 11 in (21.0 m)
- Draft: 28 ft 3 in (8.6 m)
- Installed power: 9,000 ihp (6,711 kW)
- Propulsion: 2 shafts; 2 vertical triple expansion steam engines; 14 cylindrical boilers
- Speed: 15 knots (28 km/h; 17 mph)
- Range: 2,800 nmi (5,200 km; 3,200 mi) at 10 knots (19 km/h; 12 mph)
- Complement: 633
- Armament: As built: 3 × 2 – 12-inch (305 mm) guns 7 × 1 – 6-inch (152 mm) guns 8 × 1 – 47-millimeter (1.9 in) 5-barrel revolving Hotchkiss guns 4 × 1 – 37-millimeter (1.5 in) 5-barrel revolving Hotchkiss guns 7 × 1 – 14-inch (356 mm) torpedo tubes After 1910 refit: 4 x 1 – 203 mm (8.0 in)/50 guns 12 x 1 – 152 mm (6.0 in)/45 canet guns 2 x 1 – 47 mm (1.9 in)/43 Hotchkiss guns 4 x 1 – 7.62/94 machine guns
- Armor: Compound armor; Belt: 6–16 in (152–406 mm); Deck: 2.25–2.5 in (57–64 mm); Barbette: 12 in (305 mm); Barbette hood: 1.5 in (38 mm); Conning tower: 9 in (229 mm); Bulkheads: 9–10 in (229–254 mm)

The Russian battleship Sinop (Russian: Синоп) was a battleship built for the Imperial Russian Navy, being the third ship of the Ekaterina II class. She was named after the Russian victory at the Battle of Sinop in 1853. The ship participated in the pursuit of the mutinous battleship Potemkin in June 1905 (Note: All dates used in this article are New Style.) and towed her back to Sevastopol from Constanța, Romania, where Potemkin had sought asylum. Several proposals were made for Sinop's reconstruction with modern guns and better quality armor during the 1900s, but both were cancelled. She was converted to a gunnery training ship in 1910 before she became a guardship at Sevastopol and had her 12-inch (305 mm) guns removed in exchange for four single 203 mm (8.0 in)/50 guns in turrets. Sinop was refitted in 1916 with torpedo bulges to act as "mine-bumpers" for a proposed operation in the heavily mined Bosphorus. Both the Bolsheviks and the Whites captured her during the Russian Civil War after her engines were destroyed by the British in 1919. She was scrapped by the Soviets beginning in 1922.

== Design and development ==
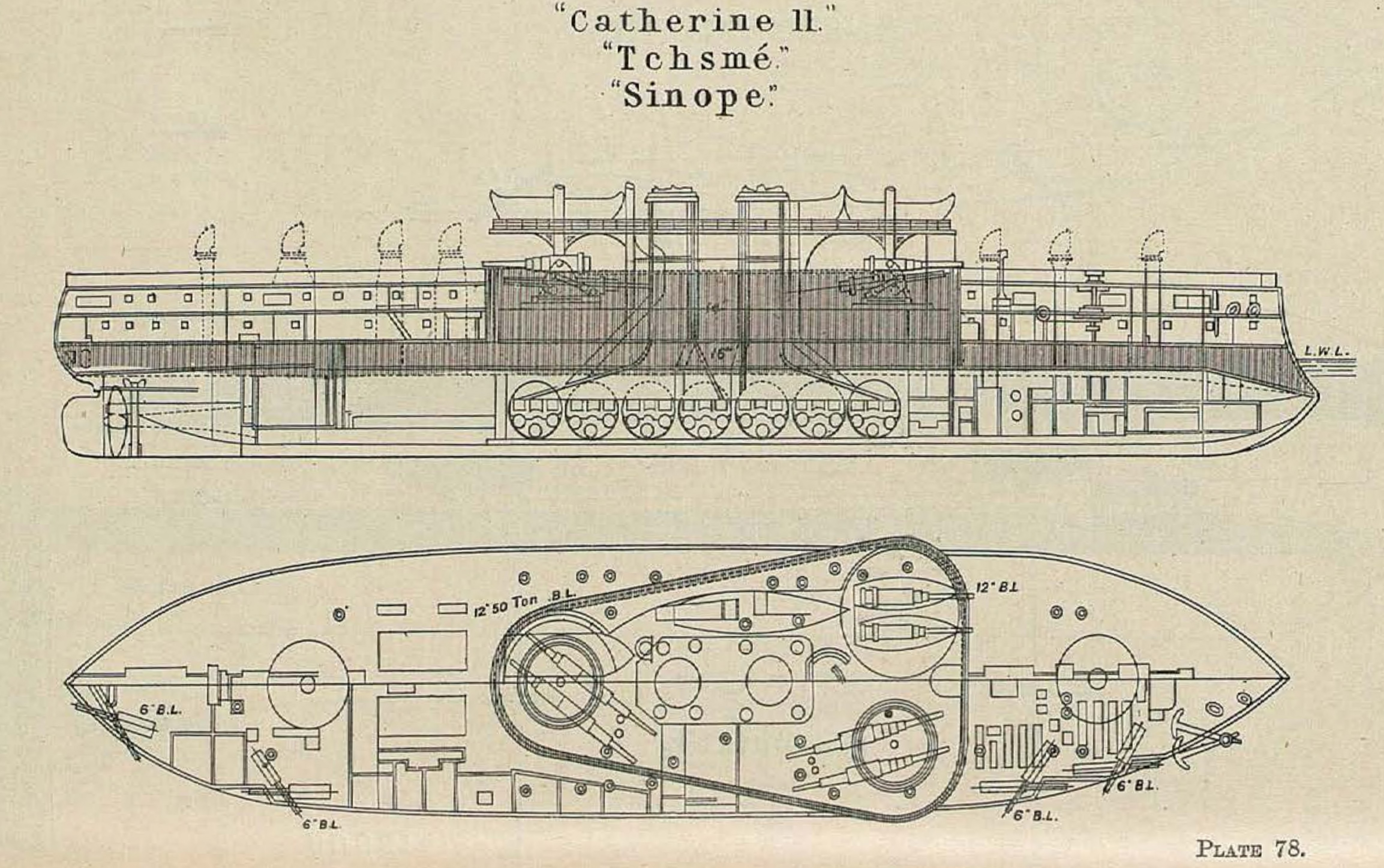
Right elevation and deck plan as depicted in Brassey's Naval Annual 1896

Sinop was 331 feet 8.5 inches (101.1 m) long at the waterline and 339 feet 3 inches (103.4 m) long overall. She had a beam of 68 feet 11 inches (21.0 m) and a draft of 28 ft 3 in (8.6 m) more than 28 inches (711 mm) than designed. Her displacement was 11,310 long tons (11,490 t) at load, over 1,200 long tons (1,200 t) more than her designed displacement of 10,181 long tons (10,344 t).

Sinop was the first large warship to use vertical triple expansion steam engines, having two 3-cylinder engines imported from Napier & Son of the United Kingdom. Fourteen cylindrical boilers provided steam to the engines. The engines had a total designed output of 9,000 indicated horsepower (6,711 kW), but they only produced 8,888 indicated horsepower (6,628 kW) on trials and gave a top speed of 15 knots (28 km/h; 17 mph). At full load she carried 900 long tons (910 t) of coal that provided her a range of 2,800 nautical miles (5,200 km; 3,200 mi) at a speed of 10 knots (19 km/h; 12 mph) and 1,367 nautical miles (2,532 km; 1,573 mi) at 14.5 knots (26.9 km/h; 16.7 mph).

She differed from her sisters mainly in the design of her gun mounts. Sinop had six 12-inch (305 mm) Obukhov Model 1877 30-caliber guns mounted in twin barbette mounts, two forward, side by side, and one aft. Each of the forward mounts could traverse 30° across the bow and 35° abaft the beam, or a total of 155°. The rear mount could traverse 202°. Their rate of fire was one round every four minutes, thirty-five seconds, including training time. Sixty rounds per gun were carried. The main guns were mounted very low, (only 4 feet 6 inches (1.4 m)) above the main deck, and caused extensive damage to the deck when fired over the bow or stern. The seven 6-inch (152 mm) Model 1877 35-caliber guns were mounted on broadside pivot mounts in hull embrasures, except for one gun mounted in the stern in the hull. Six of the eight 47-millimeter (1.9 in) five-barreled revolving Hotchkiss guns were mounted in small sponsons that projected from the hull with the aftermost pair mounted in hull embrasures to defend the ship against torpedo boats. Four 37-millimeter (1.5 in) five-barreled revolving Hotchkiss guns were mounted in the fighting top. She carried seven above-water 14-inch (356 mm) torpedo tubes, one tube forward on each side, able to bear on forward targets, two other tubes were mounted on each broadside fore and aft of the central citadel; the seventh tube was in the stern.

== History ==
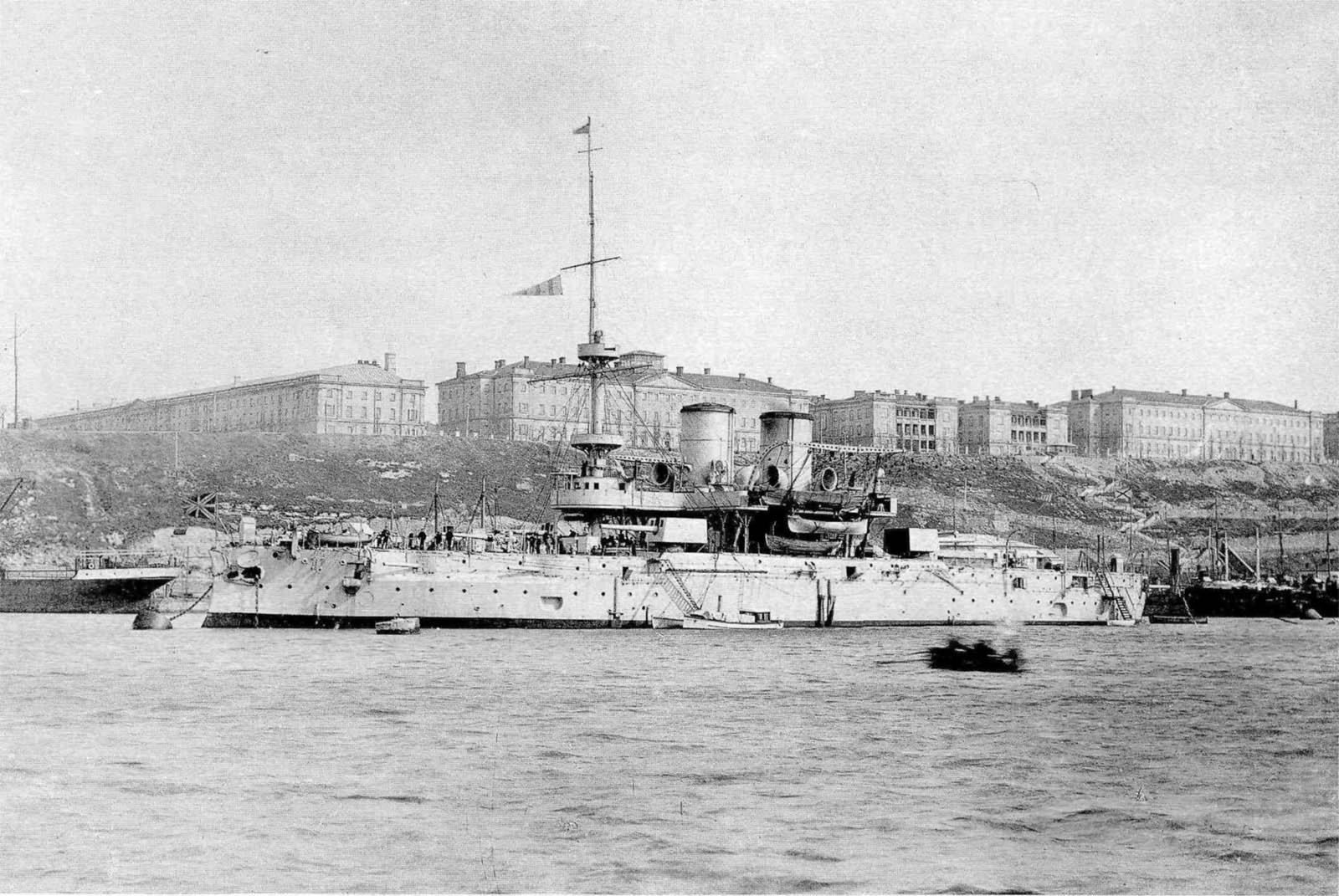
Sinop in 1916; note the prominent 8-inch gun turrets

Sinop was named after the Russian victory in the Battle of Sinop in 1853. She was built by the Russian Steam Navigation Company (RoPIT) at Sevastopol. She was laid down in late June 1883, launched on 1 June 1887, and completed in 1889. Sinop began her trials in the middle of 1889 and she had a boiler accident the following year that killed eight and severely burned 10 more. Her machinery was upgraded between 1899 and May 1904 with 20 new Belleville water-tube boilers, but the ship suffered a boiler explosion in 1903 that left seven sailors badly burned. Plans for a radical reconstruction were made to be done while she was docked for replacement boilers. It involved cutting her down by one deck and replacing her armament with two twin-gun turrets equipped with 12-inch 40-caliber guns and ten 6-inch 45-caliber guns between the turrets in an armored citadel that used Krupp armor. However, this proved to be too expensive and was cancelled.

Sinop participated in the pursuit of the mutinous battleship Potemkin in June 1905 and towed her back to Sevastopol from Constanța, Romania. In 1907 the Naval General Staff made a proposal for a radical reconstruction that was similar to the proposals to reconstruct her and her sister Chesma made before the Russo-Japanese War. This involved cutting her down by one deck and replacing her armament with two twin-gun turrets equipped with 12-inch 40-caliber guns and her compound armor replaced by Krupp armor. This new proposal differed from the older one in that eight 120-millimeter (4.7 in) guns replaced the ten 6-inch guns originally planned. This was also rejected as she still would have lacked the speed to stay with the main fleet and her armor was too obsolete to withstand modern high-explosive shell fire.

She was converted to a gunnery training ship in 1910 and had four 6-inch 45-caliber guns installed on her upper deck. Sinop's 12-inch guns were removed in 1912 and she received four single 203 mm (8.0 in) 50-caliber guns in turrets that were also mounted on the upper deck. The ship's original 6-inch 35-caliber guns were replaced with 45-caliber guns and two more were added in the Admiral's salon. Two more 47-mm guns were also added as were four machine guns. Her torpedo tubes were removed and Sinop also received a central fire control station. She spent World War I as a guardship at Sevastopol.

Sinop was refitted in Nikolaev with torpedo bulges to serve as 'mine-bumpers' in 1916 to allow her to lead other ships into the mined waters of the Bosphorus, but the operation was later cancelled. She was captured by the Germans in April 1918 in Sevastopol and was handed over to the Allies in November 1918. The British sabotaged her engines on 25 April 1919 as they abandoned the Whites to prevent any use by the advancing Bolsheviks. Sinop therefore remained at Sevastopol for the duration of the Russian Civil War, being captured by both sides as they occupied the city in turn, but was then abandoned by Wrangel's fleet when it evacuated the Crimea in 1920. Although Russian archives say that Sinop was gradually scrapped from 1922, an underwater expedition under the leadership of Robert Ballard found a wreck that has been tentatively identified as Sinop upside down off not far from Sevastopol.

== Notes ==
Footnotes

Citations
