= Russian battleship Navarin =

Russian pre-dreadnought battleship

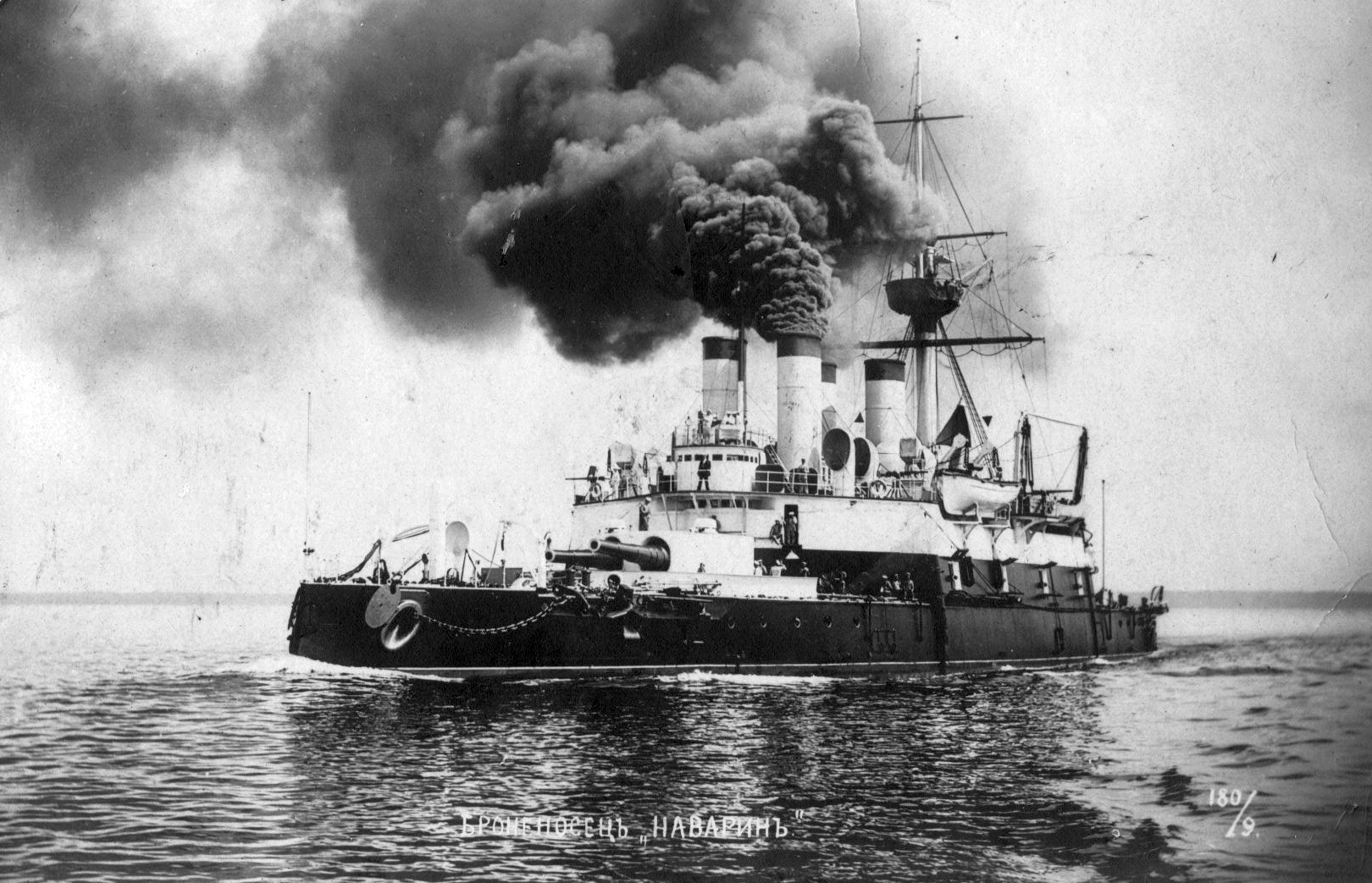
- Navarin underway at slow speed

Class overview
- Operators: Imperial Russian Navy
- Preceded by: Dvenadsat Apostolov
- Succeeded by: Tri Sviatitelia
- Built: 1890–1896
- In service: 1896–1905
- Completed: 1
- Lost: 1

History

Russian Empire
- Name: Navarin
- Namesake: Battle of Navarino
- Ordered: 24 April 1889 (Note: All dates used in this article are New Style)
- Builder: Franco-Russian Works, Saint Petersburg
- Laid down: 31 May 1890
- Launched: 20 October 1891
- In service: June 1896
- Nickname(s): Factory (Zavod)
- Fate: Sunk at the Battle of Tsushima, 28 May 1905

General characteristics
- Type: Pre-dreadnought battleship
- Displacement: 10,206 long tons (10,370 t)
- Length: 351 ft (107 m) (o/a)
- Beam: 67 ft (20.4 m)
- Draft: 27 ft 7 in (8.4 m)
- Installed power: 9,000 ihp (6,711 kW); 12 cylindrical boilers
- Propulsion: 2 shafts, 2 triple-expansion steam engines
- Speed: 15 knots (28 km/h; 17 mph)
- Range: 3,050 nmi (5,650 km; 3,510 mi) at 10 knots (19 km/h; 12 mph)
- Complement: 24 officers, 417 crewmen
- Armament: 2 × twin 12 in (305 mm) guns; 8 × single 6 in (152 mm) guns; 14 × single 47 mm (1.9 in) guns; 12 × single 37 mm (1.5 in) guns; 6 × 15 in (381 mm) torpedo tubes
- Armor: Compound armor; Waterline belt: 12–16 in (305–406 mm); Casemate: 5 in (127 mm); Gun turrets: 12 in (305 mm) (nickel steel); Conning tower: 10 in (254 mm)

Navarin (Russian: Наварин) was a pre-dreadnought battleship built for the Imperial Russian Navy in the late 1880s and early 1890s. The ship was assigned to the Baltic Fleet and spent the early part of her career deployed in the Mediterranean and in the Far East. She participated in the suppression of the Boxer Rebellion in 1900 before returning to the Baltic Fleet in 1901. Several months after the beginning of the Russo-Japanese War in February 1904, she was assigned to the 2nd Pacific Squadron to relieve the Russian forces blockaded in Port Arthur. During the Battle of Tsushima in May 1905, she was sunk by Japanese destroyers which spread twenty-four linked mines across her path during the night. Navarin struck two of these mines and capsized with the loss of most of her crew.

== Design and description ==
Navarin was a low-freeboard turret ship modeled on the British Trafalgar-class battleships. The original requirement had been for a much smaller ship, but the Navy changed its mind and required a larger ship capable of operating "in all European seas and [even be] able by its coal capacity to reach the Far East." Changes were made to the design after the ship was ordered that included the replacement of the main armament by more powerful guns of the same caliber and the increase in the secondary armament from six guns to eight.

The ship was 347 feet 6 inches (105.9 m) long at the waterline and 351 feet (107 m) long overall. She had a beam of 67 feet (20.4 m) and a draught of 27 feet 7 inches (8.4 m). She displaced 10,206 long tons (10,370 t), almost 800 long tons (813 t) more than her designed displacement of 9,476 long tons (9,628 t). Navarin's crew consisted of 24 officers and 417 enlisted men.

She had a pair of three-cylinder vertical triple-expansion steam engines, each driving one propeller shaft. They had a total designed output of 9,000 indicated horsepower (6,700 kW) using steam provided by 12 cylindrical fire-tube boilers at a pressure of 9.4 atm (952 kPa; 138 psi). The four boiler rooms were arranged in two pairs abreast, each of which had its own funnel. This unusual arrangement gave the ship her odd nickname of Factory (Zavod). Trials of the first batch of boilers in May 1891 showed that they could not maintain the designed steam pressure due to flaws in their construction. The Navy demanded that the Franco-Russian Works replace them with new boilers at its own expense, but tests of the new boilers in August 1893 showed that their production of steam was inadequate. The factory asked for a year's time to rectify the problems which the Navy granted since the construction of the ship was already behind schedule. On her final set of sea trials in November 1895, Navarin reached a top speed of 15.85 knots (29.35 km/h; 18.24 mph). She carried a maximum of 1,200 long tons (1,200 t) of coal that provided a range of 3,050 nautical miles (5,650 km; 3,510 mi) at a speed of 10 knots (19 km/h; 12 mph).

=== Armament ===
The ship's main battery consisted of four 35-caliber 12-inch (305 mm) Obukhov Model 1886 guns mounted in hydraulically powered twin-gun turrets fore and aft of the superstructure. The guns required 2 minutes, 22 seconds between shots. They fired a 731.3-pound (331.7 kg) "light" shell at a muzzle velocity of 2,090 ft/s (637 m/s). Each gun was provided with 80 rounds. Her secondary armament of eight 35-caliber 6-inch (152 mm) Pattern 1877 guns were mounted in casemates in the superstructure. The ship carried a total of 1,600 rounds for them.

Navarin was protected against torpedo boats by a suite of smaller guns that included fourteen quick-firing (QF) 47-millimetre (1.9 in) Hotchkiss guns mounted in the superstructure. They fired a 3-pound-3-ounce (1.4 kg) shell at a muzzle velocity of 1,867 ft/s (569 m/s). A total of eight Maxim QF 37-millimetre (1.5 in) guns were mounted in the fighting top and the other four guns may have been used to arm the ship's boats. They fired a 1-pound (0.45 kg) shell at a muzzle velocity of 1,319 ft/s (402 m/s). Navarin was also armed with six above-water 15-inch (381 mm) torpedo tubes, one each in the bow and stern and one pair on each broadside. The ship carried two torpedoes for each tube.

=== Protection ===
The ship used compound armor for all armored vertical surfaces except for the gun turrets which were made from nickel steel. The maximum thickness of the waterline armor belt was 16 inches (406 mm) which reduced to 12–14 inches (305–356 mm) abreast the magazines. It covered 228 feet (69.5 m) of the ship's length and was 7 feet (2.1 m) high, and tapered down to a thickness of 8 inches (203 mm) at the bottom edge. The upper 18 inches (457.2 mm) of the belt was intended to be above the waterline, but the ship was significantly overweight and much of the belt was submerged. The belt terminated in 14–16-inch (356–406 mm) transverse bulkheads.

The lower casemate was above the belt, 218 feet (66.4 m) long and 8 feet (2.4 m) high, and was intended to protect the bases of the turrets and everything between them. It had 16-inch sides and was closed off by 16-inch transverse bulkheads fore and aft. The upper casemate protected the six-inch guns and was 5 inches (127 mm) thick on all sides. The armor plates of the turret sides were 16 inches thick and the conning tower had sides that were 12 inches (305 mm) thick. The armor deck was 2 inches (51 mm) thick over the lower casemate, but 2.5 inches (64 mm) thick forward and aft of the main armor belt to the bow and stern.

== Construction and career ==
Navarin, named after the Battle of Navarino, was ordered on 24 April 1889 from the Franco-Russian Works and construction began on 13 July 1889 at their Saint Petersburg shipyard. The ship was laid down on 31 May 1890 and launched on 20 October 1891. She was transferred to Kronstadt in 1893 for fitting out, but did not enter service until June 1896 at a cost of over nine million rubles. Construction was seriously delayed by problems with the boilers and late deliveries of armor plates, the gun mountings, and other components, compounded by inefficiencies in building. One example of such was that the Russian armor plate company lacked the capacity to make gun port armor for the gun turrets of the required thickness, but the builder somehow lost track of this fact and had to place a rush order with the French company of St. Chamond.

Navarin was assigned to the Baltic Fleet and began a cruise to the Mediterranean Sea in August 1896. She visited the Greek port of Piraeus on 1 October. Together with the battleship Sissoi Veliky, the ship was ordered to the Far East in early 1898 and arrived at Port Arthur on 28 March. She took part in the suppression of the Boxer Rebellion two years later. Navarin and Sissoi Veliky, together with a number of cruisers, sailed for the Baltic on 25 December 1901 and arrived at the port of Libau in early May 1902. She began a refit the following September that was interrupted by the start of the Russo-Japanese War in February 1904. During this refit, Navarin received 4.5-foot (1.4 m) Barr & Stroud rangefinders, telescopic gun sights and Telefunken radio equipment. Her light armament was increased by four 75-millimeter (3.0 in) guns that displaced an equal number of 47-millimeter guns on top of the superstructure; one of the displaced guns was mounted on each of the turret roofs.

On 15 October 1904, she set sail for Port Arthur from Libau along with the other vessels of the Second Pacific Squadron, under the command of Admiral Zinovy Rozhestvensky. When his ships reached the port of Tangier, Morocco, on 28 October, Rozhestvensky split his forces and ordered his older ships, including Navarin and Sissoi Veliky, to proceed through the Mediterranean and the Suez Canal to rendezvous with him in Madagascar as previously planned. Under the command of Rear Admiral Dmitry von Fölkersam, they departed that night and reached Souda Bay, Crete, a week later and Port Said, Egypt two weeks after that. The two forces reunited at the island of Nosy Be on 9 January 1905 where they remained for two months while Rozhestvensky finalized his coaling arrangements. The squadron sailed for Camranh Bay, French Indochina, on 16 March and reached it almost a month later to await the obsolete ships of the 3rd Pacific Squadron, commanded by Rear Admiral Nikolai Nebogatov. The latter ships reached Camranh Bay on 9 May and the combined force sailed for Vladivostok on 14 May.

Rozhestvensky reorganized his ships into three divisions; the first consisted of the four new Borodino-class battleships commanded by himself, von Fölkersam commanded the second division of the battleships Oslyabya, Navarin, Sissoi Veliky and the armored cruiser Admiral Nakhimov, and Nebogatov retained his ships as the third division. Von Fölkersam, ill with cancer, died on 26 May and Rozhestvensky decided not to inform the fleet in order to keep morale up. The captain of Oslyabya became the commander of the 2nd Division while Nebogatov had no idea that he was now the squadron's de facto second-in-command.

Very little is known of Navarin's actions during the Battle of Tsushima on 27–28 May as there were very few survivors from the ship and visibility was poor for most of the battle. The ship was apparently not heavily engaged during the early part of the battle, but was badly damaged later in the day when she was third from last in the Russian line of battle. She was hit four times by large-caliber shells on the waterline that caused major flooding aft. Her quarterdeck was awash up to her rear 12-inch turret by 2100 and the ship was forced to stop for repairs. Around that time she was attacked by Japanese torpedo boats that may have made one or two torpedo hits. Navarin managed to get underway again and damaged one torpedo boat badly enough that she sank later that night. Around 0200 on 28 May, the ship was attacked again by the Fourth Destroyer Division which dropped six strings of mines ahead of her. These consisted of four mines linked together with cables so that hitting any part of the string would draw the mines onto the ship. Two of these mines struck Navarin, which quickly capsized and sank. Some 70 men were able to abandon ship before she sank, but only three were alive when they were found 16 hours later. One man was rescued by a Japanese torpedo boat while the other two were rescued by a British merchant ship. The rest of her crew of 674 officers and enlisted men were lost. The rescued men had said that when they called out for help, they were fired on by Japanese torpedo boats.
