= Ekaterina II-class battleship =

Imperial Russian Navy ships

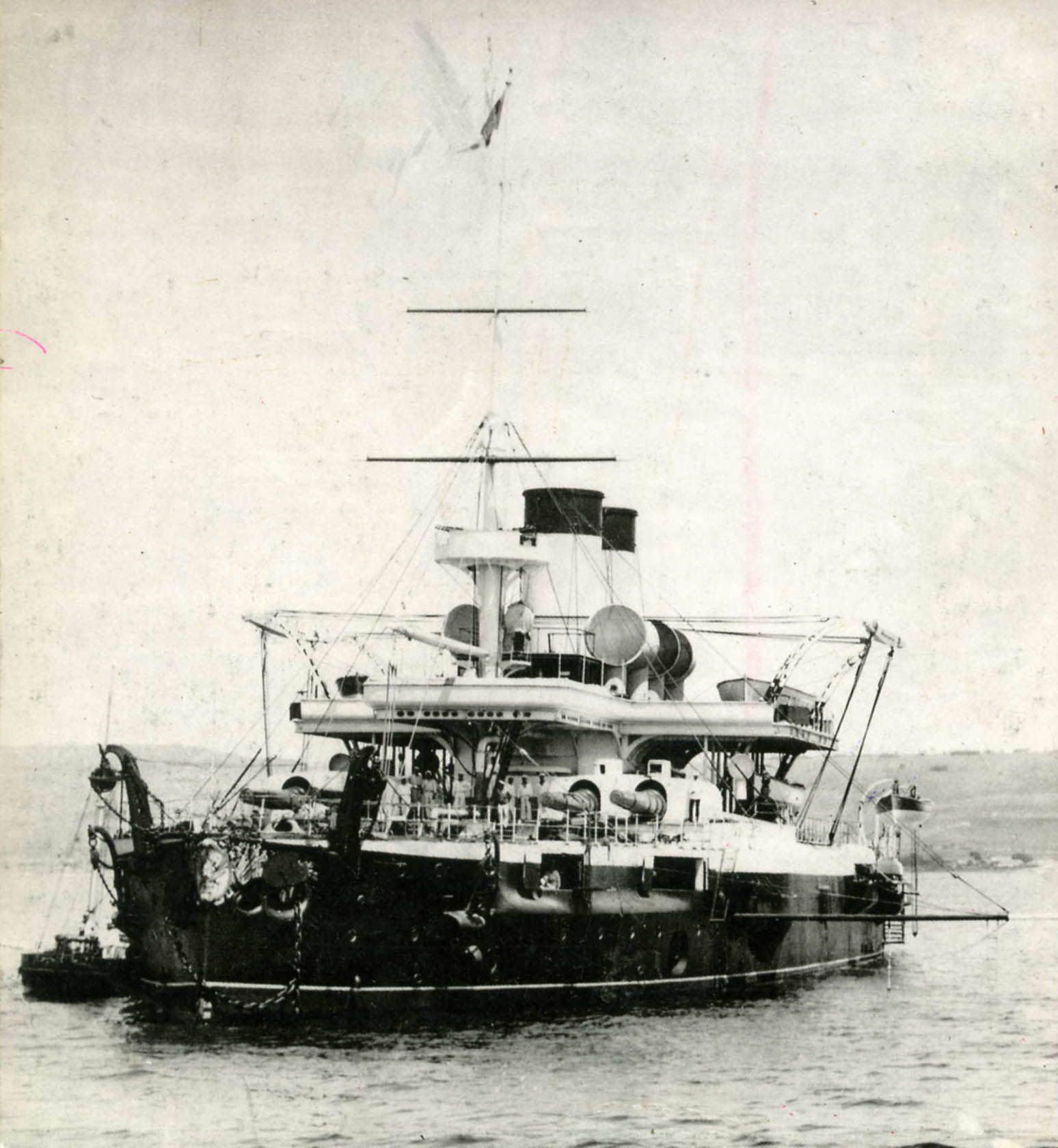
- Chesma, showing both forward barbettes

Class overview
- Name: Ekaterina II class
- Builders: RoPIT, Sevastopol (3); Nikolayev Admiralty, Nikolayev (1)
- Operators: Imperial Russian Navy
- Succeeded by: Imperator Aleksandr II class
- Subclasses: Georgii Pobedonosets
- Built: 1883–94
- In commission: 1889–1919
- Completed: 4
- Scrapped: 4

General characteristics
- Type: Battleship
- Displacement: 11,050–11,396 long tons (11,227–11,579 t)
- Length: 339 ft 3 in (103.40 m)
- Beam: 68 ft 11 in (21.01 m)
- Draft: 27.92–28.83 ft (8.51–8.79 m)
- Installed power: 14 or 16 cylindrical boilers; 9,000 ihp (6,711 kW)
- Propulsion: 2 shafts; 2 compound or triple-expansion steam engines
- Speed: 15–16.5 knots (27.8–30.6 km/h; 17.3–19.0 mph)
- Range: 2,800 nmi (5,200 km; 3,200 mi) at 10 knots (19 km/h; 12 mph)
- Complement: 633–642
- Armament: 3 × twin 12 in (305 mm) guns; 7 × single 6 in (152 mm) guns; 8 × single 47 mm (1.9 in) 5-barrel revolving Hotchkiss guns; 4 × single 37 mm (1.5 in) 5-barrel revolving Hotchkiss guns; 7 × single 14 in (360 mm) torpedo tubes
- Armor: Belt: 8–16 in (203–406 mm); Redoubt: 12 in (300 mm); Decks: 2–2.5 in (51–64 mm); Gun shields: 2–3 in (51–76 mm)

The Ekaterina II class were a class of four battleships built for the Imperial Russian Navy in the 1880s; the first such ships built for the Black Sea Fleet. Their design was highly unusual in having the main guns on three barbettes grouped in a triangle around a central armored redoubt, two side-by-side forward and one on the centerline aft. This was intended to maximize their firepower forward, both when operating in the narrow waters of the Bosphorus and when ramming. Construction was slow because they were the largest warships built until then in the Black Sea, and the shipyards had to be upgraded to handle them.

All four ships were in Sevastopol when the crew of the battleship Potemkin mutinied in June 1905. (Note: All dates used in this article are New Style.) Ekaterina II's crew was considered unreliable, and she was disabled to prevent her from joining the mutiny. Chesma's crew was also considered unreliable, but she did escort Potemkin as Sinop towed her back to Sevastopol from Constanța, Romania, where Potemkin's crew had sought asylum. Sinop and Georgii Pobedonosets both pursued Potemkin to Odessa, but the crew of the latter mutinied themselves in sympathy with the crew of the Potemkin. However, loyal members of the crew regained control of the ship the next day and grounded her.

A number of proposals were made in the 1900s to reconstruct them and replace their obsolete armor and guns, but none of these were carried out. Ekaterina II and Chesma were both eventually sunk as target ships after being decommissioned in 1907, but both Sinop and Georgii Pobedonosets were converted into artillery training ships before becoming guardships at Sevastopol before World War I. There they spent most of the war and were captured by the Germans in 1918, who eventually turned them over to the British, who sabotaged their engines when they abandoned the Crimea in 1919. Immobile, they were captured by both the Whites and the Bolsheviks during the Russian Civil War. Sinop was abandoned when Wrangel's fleet sailed for Bizerte, but Georgii Pobedonosets was towed there. Sinop was scrapped beginning in 1922 by the Soviets, while Georgii Pobedonosets was eventually scrapped in Bizerte beginning in 1930 by the French.

== Design ==
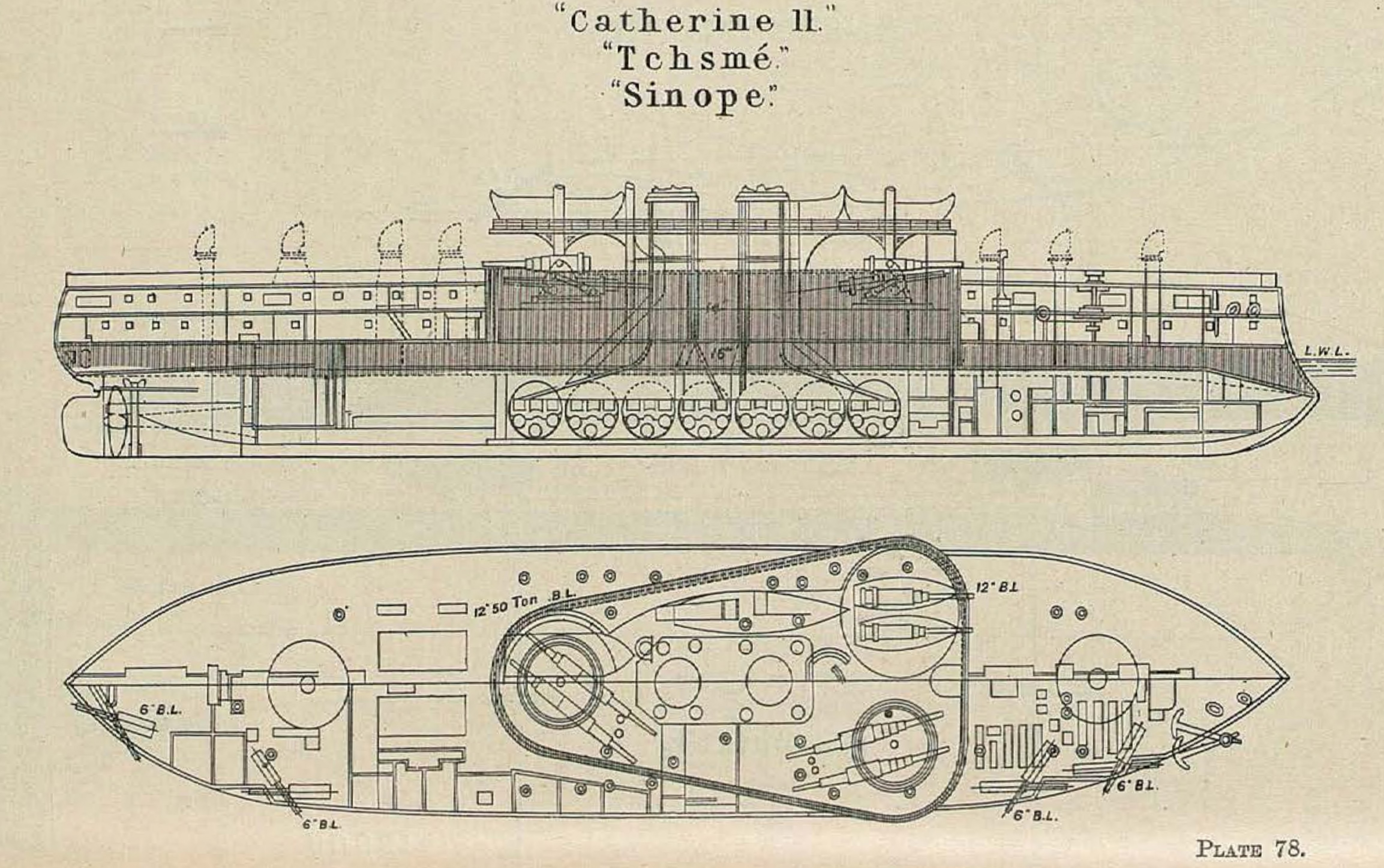
Right elevation and deck plan as depicted in Brassey's Naval Annual 1896

The Ekaterina II-class battleships were intended to support an amphibious assault on the Bosphorus and to oppose any attempt of the British Mediterranean Fleet to force the Bosphorus and enter the Black Sea. This meant that they would have to engage Turkish coastal artillery batteries and warships in the narrow confines of the Turkish Straits. This put a premium on forward-facing guns because ships might not be able to turn to bring their broadsides to bear on the enemy. Three gun mounts, two forward and one in the rear, were settled upon relatively early in the design process, but the number of guns and the choice between turrets or barbettes was the subject of much debate. The Russians had been impressed by the performance of the barbette-mounted disappearing guns of HMS Temeraire during the bombardment of Alexandria in 1882 and began to seriously consider the use of this type of installation in their new battleships. The lighter weight of barbettes versus turrets allowed for the addition of several 9-inch (229 mm) guns, but it was later realized that they could be deleted in exchange for twin gun mounts in the barbettes for very little cost in weight.

Construction had already begun when the armor scheme was revised after a visit to France by two naval constructors. Upon their return they argued for a complete waterline armor belt to preserve the ship's buoyancy and speed if it was hit fore and aft. The original armor scheme was very close to British practice, with a short, very thick waterline belt that covered the machinery and magazines, but left the ends unprotected other than by an armored deck. Their suggestions were incorporated in the ships, but the armor scheme had to be drastically revised to cater for the complete armor belt. The maximum thickness was reduced from 18 inches (457 mm) to 16 inches (406 mm) and the belt reduced to 8 inches (203 mm) at the bow and stern with a 6-inch (152 mm) strake on the upper side of the ram bow. The middle 12-inch (305 mm) redoubt was shortened from a length about 130 feet (40 m) to 100 feet (30 m), just enough to cover the ammunition hoists and the funnel uptakes to save weight. Even so, the design displacement increased to 10,190 long tons (10,354 t), which increased draft by 5 inches (127 mm).

Originally only three ships were going to be built in the class, but Georgii Pobedonosets was built to a modified Ekaterina II design when a more modern design could not be prepared in a timely manner after Sinop was launched. She mainly differed from her half-sisters in her armor layout and composition.

=== General characteristics ===
The Ekaterina II-class ships were 331 feet 8.5 inches (101.105 m) long at the waterline and 339 ft 3 in (103.40 m) long overall. They had a beam of 68 ft 11 in (21.01 m) and a draft of 27.92 to 28.83 ft (8.51 to 8.79 m). They were significantly overweight and displaced 11,050 to 11,396 long tons (11,227 to 11,579 t) at load, over 1,000 long tons (1,000 t) more than their designed displacement of 10,190 long tons (10,354 t). The hull was subdivided by one centerline longitudinal bulkhead, extending from frames 17 to 65, and ten transverse watertight bulkheads. It also had a complete double bottom. The only known stability figure is from Sinop in 1908 which had a metacentric height of 4 feet (1.2 m).

=== Propulsion ===
Ekaterina II and Chesma had two three-cylinder vertical compound steam engines, powered by fourteen cylindrical boilers. Sinop and Georgii Pobedonosets had vertical triple-expansion steam engines, Sinop being the first large warship in the world to use them, with either fourteen (Sinop) or sixteen (Georgii Pobedonosets) cylindrical boilers providing steam. All of the engines were imported from either France or the United Kingdom, except for those of the Ekaterina II which were built by the Baltic Works. Their total designed output ranged from 8,500 to 10,500 indicated horsepower (6,338 to 7,830 kW). On trials, the ships had top speeds of about 15–16 knots (28–30 km/h; 17–18 mph). They carried 900 long tons (914 t) of coal at full load that provided a range of 2,800 nautical miles (5,186 km; 3,222 mi) at a speed of 10 knots (19 km/h; 12 mph) and 1,367 nautical miles (2,532 km; 1,573 mi) at a speed of 14.5 knots (26.9 km/h; 16.7 mph).

=== Armament ===
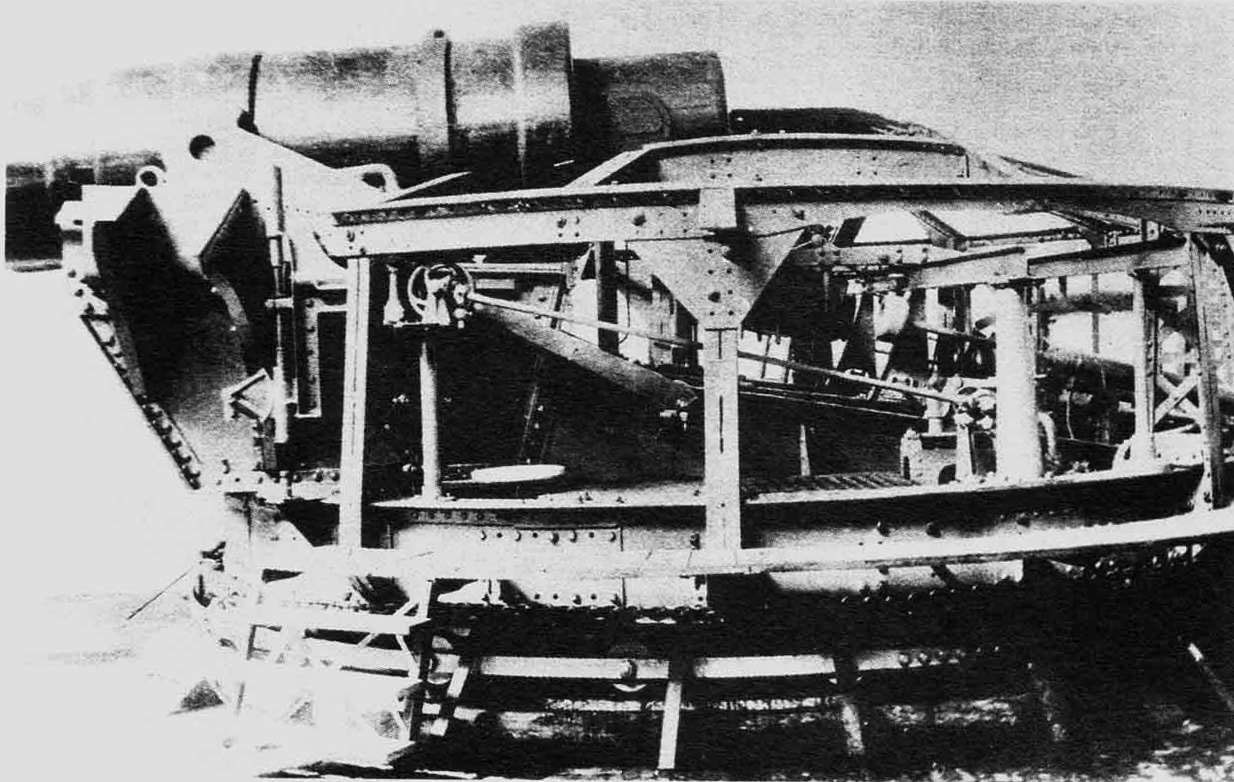
One of Sinop's 12-inch gun mounts at the factory

The main armament of the Ekaterina II-class ships consisted of three pairs of 12-inch (305 mm) guns mounted in twin-gun barbettes. In an arrangement very unusual for such large guns, two barbettes were placed forward side-by-side, while the third barbette was aft of the superstructure. Each of the forward mounts could traverse 30° across the bow and 35° abaft the beam, or a total of 155°. The rear mount could traverse 202°. The main guns were mounted very low, (only 4 feet 6 inches (1.37 m)) above the main deck, and caused extensive damage to the deck when fired over the bow or stern. Two different guns were used; Ekaterina II and Sinop had 30-caliber Pattern 1877 guns while Chesma and Georgii Pobedonosets had 35-caliber Obukhov Pattern 1886 guns. Both guns had elevation limits of −2° to +15°. Their rate of fire was about one round every four to five minutes, including training time, and 60 rounds per gun were carried. Each ship had a different type of mount inside the barbette; Ekaterina II used bulky, hydraulically powered Moncrieff disappearing gun mounts which proved to be larger than estimated and the outer edges of the armored redoubt had to be carried out over the ships' sides on sponsons on the first two ships completed, Ekaterina II and Chesma, although Chesma's guns were not disappearing. By the time that Sinop and Georgii Pobedonosets were finished the gun mount had been reduced in size enough that the sponsons could be eliminated. But the new and smaller redoubt proved to be too small for the 12-inch 35-caliber gun and Sinop had to use the older 30-caliber weapon. In contrast the Georgii Pobedonosets's redoubt was designed to use the newer gun. Chesma's guns were mounted on unbalanced turntables and they caused her to list when the guns were trained to one side. Traversing all the guns as far as they could go to one side produced a list of 7.6° and made it very difficult for the turntable machinery to rotate the guns back to the fore-and-aft position. This problem had been anticipated and water tanks had been added to counteract the list, but they proved to be virtually useless because they took up to two hours to fill. The problem was partially cured in 1892 when the equipment was rearranged on the turntable to improve their balance, but more thorough solutions to the problem were either deemed too expensive or inadequate.

The 30 calibers long Pattern 1877 gun fired a 731.3-pound (331.7 kg) shell at a muzzle velocity of 1,870 ft/s (570 m/s) to a range of 5,570 yards (5,090 m) at an elevation of 6°. The 35 calibers long Pattern 1886 gun had a muzzle velocity of 2,090 ft/s (640 m/s) with a 731.3-pound (331.7 kg) shell. It had a range of 11,600 yards (10,600 m) at maximum elevation. They also had a 'heavy' shell available that weighed 1,003 lb (455 kg) that was fired at a velocity of 2,000 ft/s (610 m/s) although the range is not available.

The seven 6-inch (152 mm) Model 1877 35-caliber guns were mounted on broadside pivot mounts in hull embrasures, except for one gun mounted in the stern in the hull. They were provided with 125 rounds per gun. These guns had a maximum elevation of 15° and could depress 5°. They fired a 'light' shell that weighed 277–280 lb (126–127 kg) or a 415-pound (188 kg) 'heavy' shell. The muzzle velocity achieved depended on the shell weight and the type of propellant. A 'light' shell with brown powder reached 2,142 ft/s (653 m/s) while that same shell with smokeless powder achieved 2,326 ft/s (709 m/s). In contrast a 'heavy' shell with brown powder could only be propelled at a velocity of 1,867 ft/s (569 m/s). A 277 lb 'light' shell had a maximum range of 10,330 yards (9,450 m) when fired at an elevation of 15° with smokeless powder.

Six of the eight 47-millimeter (1.9 in) five-barreled revolving Hotchkiss guns were mounted in small sponsons that projected from the hull with the aftermost pair mounted in embrasures in the hull in Ekaterina II and Chesma to defend the ship against torpedo boats. In Sinop they were all mounted in hull embrasures while Georgii Pobedonosets's eight single-barreled guns were mounted on the battery deck. They fired a 3.3-pound (1.5 kg) shell at a muzzle velocity of 1,476 ft/s (450 m/s) at a rate of 30 rounds per minute to a range of 2,020 yards (1,850 m). Georgii Pobedonosets also had ten 37-millimeter (1.5 in) single-barreled Hotchkiss guns in her fighting top, but the older three ships mounted four 5-barreled guns. They fired a 1.1-pound (0.50 kg) shell at a muzzle velocity of 1,450 ft/s (440 m/s) at a rate of 32 rounds per minute to a range of 3,038 yards (2,778 m). They all carried seven above-water 14-inch (356 mm) torpedo tubes, three tubes on each broadside plus a tube in the stern.

=== Armor ===
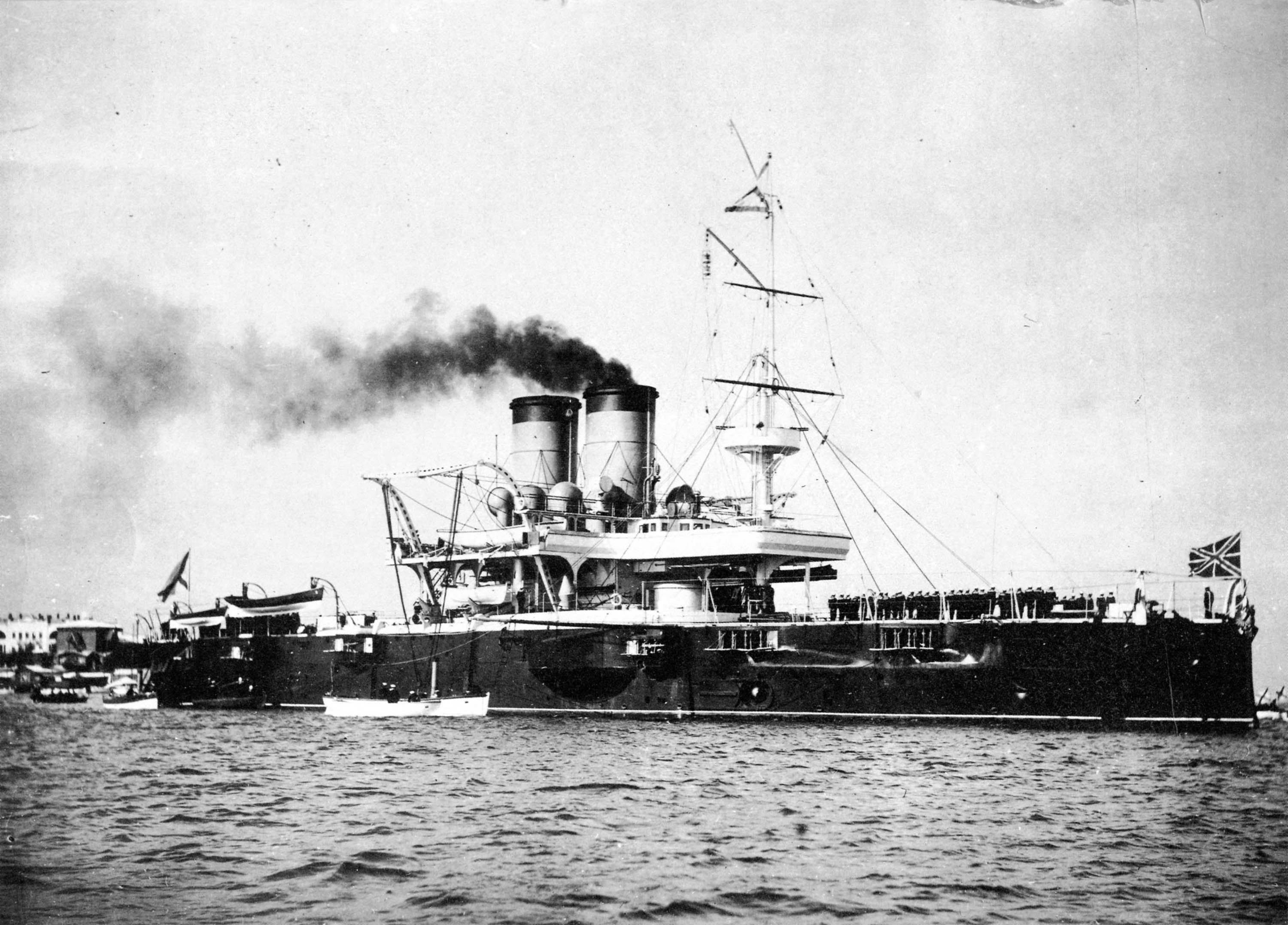
Ekaterina II in 1902

The Ekaterina II-class ships were originally designed with a short, heavily armored, central citadel, but this was changed during construction to a full waterline belt. The three older ships used compound armor imported from Charles Cammell & Co. of the United Kingdom. The maximum thickness of the belt was 16 inches which reduced, in 2-inch (51 mm) steps, to eight inches at the bow and stern. The belt was 8 feet (2.4 m) high, and tapered down to a thickness of six inches at the bottom edge for the 16-inch plates. The upper 3 feet (0.9 m) of the belt was intended to be above the waterline, but the ships were overweight and much of the belt was submerged. For example, Ekaterina II only had 13 inches (330 mm) above the waterline. The central citadel was above the belt, 100 feet (30.5 m) long and 8 feet 6 inches (3 m) high. It had 12-inch sides and was closed off by a 10-inch (254 mm) forward bulkhead (partition) and a 9-inch (230 mm) rear bulkhead. The triangular redoubt was 9 feet 6 inches (3 m) high and protected the guns with plates 12 inches thick. Sinop's redoubt was about 15 inches (381.0 mm) shorter to save weight. Armored hoods were fitted over the barbettes to protect the crews from small arms and splinters. Ekaterina II's was 1.5 inches (38 mm) thick, but those of Chesma and Sinop were 1.5–2.5 inches (38–64 mm) thick. The 6-inch guns and torpedoes were completely unprotected. The thickness of the conning tower's sides varied between the ships; it was six inches on Ekaterina II, eight inches on Chesma and nine inches on Sinop. The armor deck was 2.5 inches (64 mm) thick over the citadel, but only 2.25 inches (57 mm) elsewhere.

In contrast to her half-sisters the armor used on Georgii Pobedonosets was steel. The belt armor had a maximum thickness 12 inches which thinned, in two-inch steps, down to six inches forward and eight inches aft. Its height was reduced by 1 foot (0.30 m) in comparison to the other ships of the class to 7 feet (2.1 m) to save weight. However this left only six inches of her belt above her loaded waterline as she was still overweight, a decrease of 7 inches (177.8 mm) from her half-sisters. The deck armor was 2.25 inches outside the citadel and 1.5 inches over it.

== Construction and service ==
Ekaterina II was built at the Admiralty Shipyard in Nikolayev. The other three ships were built in Sevastopol by the Russian Steam Navigation and Trading Company. The Admiralty Shipyard was not yet ready to build such a large ship and required additional preparations before it was ready to begin Ekaterina II. Some delays were caused by the necessity to send some equipment from St. Petersburg, but the primary reason for the lengthy six-year construction time were near-constant design changes after building had begun. The gun mountings were found to be larger than anticipated and the redoubt had to be carried out over the ship's sides on sponsons to make enough room. The frontal armor thickness of the redoubt was reduced from 14 inches (356 mm) to 12 inches in compensation. The redoubt also had to be moved back about 10 feet (3 m) to prevent the ships from trimming by the head and the armor was rearranged as mentioned earlier.

=== Modernizations ===
The boilers of each ship were replaced by Belleville water-tube boilers around the turn of the century during lengthy refit periods. Several different proposals were made during this period or later to reconstruct the ships and make them effective combatants again. These often involved replacing their compound or steel armor with modern Krupp armor, replacing their guns and barbettes with a pair of twin turrets mounting more powerful 12-inch guns and, most radically, to cut the ships down by one deck. None of these proposals were ever carried although the armor and new turrets were actually ordered for Chesma, but the Navy reconsidered the cost-effectiveness of the modernization and diverted both to the battleship Ioann Zlatoust then building.

=== Ekaterina II ===
Ekaterina II (Екатерина II) was named after the Empress Catherine II of Russia. She was built by the Admiralty Dockyard at Nikolaev. She was laid down on 26 June 1883, launched on 20 May 1886, and completed in 1889. Her crew was considered unreliable when the crew of the battleship Potemkin mutinied in June 1905 and her engines were decoupled from the propellers to prevent her from joining Potemkin. She was turned over to the Sevastopol port authorities before being stricken on 14 August 1907. She was redesignated as Stricken Vessel Nr. 3 on 22 April 1912 before being sunk as a torpedo target.

=== Chesma ===
Chesma (Чесма) was named after the Russian victory at the Battle of Chesma in 1770. She was built by the Russian Steam Navigation Company (RoPIT) at Sevastopol. She was laid down in late June 1883, launched on 18 May 1886, and completed on 29 May 1889. Her crew was also considered unreliable when the crew of the Potemkin mutinied and she did not participate in the pursuit. She escorted Potemkin as Sinop towed her back to Sevastopol from Constanța, Romania, where Potemkin had sought asylum. She was turned over to the Sevastopol port authorities before being stricken on 14 August 1907. Before she was fully dismantled the Naval Ministry decided to use her hull for full-scale armor trials. She was redesignated as Stricken Vessel Nr. 4 on 22 April 1912 before being used as a gunnery target. Afterwards she served as a torpedo target for the destroyers of the Black Sea Fleet. During these attacks she settled to the bottom of Tendra Bay and was eventually scrapped during the mid-1920s.

=== Sinop ===
Sinop (Синоп) was named after the Russian victory in the Battle of Sinop in 1853. She was laid down at Sevastopol by RoPIT in late June 1883, launched on 1 June 1887, and completed in 1889 when she began her trials. She participated in the pursuit of the Potemkin and towed her back to Sevastopol from Constanța, Romania, where Potemkin had sought asylum. She was converted to a gunnery training ship in 1910 before she became a guardship at Sevastopol and had her 12-inch guns removed in exchange for four single 8-inch (203 mm) guns in turrets. She was refitted in 1916 with torpedo bulges to act as 'mine-bumpers' for a proposed operation in the heavily mined Bosphorus. Both the Bolsheviks and the Whites captured her during the Russian Civil War after her engines were destroyed by the British in 1919. She was scrapped by the Soviets beginning in 1922.

=== Georgiy Pobedonosets ===
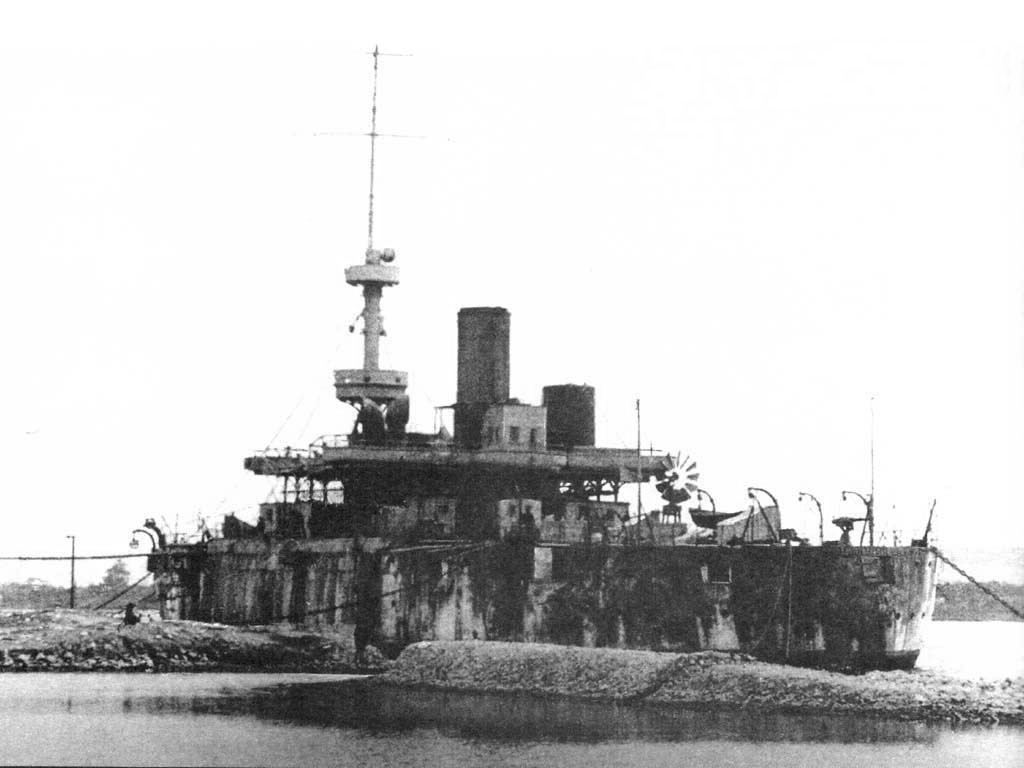
Georgii Pobedonosets interned in Bizerte late 1920s

Georgii Pobedonosets (Георгий Победоносец) was named after Saint George the Victorious. She was laid down by RoPIT on 5 May 1891, launched on 9 March 1892, and completed in 1893, although her trials lasted until mid-1895. She was only a half-sister to the others as her armor scheme was different and she was built much later than the earlier ships. She participated in the pursuit of the Potemkin, but her crew mutinied themselves. However, loyal crew members regained control of the ship the next day and they ran her aground when Potemkin threatened to fire on her if she left Odessa harbor. She was relegated to second-line duties in 1908 and had her main guns removed later. She fired three rounds at the Goeben during her bombardment of Sevastopol in 1914, the only shots fired in anger by any ship of this class, but spent most of the war serving as a headquarters ship in Sevastopol. She was captured by the Germans in 1918 and turned over by them to the British who sabotaged her engines when they abandoned the Crimea in 1919. She was captured by both sides during the Russian Civil War, but ended up being towed to Bizerte by the fleeing White Russians where she was eventually scrapped by the French Government.

== See also ==
- List of ironclads of Russia

== Bibliography ==
- McLaughlin, Stephen (2003). Russian & Soviet Battleships. Annapolis, Maryland: Naval Institute Press. ISBN 1-55750-481-4.
- Jane, F.T., ed. (1904). Jane's Fighting Ships. Sampson, Low, Marston, London.
