= Russian battleship Chesma (1886) =

Russian battleship

Coordinates: 46°18′N 31°25′E

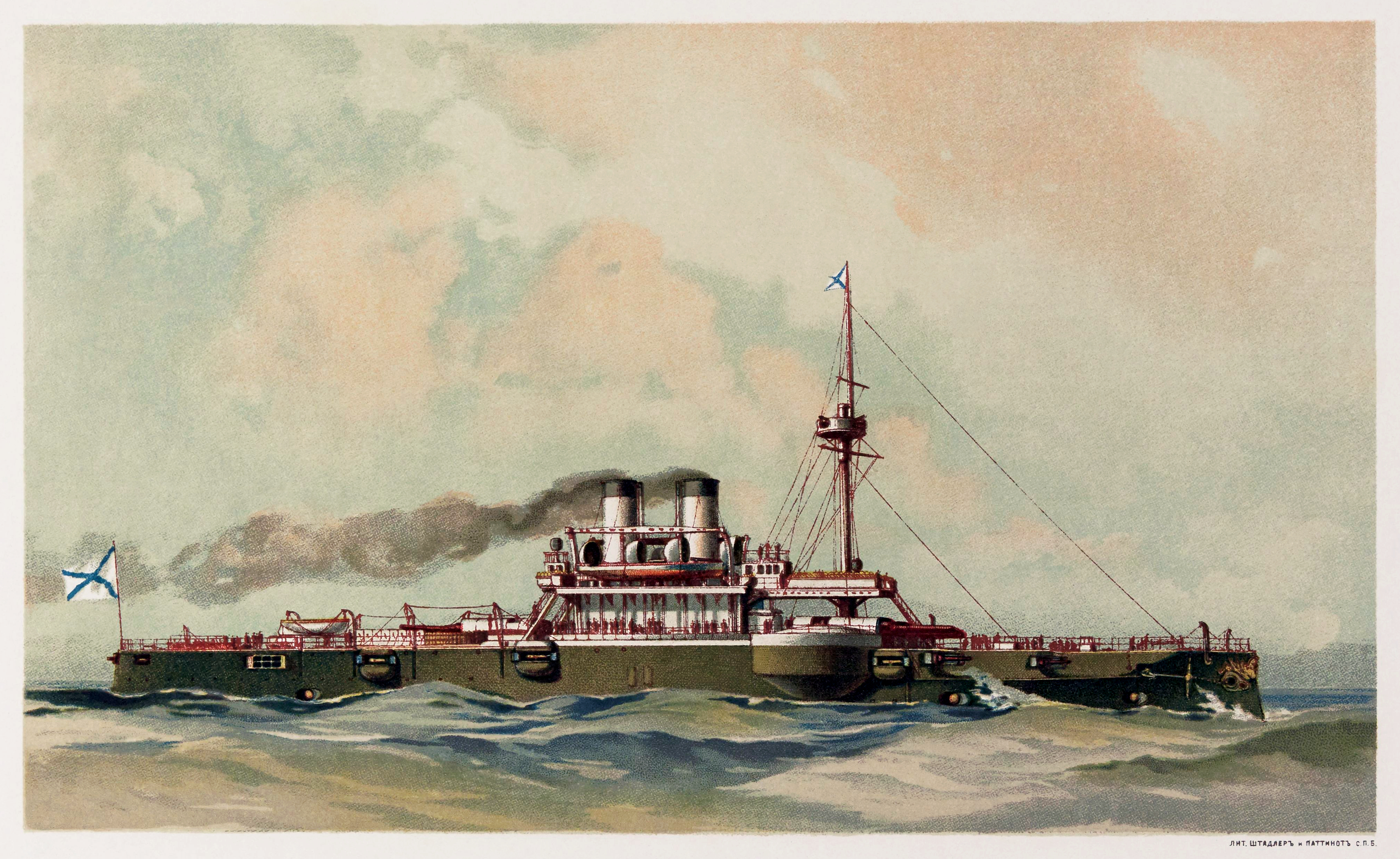
- An 1892 lithograph depicting Chesma

History

Russian Empire
- Name: Chesma
- Namesake: Battle of Chesma
- Builder: ROPiT Shipyard, Sevastopol
- Cost: 3,217,500 rubles
- Laid down: June 1883
- Launched: 18 May 1886
- In service: 29 May 1889
- Renamed: Stricken Vessel Nr. 4 22 April 1912
- Stricken: 14 August 1907
- Fate: Scrapped mid-1920s

General characteristics
- Class & type: Ekaterina II-class battleship
- Displacement: 11,396 long tons (11,579 t)
- Length: 339 ft 3 in (103.4 m)
- Beam: 68 ft 11 in (21.0 m)
- Draft: 28 ft 10 in (8.8 m)
- Installed power: 9,059 ihp (6,755 kW)
- Propulsion: 2 shafts, vertical compound steam engines; 14 cylindrical boilers
- Speed: 13.55 knots (25.09 km/h; 15.59 mph)
- Range: 2,800 nmi (5,200 km; 3,200 mi) at 10 knots (19 km/h; 12 mph)
- Complement: 633
- Armament: 3 × 2 – 12-inch (305 mm) guns; 7 × 1 – 6-inch (152 mm) guns; 8 × 1 – 47-millimeter (1.9 in) 5-barrel revolving Hotchkiss guns; 4 × 1 – 37-millimeter (1.5 in) 5-barrel revolving Hotchkiss guns; 7 × 1 – 14-inch (356 mm) torpedo tubes
- Armor: Compound armor; Belt: 8–16 in (203–406 mm); Redoubt: 12 inches; Decks: 2–2.5 in (51–64 mm); Gun shields: 2–3 in (51–76 mm); Conning tower: 8–9 in (203–229 mm)

Chesma (Russian: Чесма, also transliterated Tchésma) was the second ship of the Ekaterina II-class battleships built for the Imperial Russian Navy in the 1880s. When the ship was completed she proved to be very overweight which meant that much of her waterline armor belt was submerged. Russian companies could not produce the most advanced armour and machinery desired by the Naval General Staff, so they were imported from the United Kingdom and Belgium. Chesma spent her career as part of the Black Sea Fleet.

When the crew of the battleship Potemkin mutinied in June 1905, (Note: All dates used in this article are New Style.) the ship's crew was considered unreliable and she did not participate in the pursuit of the Potemkin. Chesma did, however, escort Potemkin as Sinop towed her back to Sevastopol from Constanța, Romania, where Potemkin had sought asylum. Chesma was turned over to the Sevastopol port authorities before being stricken on 14 August 1907. Before she was fully dismantled the Naval Ministry decided to use her hull for full-scale armour trials. She was re-designated as Stricken Vessel Nr. 4 on 22 April 1912 before being used as a gunnery target. Afterwards the ship served as a torpedo target for the destroyers of the Black Sea Fleet. During these attacks Chesma settled to the bottom of the Bay of Tendra and was eventually scrapped during the mid-1920s.

== Design and description ==
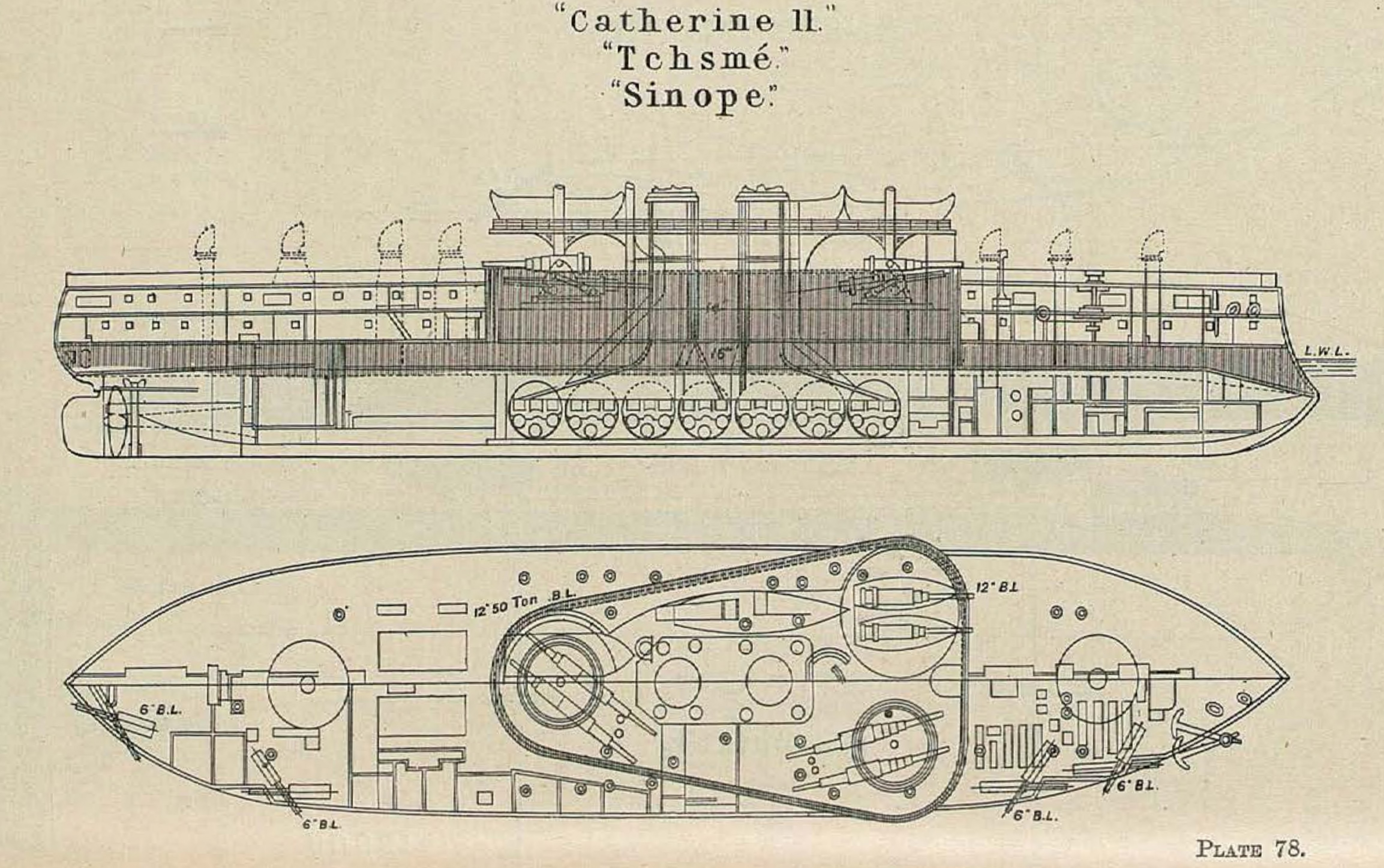
Right elevation and deck plan as depicted in Brassey's Naval Annual 1896

Chesma was 331 feet 8.5 inches (101.1 m) long at the waterline and 339 feet 3 inches (103.4 m) long overall. She had a beam of 68 feet 11 inches (21.0 m) and a draft of 28 feet 10 inches (8.8 m) more than 28 inches (710 mm) than designed. She displaced 11,396 long tons (11,579 t) at load, over 1,200 long tons (1,200 t) more than her designed displacement of 10,181 long tons (10,344 t).

Chesma had two 3-cylinder vertical compound steam engines imported from the Belgian Cockerill company. Fourteen cylindrical boilers, also imported from Cockerill, provided steam to the engines. The engines had a total designed output of 9,000 indicated horsepower (6,700 kW), but they produced 9,059 ihp (6,755 kW) on trials and gave a top speed of almost 16 knots (30 km/h; 18 mph). At full load she carried 900 long tons (910 t) of coal that provided her a range of 2,800 nautical miles (5,200 km; 3,200 mi) at a speed of 10 knots (19 km/h; 12 mph) and 1,367 nautical miles (2,532 km; 1,573 mi) at 14.5 knots (26.9 km/h; 16.7 mph).

She differed from her sister ships mainly in her main armament. She had six 12 in (305 mm) Model 1886 35-caliber guns mounted in twin barbette mounts, two forward, side by side, and one aft. Each of the forward mounts could traverse 30° across the bow and 35° abaft the beam, or a total of 155°. The rear mount could traverse 202°. They had a range of elevation from −2° to +15°. Chesma's guns were mounted on unbalanced turntables and they caused her to list when the guns were trained to one side. Traversing all the guns as far as they could go to one side produced a list of 7.6° and made it very difficult for the turntable machinery to rotate the guns back to the fore-and-aft position. This problem had been anticipated and water tanks had been added to counteract the list, but they proved to be virtually useless because they took up to two hours to fill. The problem was partially cured in 1892 when the equipment was rearranged on the turntable to improve their balance, but more thorough solutions to the problem were either deemed too expensive or inadequate. Their rate of fire was reportedly one round every fifteen to seventeen minutes, including training time. Sixty rounds per gun were carried. The main guns were mounted very low, (only 4 feet 6 inches (1.37 m)) above the main deck, and caused extensive damage to the deck when fired over the bow or stern. They fired a 'light' shell that weighed 731.3 lb (331.7 kg) or a 'heavy' shell that weighed 1,003 lb (455 kg). The 'light' shell had a muzzle velocity of 2,090 ft/s (640 m/s) while the 'heavy' shell could only be propelled at a velocity of 2,000 ft/s (610 m/s). The 'light' shell had a maximum range of 11,600 yards (10,600 m) when fired at an elevation of 15°.

The seven 6-inch (152 mm) 35-caliber guns were mounted on broadside pivot mounts in hull embrasures, except for one gun mounted in the stern in the hull. The eight 47-millimeter (1.9 in) five-barreled revolving Hotchkiss guns were mounted in small embrasures in the hull to defend the ship against torpedo boats. Four 37-millimeter (1.5 in) five-barreled revolving Hotchkiss guns were mounted in the fighting top. She carried seven above-water 14-inch (356 mm) torpedo tubes, one tube forward on each side, able to bear on forward targets, two other tubes were mounted on each broadside forward and aft of the central citadel; the seventh tube was in the stern.

== History ==
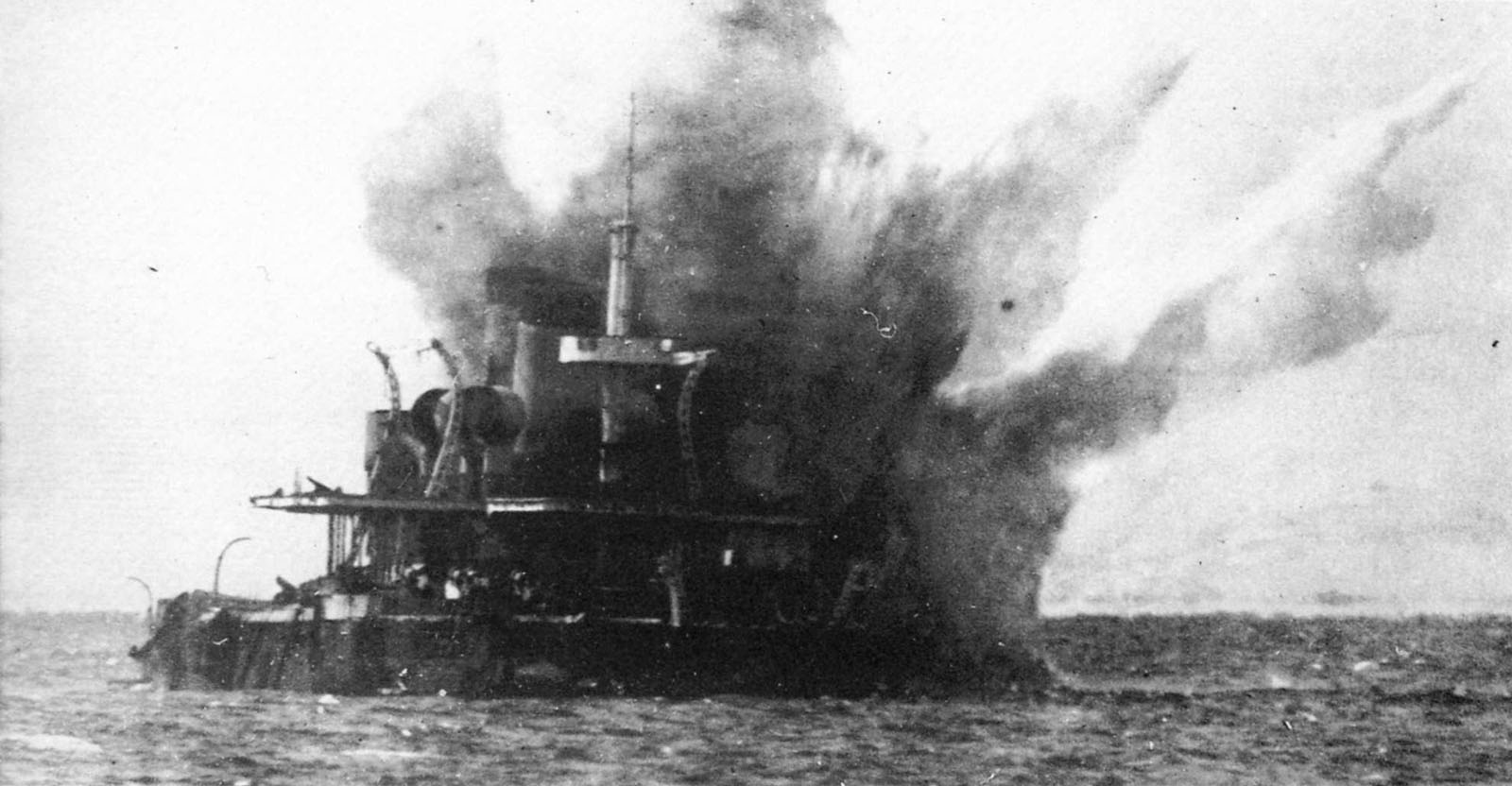
Chesma being used as a target ship in 1912

Chesma was named after the Russian victory at the Battle of Chesma in 1770. She was built by the Russian Steam Navigation Company (RoPIT) at Sevastopol. She was laid down in late June 1883, launched on 18 May 1886, and completed on 29 May 1889. She served with the Black Sea Fleet until 1907. She was inactive in 1895, probably for mechanical problems. Chesma conducted trials in 1902 with towing spherical observation balloons and she was re-boilered the following year. Plans were made for a radical reconstruction to be done while her boilers were being replaced. The rebuilding involved cutting her down by one deck and replacing her armament with two twin-gun turrets equipped with 12-inch 40-caliber guns and ten 6-inch 45-caliber guns between the turrets in an armoured citadel that used Krupp armor. This proved to be too expensive and it was cancelled, but not before the armor and turrets had been ordered. Her turrets were used to equip the pre-dreadnought Ioann Zlatoust, then under construction.

When the crew of the battleship Potemkin mutinied in June 1905, Chesma's crew was considered unreliable, and she did not participate in the pursuit of Potemkin. She escorted Potemkin as Sinop towed her back to Sevastopol from Constanța, Romania, where Potemkin had sought asylum.

The ship was turned over to the Sevastopol port authorities before being stricken on 14 August 1907. Before she was fully dismantled the Naval Ministry decided to use her hull for full-scale armour trials. She was re-designated as Stricken Vessel Nr. 4 on 22 April 1912. Chesma was fitted with a replica of the armour system used in the Gangut-class battleships to test its effectiveness. She was towed into position and given a 7° list to simulate the descent angle of shells fired at long range. Ironically her own guns were used against her as Ioann Zlatoust anchored 750 meters (2,460 ft) away and fired 12-inch, 8-inch (203 mm) and 6-inch shells with reduced charges to simulate shells fired from approximately 16,000–18,000 yards (15,000–16,000 m) away. These revealed significant weaknesses in the support structure for the armour plates and in the deck protection, but the Gangut-class ships were too far along in construction to incorporate fixes. Afterwards she served as a torpedo target for the destroyers of the Black Sea Fleet. During these attacks she settled to the bottom of the Bay of Tendra and was eventually scrapped during the mid-1920s.

== Bibliography ==
- McLaughlin, Stephen (2003). Russian & Soviet Battleships. Annapolis, Maryland: Naval Institute Press. ISBN 1-55750-481-4.
