= 6 inch 35 caliber naval gun 1877 =

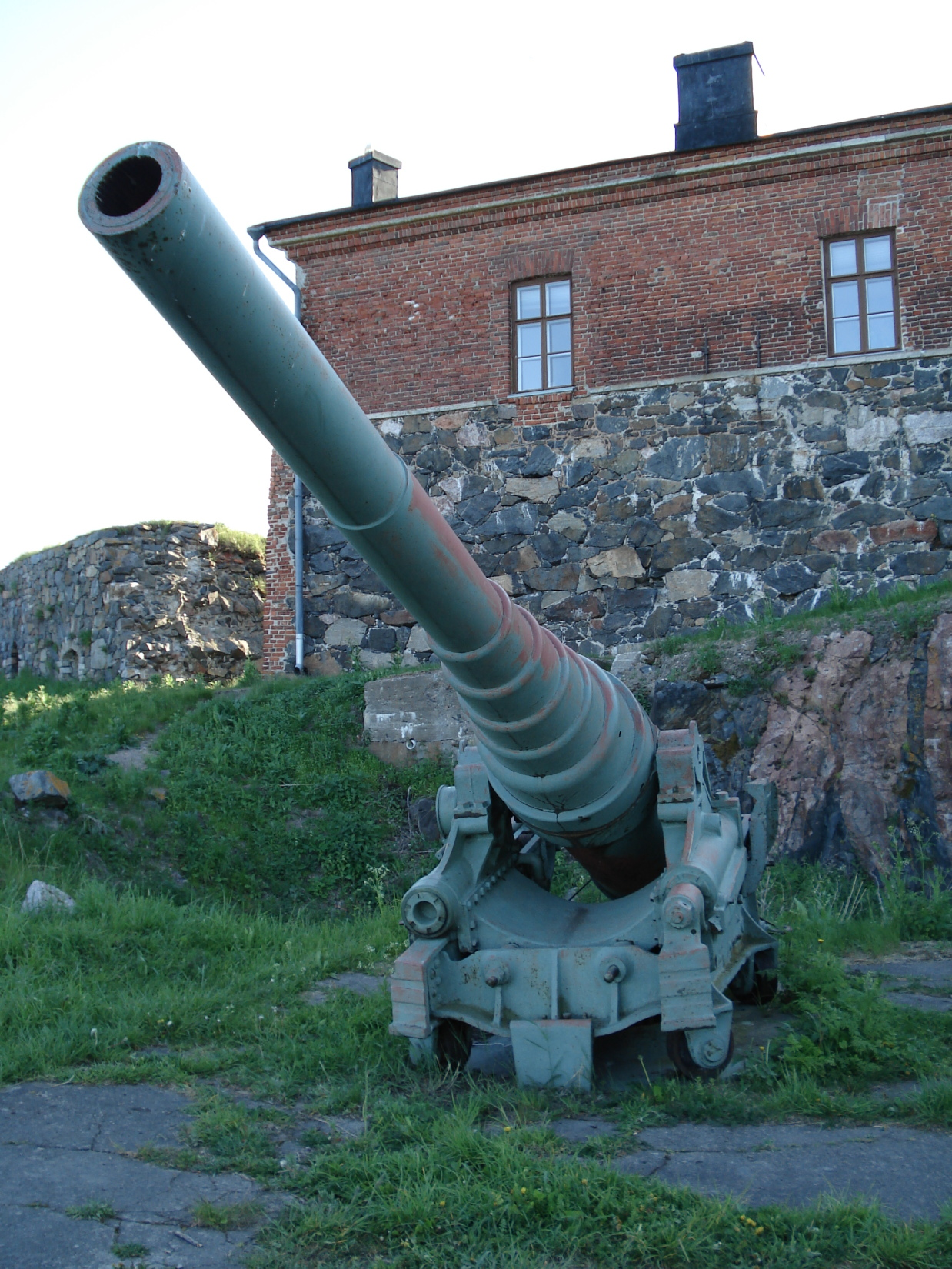
- Russian 6 inch 35 caliber naval gun in Suomenlinna
- Type: Naval and coastal gun
- Place of origin: Russian Empire

Service history
- In service: 1885–1917 Russian Empire; 1917–1944 Finland
- Used by: Russian Empire; Finland
- Wars: Russo-Japanese War; First World War; Second World War

Production history
- Designer: A. F. Brink
- Designed: 1882
- Manufacturer: Obukhov State Plant
- Variants: Hoop gun 1885; Wire-wound barrel 1887; New wire-wound barrel 1892

Specifications
- Mass: 8,500 kg (18,700 lb)
- Barrel length: 5,349 mm (17 ft 7 in)
- Caliber: 152.4 mm (6 in)
- Breech: Interrupted screw
- Carriage: Vavasseur mount Dubrov mount Krel casemate mount
- Elevation: Vavasseur mount: -7° to +20° Dubrov mount: -5° to +15° Krel mount: -4° to +12°
- Traverse: Vavasseur mount: 360°
- Rate of fire: Theoretical: 4-5 rpm Practical: 1 rpm
- Muzzle velocity: 600–700 m/s (2,000–2,300 ft/s) depending on ammunition
- Maximum firing range: 15,000 m (16,000 yd)

The 6 inch 35 caliber naval gun 1877 was a 152 mm naval gun used by the Russian Empire. The gun was used from 1887 as battleship secondary armament and cruiser armament. The gun was mostly replaced by newer 6 inch 45 caliber Canet gun 1892 at the time of the Russo-Japanese War, but was still used on some ships. During the First World War fourteen guns were used as coastal guns on Gulf of Finland in the Peter the Great's Naval Fortress and were taken over by Finland after Finland's Declaration of Independence in 1917. The guns were used by Finland in the Second World War. Russian model year 1877 refers to rifling system, not gun adoption.

== Background ==
Russian Empire Staff captain A.F. Brink had developed plans for a new six inch 35 caliber gun that was able to withstand 20% higher barrel pressures than existing guns. In 1882 development began for a new six inch naval gun that resulted in Brink's design being selected. Based on gun barrel material strength theories of lieutenant general N.V. Kalakutskij Obukhov State Plant produced the first 35 caliber gun in 1885. The design was a hoop gun with a total of eight layers besides the inner barrel: five mantle barrels, shroud, connecting and mounting rings. The gun was the first medium caliber gun used by Russia that had Treuille de Beaulieu screw breech block with de Bange obturator.

== Modifications and mountings ==
While the first guns were being constructed, technology for making wire-wound guns was purchased from the United Kingdom in 1885. After the first batch of guns was completed in 1887 production was changed to wire-wound model. At the beginning of the 1890s a simplified wire-wound version was developed in Russia and was used in the production of the remaining orders. The adoption of 6 inch 45 caliber Canet gun halted the production of the older 6 inch 35 caliber gun.

Putilov factory developed Vavasseur mounting for the gun in 1886 that had the central pivot at the centre of the mount and a circular base plate allowing 360° traverse. This mounting was used on deck gun installations. In 1887 Vavasseur-Dubrov or simply Dubrov mount was developed. For casemate guns a Krel mounting was developed in 1886 that had the central pivot at the front of the mount with the rear of the mounting traversing on steel rollers.

== Service ==
The 6 inch 35 caliber gun formed the standard secondary battery of Imperial Russian Navy pre-dreadnought battleships from mid-1880s to mid-1890s and was used on Ekaterina II and Imperator Aleksandr II-class battleships along with Gangut, Dvenadsat Apostolov and Navarin battleships. It was also used on Admiral Nakhimov and Pamiat Azova armored cruisers and on Admiral Kornilov protected cruiser. The gun was used to refit old Pervenets-class ironclads and also on gunboats. During the Russo-Japanese War most of these ships had been fitted with the newer 6 inch 45 caliber Canet guns. During the First World War fourteen guns were used as coastal guns on Gulf of Finland in Peter the Great's Naval Fortress and were taken over by Finland after Finland's Declaration of Independence in 1917.

== Service in Finland ==
Following Finland's independence the fourteen 6 inch 35 caliber guns on Vavasseur mountings in the coastal forts of Gulf of Vyborg and Koivisto area were taken over by Finland. Six guns were in Härkölä and four guns both in Tuppura and Humaljoki. The Finnish designation for the gun was 152/35 Mk or 152 mm:n 35 kaliiperin merikanuuna (152 mm 35 caliber coastal gun). The "Mk" designation means simply coastal gun (merikanuuna); unlike other coastal guns in Finnish use this gun did not receive a manufacturer marking. The batteries in Härkölä and Tuppura were dismantled prior to Winter War and the guns moved first to Lake Ladoga and later to Archipelago Sea: two guns in Lypertö, three in Bokulla, three in Lökholm and one in Pensar. Humaljoki battery supported Finnish troops in Winter War by shelling Soviet positions including troops attempting to cross over frozen sea. When Soviet forces breached the Mannerheim Line in February 1940 the battery crew fired off their remaining ammunition and destroyed the guns on the night between 19th and 20 February 1940 when the fort was abandoned.

During Continuation War the gun was used on Archipelago Sea and during the trench warfare period also on Lake Ladoga at Saunaniemi. At the end of Continuation War there were seven guns remaining, two at Lypertö, three at Bokulla and two at Ristisaari. Additionally three spare barrels were stored in Helsinki Naval Base. After the war one gun was placed on display at Suomenlinna and the rest were scrapped.

== Bibliography ==
- Friedman, Norman (2011). Naval Weapons of World War One. Barnsley, South Yorkshire, UK: Seaforth. ISBN 978-1-84832-100-7.
