= Compound armour =

Type of armour used on warships

Compound armour was a type of armour used on warships in the 1880s, developed in response to the emergence of armor-piercing shells and the continual need for reliable protection with the increasing size in naval ordnance. Compound armour was a non-alloyed attempt to combine the benefits of two different metals—the hardness of steel with the toughness of iron—that would stand up to intense and repeated punishment in battle. By the end of the decade it had been rendered obsolete by nickel-steel armour. However, the general principle of compound iron was used for case-hardened armour, which replaced nickel-steel in the mid-1890s and is still used today.

== Prior armours ==
Prior to the 1880s, all naval armour plating was made from uniform homogeneous wrought iron plates on top of several inches of teak to absorb the shock of projectile impact. A typical installation consisted of several inches of equal measures of iron and wood (typically teak), with a combined thickness of up to 4ft in the most extreme cases.

Various experiments were carried out in order to improve the armour, which included breaking up the armour into a laminate of several thinner layers of iron with wood between them, as well as various experiments with cast vs. wrought iron. In all of these experiments, simple blocks of wrought iron consistently proved to provide the best protection.

There had been several attempts to improve on iron with the addition of harder steels on the face, but these all failed for the same reason as the earlier laminate experiments; the ability for the armour to spread sideways into its softer backing allowed it to be penetrated more easily. In the case of steel facing, the problem was that the steel would not adhere well to the underlying iron, allowing it to shift or separate entirely.

The first compound armour were designed by the Austrian engineer Friedrich Thiele. The monitor ships SMS Leitha and the SMS Maros were equipped with these armours.

In 1876 a competition was held by the Italian Navy at Spezia to trial new armours. By that point conventional iron armours had to be 22 inches (560 mm) thick to stop contemporary naval artillery. The decisive winner was a new soft steel from the French firm of Schneider et Cie, but this proved to be prone to breakage when stressed, making it less useful in naval applications.

== Compound armour ==
Compound armour was made from two different types of steel; a very hard but brittle high-carbon steel front plate backed by a more elastic low-carbon wrought iron plate. The front plate was intended to break up an incoming shell, whilst the rear plate would catch any splinters and hold the armour together if the brittle front plate shattered.

Steel plates positioned in front of iron plates had been tried unsuccessfully, for example in a trial by the Italian Navy at Spezia in 1876. The problem of welding them together was solved independently by two engineers, Alexander Wilson of Cammell & Co. and J. D. Ellis of John Brown & Company. Wilson's technique, invented in 1877, was to pour molten steel onto a wrought iron plate, whilst Ellis' was to position the two plates close together and pour molten steel into the gap. In both cases, the plate formed was rolled down to about half of the original thickness. The steel front surface formed about one-third of the thickness of the plate.

Compound armour was initially much better than either iron or steel plates, about a 25% improvement. Throughout the decade continuous improvements were made in techniques for manufacturing both compound armour and steel armour. Nevertheless by the end of the decade all-steel plates had decisively edged ahead of compound armour, and the latter had become obsolete. Two major reasons for this were the introduction of forged chrome-steel shot in 1886 and the discovery of nickel-steel alloys in 1889 which proved particularly effective as armour plate.

For instance, a trial by the French Navy at Gâvres in 1880 found compound armour superior to all-steel plates. An 1884 trial in Copenhagen found that there was little difference between the two types, although compound armour was subsequently ordered by the Danish Navy, probably because it was cheaper. At the same time a similar trial to select the armour of the Italian ironclad Lepanto saw 20-inch-thick (510 mm) compound armour plate demolished by two shots of the 10-inch calibre guns which were to be fitted to the ship, whilst the same projectiles were shattered by 20 inches of French Creusot steel plate.

== Sources ==
- Armor and Ships: Journal of the United States Artillery (Fort Monroe, Virginia: Coast Artillery School Press, 1910), Issue 80, July-August 1906. At Google Books. Accessed 13 April 2012.
- Brown, David K. (2003). Warrior to Dreadnought, warship development 1860-1905. Caxton Publishing Group. ISBN 1-84067-529-2.
- Gene Slover's US Navy Pages - Naval Ordnance and Gunnery, Chapter XII, Armor
