= Russian battleship Evstafi =

Imperial Russian Navy's Evstafi-class battleship

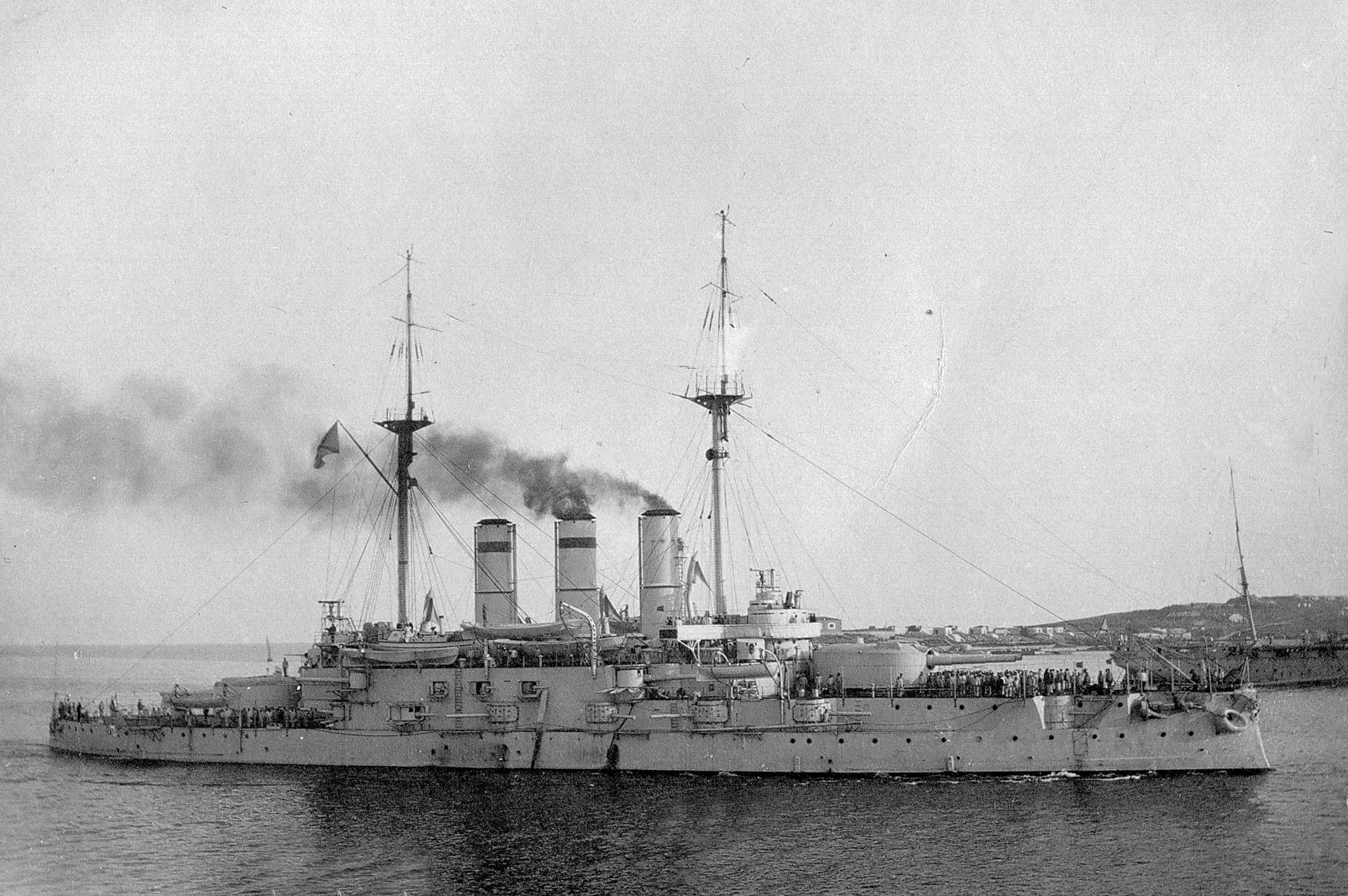
- Evstafi in Sevastopol Bay, 1910s

History

Russian Empire
- Name: Evstafi
- Namesake: Saint Eustace
- Builder: Nikolayev Admiralty Shipyard, Nikolayev
- Laid down: 13 November 1904
- Launched: 3 November 1906
- In service: 28 May 1911
- Out of service: March 1918
- Renamed: Revoliutsiia (Revolution), 6 July 1921
- Stricken: 21 November 1925
- Fate: Scrapped, 1922

General characteristics
- Class & type: Evstafi-class pre-dreadnought battleship
- Displacement: 12,738 long tons (12,942 t)
- Length: 385 ft 9 in (117.6 m)
- Beam: 74 ft (22.6 m)
- Draught: 28 ft (8.5 m)
- Installed power: 22 Belleville boilers; 10,600 ihp (7,904 kW)
- Propulsion: 2 shafts, 2 triple-expansion steam engines
- Speed: 16 knots (30 km/h; 18 mph)
- Range: 2,100 nmi (3,900 km; 2,400 mi) at 10 knots (19 km/h; 12 mph)
- Complement: 928
- Armament: 2 × twin 12 in (305 mm) guns; 4 × single 8 in (203 mm) guns; 12 × single 6 in (152 mm) guns; 14 × single 75 mm (3.0 in) guns; 2 × single 17.7 in (450 mm) torpedo tubes
- Armour: Krupp armour; Belt: 7–9 in (178–229 mm); Deck: 1.37–2.75 in (35–70 mm); Turrets: 10 in (254 mm); Barbettes: 10 in (254 mm); Conning tower: 8 in (203 mm); Bulkheads: 7 in (178 mm)

Evstafi (Russian: Евстафий) was the lead ship of her class of two pre-dreadnought battleship of the Imperial Russian Navy's Black Sea Fleet. She was built before World War I and her completion was greatly delayed by changes made to reflect the lessons of the Russo-Japanese War of 1905.

She and her sister ship Ioann Zlatoust were the most modern ships in the Black Sea Fleet when World War I began and formed the core of the fleet for the first year of the war, before the dreadnoughts entered service. They forced the German battlecruiser SMS Goeben to disengage during the Battle of Cape Sarych shortly after Russia declared war on the Ottoman Empire in late 1914. She covered several bombardments of the Bosphorus fortifications in early 1915, including one where she was attacked by Goeben, but Evstafi, together with the other Russian pre-dreadnoughts, managed to drive her off. Evstafi was relegated to secondary roles after the first dreadnought entered service in late 1915 and reduced to reserve in 1918 in Sevastopol.

Evstafi was captured when the Germans took the city in May 1918 and was turned over to the Allies after the Armistice in November 1918. Her engines were destroyed in 1919 by the British when they withdrew from Sevastopol to prevent the advancing Bolsheviks from using them against the White Russians. She was abandoned when the Whites evacuated the Crimea in 1920 and was scrapped by the Soviets in 1922–23.

== Description ==
Evstafi was 379 feet (115.5 m) long at the waterline and 385 feet 9 inches (117.6 m) long overall. She had a beam of 74 feet (22.6 m) and a maximum draft of 28 ft (8.5 m). Her displacement was 12,738 long tons (12,942 t) as designed.

She had two 3-cylinder vertical triple expansion steam engines driving two propellers. 22 Belleville water-tube boilers provided steam to the engines. The engines had a total designed output of 10,600 indicated horsepower (7,904 kW) and gave a top speed of 16 knots (30 km/h; 18 mph). At full load she carried 1,100 long tons (1,118 t) of coal that provided her a range of 2,100 nautical miles (3,900 km; 2,400 mi) at a speed of 10 knots (19 km/h; 12 mph).

Evstafi's Obukhovskii 12-inch Pattern 1895 40-calibre guns were mounted in two twin-gun turrets, one each fore and aft. Each turret had a firing arc of 260°. All four 8-inch (203 mm) 50-calibre Pattern 1905 guns were mounted in the corners of the superstructure in armoured casemates. These guns had a firing arc of 120° and could fire straight ahead or astern. The dozen 6-inch (152 mm) Canet Pattern 1892 45-calibre guns were mounted in the lower casemates. The anti-torpedo boat armament consisted of 14 75-millimetre (3.0 in) Canet Pattern 1892 50-calibre guns mounted in sponsons on the upper deck, protected by gun shields. She carried two 17.7-inch (450 mm) torpedo tubes on the broadside aft.

=== Wartime modifications ===
Evstafi was fitted with anti-aircraft guns on top of each of her turrets during 1915 and screens were added on top of her funnels to keep out light bombs. She first received three 75 mm guns, but these were later replaced by two 63.5-millimetre (2.5 in) guns and a pair of 40-millimetre (1.6 in) guns.

== Service history ==
Construction of Evstafi began on 13 July 1904, (Note: All dates used in this article are New Style) well before the formal keel-laying ceremony on 23 November 1904. Progress was relatively quick, despite the disruptions caused by the 1905 Revolution, and she was launched on 3 November 1906. Fitting-out, however, was considerably delayed by a number of changes made as the navy digested the lessons of the Russo-Japanese War and she was not completed until 28 May 1911. Shortly after completion she ran aground off the Romanian port of Constanţa in October 1911, but was only slightly damaged.

=== World War I ===
Evstafi, as the newest ship in the Black Sea Fleet, was the flagship of Vice Admiral Andrei Eberhardt, commanding the fleet, for the first year or so of World War I. Two weeks after the Russian declaration of war on the Ottoman Empire on 2 November 1914, the Black Sea Fleet, comprising the pre-dreadnoughts Evstafi, Ioann Zlatoust, Pantelimon, Rostislav, Tri Sviatitelia, and three cruisers were escorted by three destroyers and 11 torpedo boats set out on 15 November to bombard Trebizond. They did this successfully on the morning of 17 November and they turned west to hunt for Turkish shipping along the Anatolian coast before setting course for Sevastopol later that afternoon. They were intercepted by the Turkish battlecruiser Yavuz Sultan Selim and the light cruiser Midilli the following day in what came to be known as the Battle of Cape Sarych. Despite the noon hour the conditions were foggy and the capital ships initially did not spot each other. The Black Sea Fleet had experimented on concentrating fire from several ships under the control of a "master ship" before the war and Evstafi held her fire until Ioann Zlatoust, the master ship, could see Yavuz. When the gunnery commands were finally received they showed a range over 4,000 yards (3,700 m) in excess of Evstafi's own estimate of 7,700 yards (7,000 m), so Evstafi opened fire using her own data before Yavuz turned to unmask its broadside. She scored a hit with her first salvo as a 12-inch shell partially penetrated the armor casemate protecting one of Yavuz's 15-centimetre (5.9 in) secondary guns. It detonated some of the ready-use ammunition, starting a fire that burnt out the casemate and killed its crew.

Yavuz returned fire shortly afterwards and hit Evstafi in the middle funnel; the shell detonated after it passed through the funnel and destroyed the antenna for the fire-control radio, which meant that Evstafi could not correct Ioann Zlatoust's inaccurate range data. Yavuz hit Evstafi four more times. although one shell failed to detonate, before Rear Admiral Wilhelm Souchon decided to turn away and break contact after fourteen minutes of combat. Evstafi suffered 34 killed and 24 wounded from those hits. Evstafi only fired between 12 and 16 12-inch shells as well as 14 eight-inch and 19 six-inch shells.

Several armour plates on Evstafi required replacement after the battle and they were taken from the old pre-dreadnought Dvenadsat Apostolov so that the repairs were completed by 29 November. On 9 January 1915 Midilli and the Hamidiye encountered the Russian fleet while returning from a mission in the eastern part of the Black Sea. Midilli hit Evstafi's forward turret with a 10.5-centimetre (4.1 in) shell, temporarily putting it out of action, and the two cruisers escaped using their superior speed.

Evstafi and Ioann Zlatoust served as the covering force for several bombardment missions of the Bosphorus between 18 March and 9 May 1915. The two earlier bombardments were uneventful, but the 9 May bombardment provoked a reaction as Yavuz intercepted the Russian battleships after they'd been spotted by the Nümune-i Hamiyet. Both forces turned on parallel courses and opened fire at the range of 17,400 yards (15,900 m). Neither side scored a hit although Yavuz had multiple near-misses on Evstafi. Admiral Eberhardt ordered his ships to make only 5 knots (9.3 km/h; 5.8 mph) while Yavuz was making 25 knots (46 km/h; 29 mph). Yavuz was unable to cross the T of the Russian ships, despite its superior speed, as they were continually turning. This manoeuvre bought enough time that Tri Sviatitelia and Pantelimon were able to rejoin the other two ships before they could start shelling the Ottoman forts. Pantelimon hit Yavuz twice before the German ship broke contact after 22 minutes of firing. With the fleet assembled Admiral Eberhardt attempted to pursue the enemy battlecruiser, but was unsuccessful.

On 1 August 1915 she, and all the other pre-dreadnoughts, were transferred to the 2nd Battleship Brigade, after the dreadnought Imperatritsa Mariya had entered service. On 1 October the new dreadnought provided cover while Ioann Zlatoust and Pantelimon bombarded Zonguldak and Evstafi shelled the nearby town of Kozlu. Both Evstafi-class ships participated in the second bombardment of Varna in May 1916.

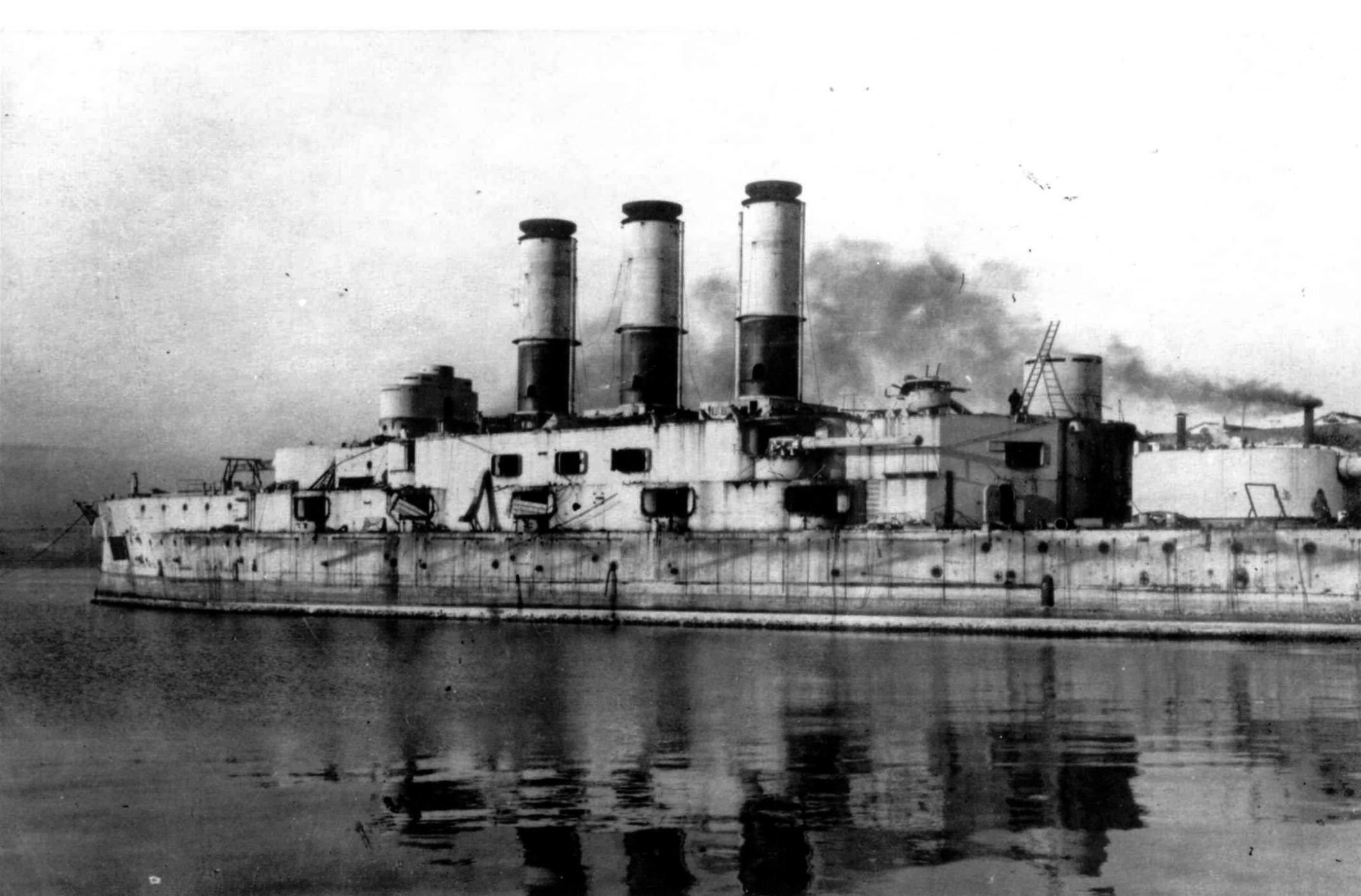
Revoliutsiia being scrapped, 1922

Evstafi and Ioann Zlatoust were reduced to reserve in March 1918 in Sevastopol. Immobile, they were captured there by the Germans in May 1918 and Evstafi was subsequently used by them as an accommodation hulk. Both ships were handed over to the Allies the following December. The British wrecked both ships' engines on 22–24 April 1919 when they left the Crimea to prevent the advancing Bolsheviks from using them against the White Russians. They were captured by both sides during the Russian Civil War, but were abandoned by the White Russians when they evacuated the Crimea in November 1920. Evstafi was renamed Revoliutsiia (Revolution) on 6 July 1921. The ships were scrapped in 1922–23, although they were not removed from the Navy List until 21 November 1925.

== Bibliography ==
- Campbell, N. J. M. (1979). "Russia". In Chesneau, Roger & Kolesnik, Eugene M. (eds.). Conway's All the World's Fighting Ships 1860–1905. New York: Mayflower Books. pp. 170–217. ISBN 0-8317-0302-4.
- McLaughlin, Stephen (2001). "Predreadnoughts vs a Dreadnought: The Action off Cape Sarych, 18 November 1914". In Preston, Antony (ed.). Warship 2001–2002. London: Conway Maritime Press. pp. 117–140. ISBN 0-85177-901-8.
- McLaughlin, Stephen (2003). Russian & Soviet Battleships. Annapolis, Maryland: Naval Institute Press. ISBN 1-55750-481-4.
- Nekrasov, George (1992). North of Gallipoli: The Black Sea Fleet at War 1914–1917. East European Monographs. Vol. CCCXLIII. Boulder, Colorado: East European Monographs. ISBN 0-88033-240-9.
