= Russian battleship Imperator Pavel I =

Russian Andrei Pervozvanny-class battleship

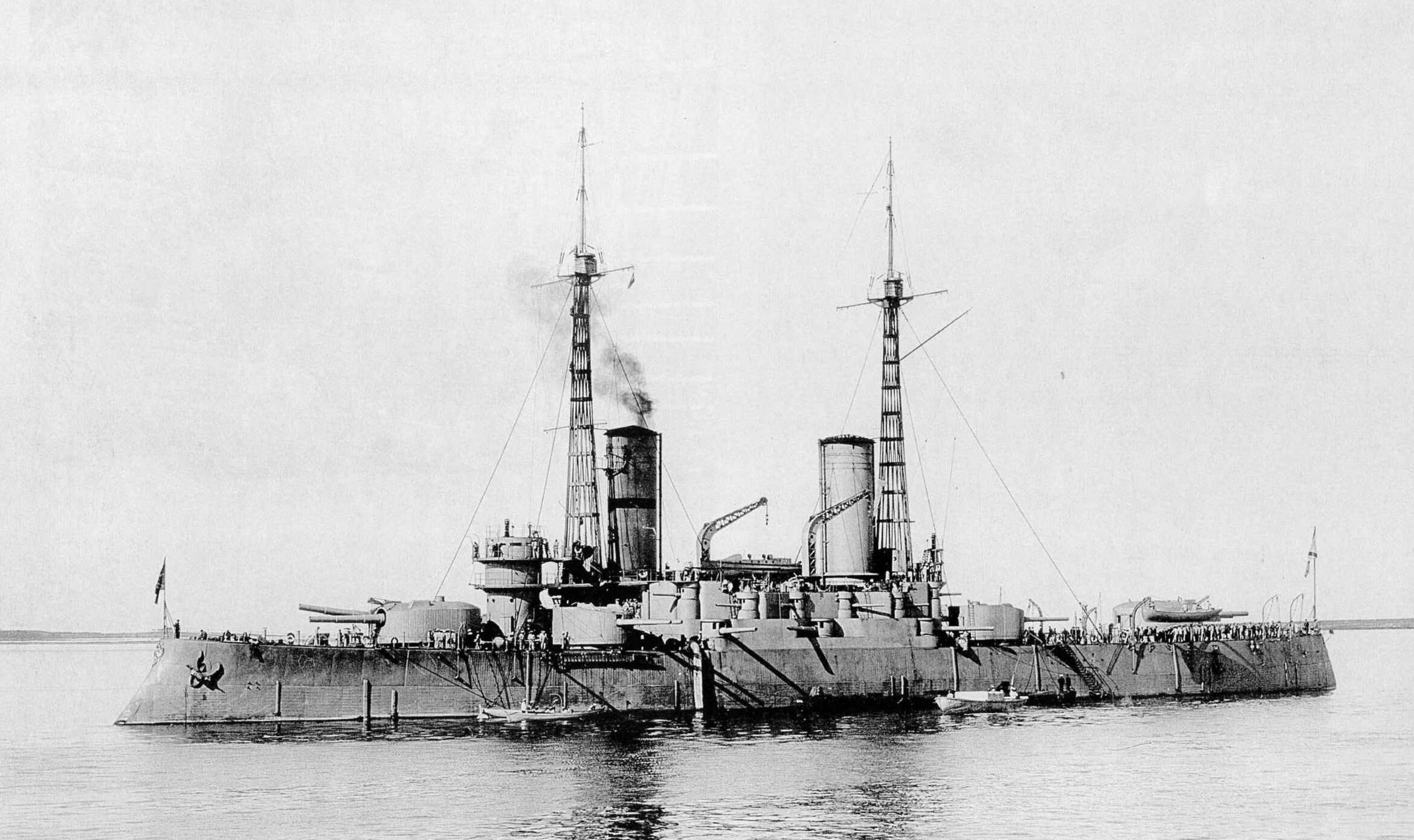
- Imperator Pavel I in 1912

History

Russian Empire
- Name: Imperator Pavel I
- Namesake: Tsar Paul I of Russia
- Builder: Baltic Shipyard, Saint Petersburg, Russia
- Laid down: 27 October 1905
- Launched: 7 September 1907
- In service: 10 March 1911
- Renamed: Respublika (Republic), 1917

Soviet Union
- Acquired: November 1917
- Out of service: September 1918
- Stricken: 21 November 1925
- Fate: Scrapped, after 22 November 1923

General characteristics as built
- Class & type: Andrei Pervozvanny-class predreadnought battleship
- Displacement: 17,320 long tons (17,600 t); 18,580 long tons (18,880 t) (deep load)
- Length: 460 ft (140.2 m) (o/a)
- Beam: 80 ft (24.4 m)
- Draft: 27 ft (8.2 m)
- Installed power: 25 × Belleville boilers; 17,600 ihp (13,100 kW)
- Propulsion: 2 shafts; 2 triple-expansion steam engines
- Speed: 18.5 knots (34.3 km/h; 21.3 mph)
- Range: 2,100 nmi (3,900 km; 2,400 mi) at 12 knots (22 km/h; 14 mph)
- Complement: 956
- Armament: 2 × twin 12 in (305 mm) guns; 4 × twin, 6 × single 8 in (203 mm) guns; 12 × single 120 mm (4.7 in) guns; 4 × single 47 mm (1.9 in) guns; 2 × 457 mm (18 in) torpedo tubes
- Armor: Belt: 4–8.5 in (102–216 mm); Upper belt: 3.1–5 in (79–127 mm); Casemates: 3.1–5 in (79–127 mm); Conning tower: 4–8 in (102–203 mm); Main gun turrets: 8–10 in (203–54 mm); Main gun barbettes: 4–5 in (102–27 mm); Secondary gun turrets: 5–6 in (127–52 mm)

Imperator Pavel I (Russian: Император Павел I - Tsar Paul I) was one of two Andrei Pervozvanny-class predreadnought battleships built for the Imperial Russian Navy in the first decade of the 20th century. The ship's construction was greatly delayed by design changes as a result of the Russo-Japanese War and labor unrest after the 1905 Revolution, and she took nearly six years to build. Imperator Pavel I was not very active during World War I and her bored sailors were the first to mutiny in early 1917. The ship was laid up in 1918 and she was scrapped in 1923.

== Description ==
Imperator Pavel I was 454 feet (138.4 m) long at the waterline and 460 feet (140.2 m) long overall. She had a beam of 80 feet (24.4 m) and a draft of 27 feet (8.2 m). The ship displaced 18,580 long tons (18,880 t) at deep load. The battleship had a double bottom and a metacentric height of 4 feet (1.2 m). The ship's crew consisted of 31 officers and 924 crewmen.

Imperator Pavel I was equipped with two 4-cylinder vertical triple-expansion steam engines with a total designed output of 17,600 indicated horsepower (13,100 kW). Twenty-five Belleville boilers provided steam to the engines. During her sea trials on 1 November 1910, they produced 18,326 ihp (13,666 kW) and a top speed of 18.5 knots (34.3 km/h; 21.3 mph). She carried a normal load of 800 long tons (810 t) of coal that provided a range of 1,300 nautical miles (2,400 km; 1,500 mi) at a speed of 12 knots (22 km/h; 14 mph) and a maximum load of 1,500 long tons (1,500 t) that gave 2,400 nautical miles (4,400 km; 2,800 mi) at the same speed.

The main armament of the Andrei Pervozvanny class consisted of two pairs of 12-inch (305 mm) Model 1895 guns mounted in twin-gun turrets fore and aft of the superstructure. Eight of the fourteen 8-inch (203 mm) Model 1905 guns were mounted in four twin-gun turret at the corners of the superstructure while six were mounted in casemates in the superstructure. For defense against torpedo boats, the ships carried twelve 120-millimeter (4.7 in) guns mounted in casemates above the 8-inch guns in the superstructure. Two underwater 450-millimeter (17.7 in) torpedo tubes were mounted, one on each broadside, and they were provided with six spare torpedoes.

Based on the Russian experience at the Battle of Tsushima, the sides of the ship's hull were completely protected by Krupp cemented armor. The main waterline belt had a maximum thickness of 8.5 inches (216 mm) and the upper belt was 5 inches (127 mm) at its thickest. The sides of the main gun turrets were 8 inches (203 mm) thick and the armor of the casemates ranged from 3.1 to 5 inches (79 to 127 mm) in thickness. The greatest thickness of deck armor was 1.5 inches (38 mm).

== Service history ==
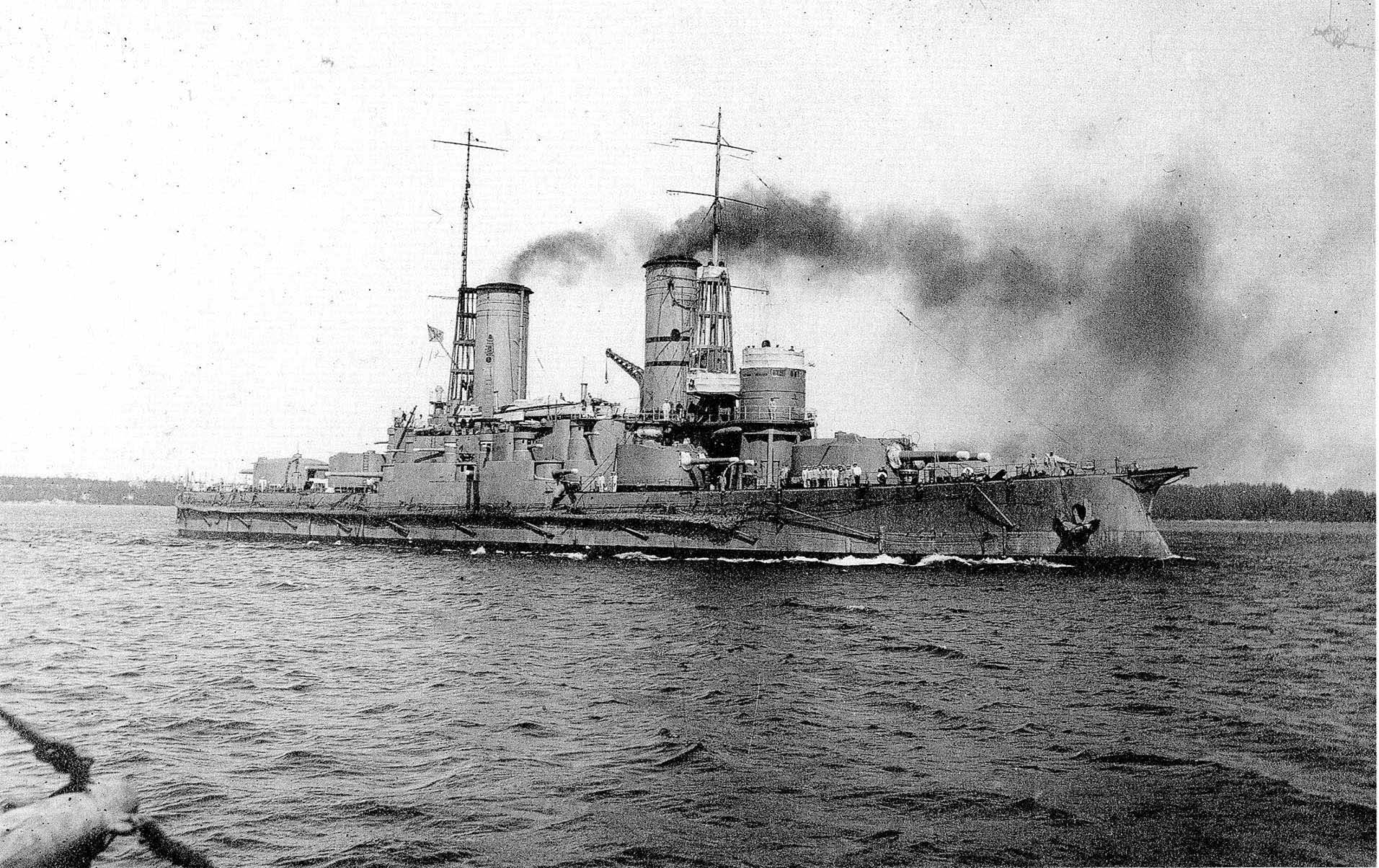
Imperator Pavel I during World War I. Note her cut-down lattice masts.

Imperator Pavel I was built by the Baltic Works in Saint Petersburg. Construction began on 27 October 1904 (Note: All dates used in this article are New Style) and was slowed by labor trouble in the shipyard from the 1905 Revolution. She was launched on 7 September 1907 and began her sea trials in October 1910. The ship entered service on 10 March 1911 before her trials were completed in October 1911. Imperator Pavel I joined the Baltic Fleet on completion and she made a port visit to Copenhagen in September 1912. The following September she visited Portland, Cherbourg, and Stavanger. At the beginning of World War I she covered Russian minelaying operations at the entrance of the Gulf of Finland. She did little else for the rest of the war as the Russian naval strategy in the Baltic was defensive; the four Gangut-class dreadnoughts and the two Andrei Pervozvanny-class predreadnoughts were to defend the entrance to the Gulf of Finland. The ship's lattice masts were cut down in late 1914 and light topmasts were added. Torpedo nets were fitted in early 1915 and the ship's torpedoes were removed in January 1916. In late 1916, four 76-millimeter (3 in) anti-aircraft guns were added.

Disgruntled sailors aboard Imperator Pavel I instigated the general mutiny of the Baltic Fleet in Helsinki on 16 March 1917, after they received word of the February Revolution in Saint Petersburg, and the ship was renamed Respublika (Republic) on 29 April. The Treaty of Brest-Litovsk required the Soviets to evacuate their naval base at Helsinki in March 1918 or have their ships interned by newly independent Finland even though the Gulf of Finland was still frozen over. Respublika and her sister ship Andrei Pervozvanny led the second group of ships on 5 April and reached Kronstadt five days later in what became known as the 'Ice Voyage'. The ship was laid up in October 1918 for lack of manpower and she was scrapped beginning on 22 November 1923. Curiously, Respublika was not formally stricken from the Navy List until 21 November 1925. Two of the 8-inch turrets were installed at the coastal battery No. 9 (later No. 333) near Leningrad (Saint Petersburg) at thirties. Both turrets are scrapped today, but some parts remained inside the concrete shafts.
