= Russian battleship Andrei Pervozvanny =

Andrei Pervozvanny-class battleship

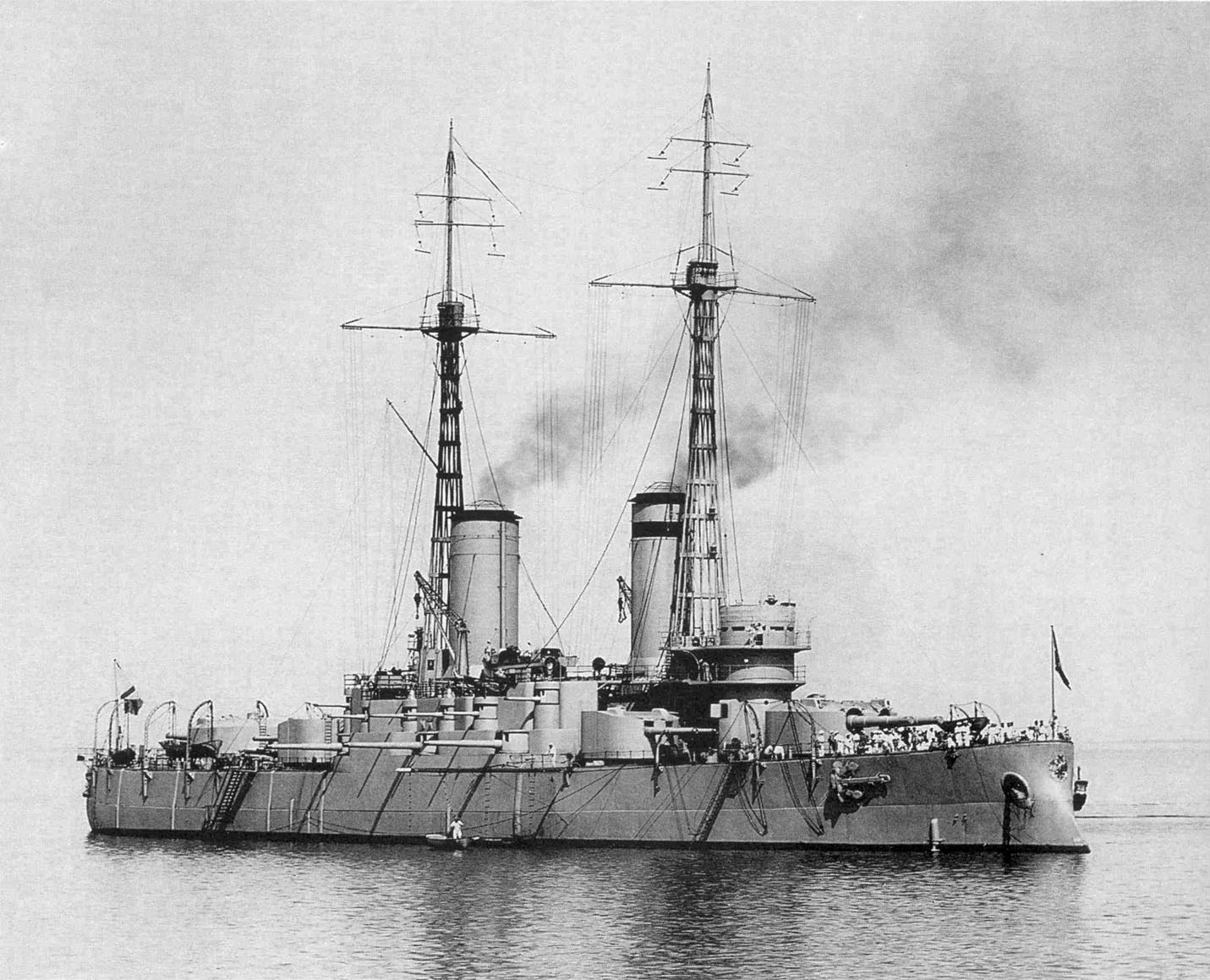
- Andrei Pervozvanny in 1912

History

Russian Empire
- Name: Andrei Pervozvanny
- Namesake: Saint Andrew
- Builder: Admiralty Shipyard, Saint Petersburg, Russia
- Laid down: 11 May 1905
- Launched: 30 October 1906
- In service: 10 March 1911

Soviet Union
- Acquired: November 1917
- Out of service: 1919
- Stricken: 21 November 1925
- Fate: Scrapped, 15 December 1923

General characteristics as built
- Class & type: Andrei Pervozvanny-class predreadnought battleship
- Displacement: 17,320 long tons (17,600 t); 18,580 long tons (18,880 t) (deep load)
- Length: 460 ft (140.2 m) (o/a)
- Beam: 80 ft (24.4 m)
- Draft: 27 ft (8.2 m)
- Installed power: 25 × Belleville boilers; 17,600 ihp (13,100 kW)
- Propulsion: 2 shafts; 2 triple-expansion steam engines
- Speed: 18.5 knots (34.3 km/h; 21.3 mph)
- Range: 2,100 nmi (3,900 km; 2,400 mi) at 12 knots (22 km/h; 14 mph)
- Complement: 956
- Armament: 2 × twin 12 in (305 mm) guns; 4 × twin, 6 × single 8 in (203 mm) guns; 12 × single 120 mm (4.7 in) guns; 4 × single 47 mm (1.9 in) guns; 2 × 457 mm (18 in) torpedo tubes
- Armor: Belt: 4–8.5 in (102–216 mm); Upper belt: 3.1–5 in (79–127 mm); Casemates: 3.1–5 in (79–127 mm); Conning tower: 4–8 in (102–203 mm); Main gun turrets: 8–10 in (203–54 mm); Main gun barbettes: 4–5 in (102–27 mm); Secondary gun turrets: 5–6 in (127–52 mm)

Andrei Pervozvanny (Russian: Андрей Первозванный—St Andrew the First-Called) was an Andrei Pervozvanny-class predreadnought battleship built for the Imperial Russian Navy during the early-1900s. The ship's construction was greatly delayed by design changes as a result of the Russo-Japanese War and labor unrest after the 1905 Revolution, and she took nearly six years to build. Andrei Pervozvanny was not very active during World War I and her bored sailors joined the general mutiny of the Baltic Fleet in early 1917. She was used by the Bolsheviks to bombard the rebellious garrison of Fort Krasnaya Gorka in 1919 during the Russian Civil War and was torpedoed by British Coastal Motor Boats shortly afterwards, as part of the Allied intervention in the Russian Civil War. The ship was never fully repaired and was scrapped in 1923.

== Description ==
Andrei Pervozvanny was 454 feet (138.4 m) long at the waterline and 460 feet (140.2 m) long overall. She had a beam of 80 feet (24.4 m) and a draft of 27 feet (8.2 m). The ship displaced 18,580 long tons (18,880 t) at deep load. The battleship had a double bottom and a metacentric height of 4 feet (1.2 m). The ship's crew consisted of 31 officers and 924 crewmen.

Andrei Pervozvanny was equipped with two 4-cylinder vertical triple-expansion steam engines with a total designed output of 17,600 indicated horsepower (13,100 kW). Twenty-five Belleville boilers provided steam to the engines. On sea trials, they produced 17,635 ihp (13,150 kW) and a top speed of 18.5 knots (34.3 km/h; 21.3 mph). She carried a normal load of 800 long tons (810 t) of coal that provided a range of 1,300 nautical miles (2,400 km; 1,500 mi) at a speed of 12 knots (22 km/h; 14 mph) and a maximum load of 1,500 long tons (1,500 t) that gave 2,400 nautical miles (4,400 km; 2,800 mi) at the same speed.

The main armament of the Andrei Pervozvanny class consisted of two pairs of 12-inch (305 mm) Model 1895 guns mounted in twin-gun turrets fore and aft of the superstructure. Eight of the fourteen 8-inch (203 mm) Model 1905 guns were mounted in four twin-gun turret at the corners of the superstructure while six were mounted in casemates in the superstructure. For defense against torpedo boats, the ships carried twelve 120-millimeter (4.7 in) guns mounted in casemates above the 8-inch guns in the superstructure. Two underwater 450-millimeter (17.7 in) torpedo tubes were mounted, one on each broadside, and they were provided with six spare torpedoes.

Based on the Russian experience at the Battle of Tsushima, the sides of the ship's hull were completely protected by Krupp cemented armor. The main waterline belt had a maximum thickness of 8.5 inches (216 mm) and the upper belt was 5 inches (127 mm) at its thickest. The sides of the main gun turrets were 8 inches (203 mm) thick and the armor of the casemates ranged from 3.1 to 5 inches (79 to 127 mm) in thickness. The greatest thickness of deck armor was 1.5 inches (38 mm).

== Service history ==
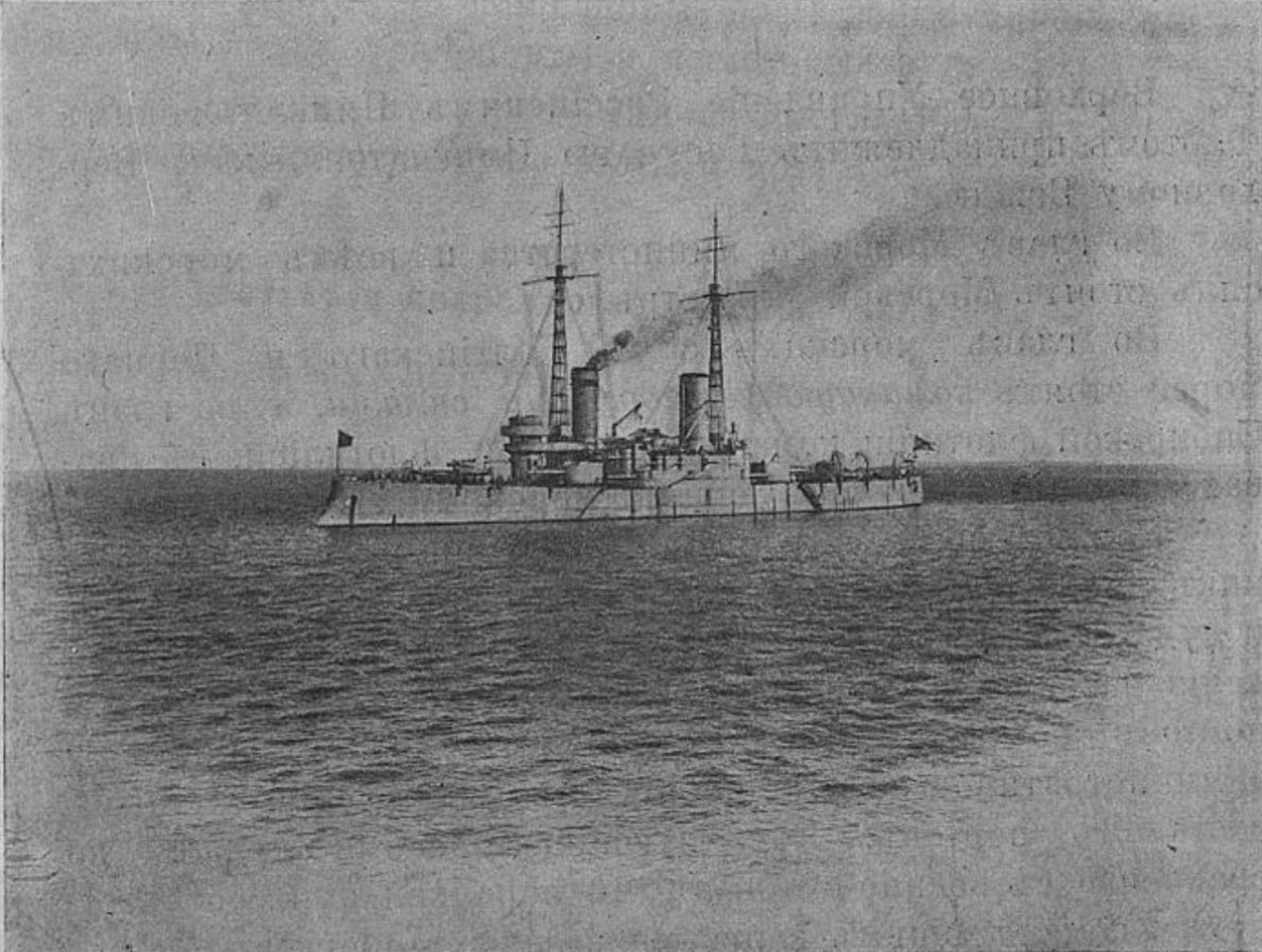
Andrei Pervozvanny c. 1912

Andrei Pervozvanny was built by the Admiralty Shipyard in Saint Petersburg. Construction began on 15 March 1904 (Note: All dates used in this article are New Style) and was officially laid down on 11 May. Her construction was slowed by labor trouble in the shipyard from the 1905 Revolution. She was launched on 30 October 1906 and began her sea trials in September 1910. They were completed in October 1910, but the ship entered service on 10 March 1911. Andrei Pervozvanny joined the Baltic Fleet on completion and she made a port visit to Copenhagen in September 1912. The following September she visited Portland, Cherbourg, and Stavanger together with her sister ship, Imperator Pavel I. She ran aground on Odensholm Island, off the Estonian coast, on 1 July 1914. The ship was still under repair when World War I began the following month. Her lattice masts were cut down and light topmasts were added while under repair.

Andrei Pervozvanny was mostly inactive during the war as the Russian naval strategy in the Baltic was defensive and they did not intend to seek out the German fleet. She ran aground in the Longgayen Pass on 12 November 1914. She was refloated on 14 November, repaired and returned to service. Torpedo nets were fitted in early 1915 and the ship's torpedoes were removed in January 1916. In late 1916, four 76-millimeter (3 in) anti-aircraft guns were added. The ship's crew joined the general mutiny of the Baltic Fleet in Helsinki on 16 March 1917, after they received word of the February Revolution in Saint Petersburg, and several of the ship's officers were murdered by the crew. The Treaty of Brest-Litovsk required the Soviets to evacuate their naval base at Helsinki in March 1918 or have their ships interned by newly independent Finland even though the Gulf of Finland was still frozen over. Andrei Pervozvanny and her sister ship the renamed Respublika, led the second group of ships on 5 April and reached Kronstadt five days later in what became known as the "Ice Voyage".

After the October Revolution in 1918, the ship remained on active duty as part of the Red Navy during the Russian Civil War. Between 13 and 15 June 1919, Andrei Pervozvanny and the dreadnought Petropavlovsk bombarded Fort Krasnaya Gorka whose garrison had mutinied against the Bolsheviks. The ship fired 170 12-inch and 408 8-inch shells and the garrison surrendered on 17 June when Leon Trotsky promised them their lives, only to order them machine-gunned. Andrei Pervozvanny was attacked by the Royal Navy during its Campaign in the Baltic 1918–19, when she was torpedoed by either C.M.B. 31 or C.M.B. 88 during the night of 17/18 August 1919 as the ship lay at anchor in Kronstadt. She was hit on the port bow and settled 2 feet (0.6 m) down by the bow. The British claimed three torpedo hits, but two of the torpedoes actually struck the harbor wall behind the battleship. The Victoria Cross, Britain's highest military decoration, was awarded to Commander Claude Congreve Dobson and Lieutenant Gordon Charles Steele for their successful attack. The ship was raised and docked, but never fully repaired. While under repair, she was nearly hit by a small bomb during a British air raid on 3 September. Scrapping of Andrei Pervozvanny began 15 December 1923, although she was not formally stricken until 21 November 1925.
