= Andrei Pervozvanny-class battleship =

Class of Russian pre-dreadnoughts

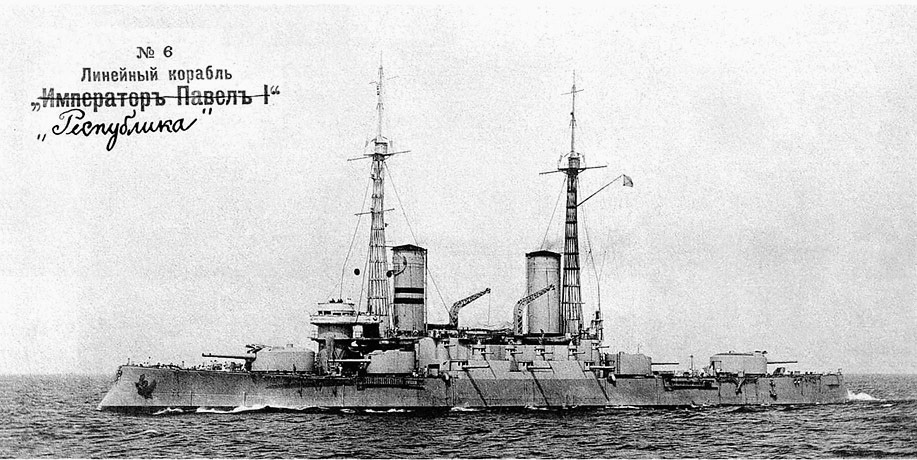
- Postcard of Imperator Pavel I underway with the original cage masts

Class overview
- Builders: Baltic Works; Galeryni Island Shipyard
- Operators: Imperial Russian Navy; Soviet Navy
- Preceded by: Evstafi class
- Succeeded by: Gangut class
- Built: 1904–1911
- In service: 1911–1919
- In commission: 1911–1924
- Planned: 2
- Completed: 2
- Scrapped: 2

General characteristics (as built)
- Type: Predreadnought battleship
- Displacement: 17,320 long tons (17,600 t); 18,580 long tons (18,880 t) (deep load)
- Length: 460 ft (140.2 m) (o/a)
- Beam: 80 ft (24.4 m)
- Draught: 29 ft 6 in (9 m) (deep load)
- Installed power: 17,600 ihp (13,100 kW); 25 Belleville boilers
- Propulsion: 2 Shafts, 2 triple-expansion steam engines
- Speed: 18.5 knots (34.3 km/h; 21.3 mph) (sea trials)
- Range: 2,400 nmi (4,400 km; 2,800 mi) at 12 knots (22 km/h; 14 mph)
- Complement: 955
- Armament: 2 twin 12 in (305 mm) guns; 4 × twin, 6 × single 8 in (203 mm) guns; 12 × single 120 mm (4.7 in) guns; 2 × 17.7 in (450 mm) torpedo tubes
- Armour: Belt: 4–8.5 in (102–216 mm); Upper belt: 3.1–5 in (79–127 mm); Casemates: 3.1–5 in (79–127 mm); Conning tower: 4–8 in (102–203 mm); Main-gun turrets: 8 in (203 mm); Barbettes: 4–5 in (102–127 mm); Secondary-gun turrets: 5–6 in (127–152 mm)

The Andrei Pervozvanny class were a pair of pre-dreadnought battleships built in the first decade of the twentieth century for the Baltic Fleet of the Imperial Russian Navy. They were conceived by the Naval Technical Committee in 1903 as an incremental development of the Borodino-class battleships with increased displacement and heavier secondary armament. The disastrous experiences of the Russo-Japanese War of 1904–1905 and the unrest resulting from the 1905 Russian Revolution led to countless redesigns, change orders and delays in construction. Despite the designers' repeated attempts to modernize the ships while under construction, they were obsolete in concept from the beginning, and even more so when they entered service in 1911.

In the first year of World War I, Andrei Pervozvanny and Imperator Pavel I formed the core of the Baltic Fleet. For most of the war they remained moored in the safety of Sveaborg and Helsingfors. (Note: Suomenlinna (former Sveaborg) is now part of the city of Helsinki (former Helsingfors). Sveaborg and Helsingfors were two separate bases of the Imperial Russian Navy.) Idle, demoralized ratings subscribed to Bolshevik ideology and on 16 March [O.S. 3 March] 1917 took control of the ships in a violent mutiny, killing many of their officers in the process. The battleships participated in the Ice Cruise of 1918, and Andrei Pervozvanny later helped to put down the Krasnaya Gorka fort mutiny of 1919. After the Kronstadt rebellion of 1921, the Bolshevik government lost interest in maintaining the battleships, and they were scrapped beginning in November–December 1923.

== Design ==
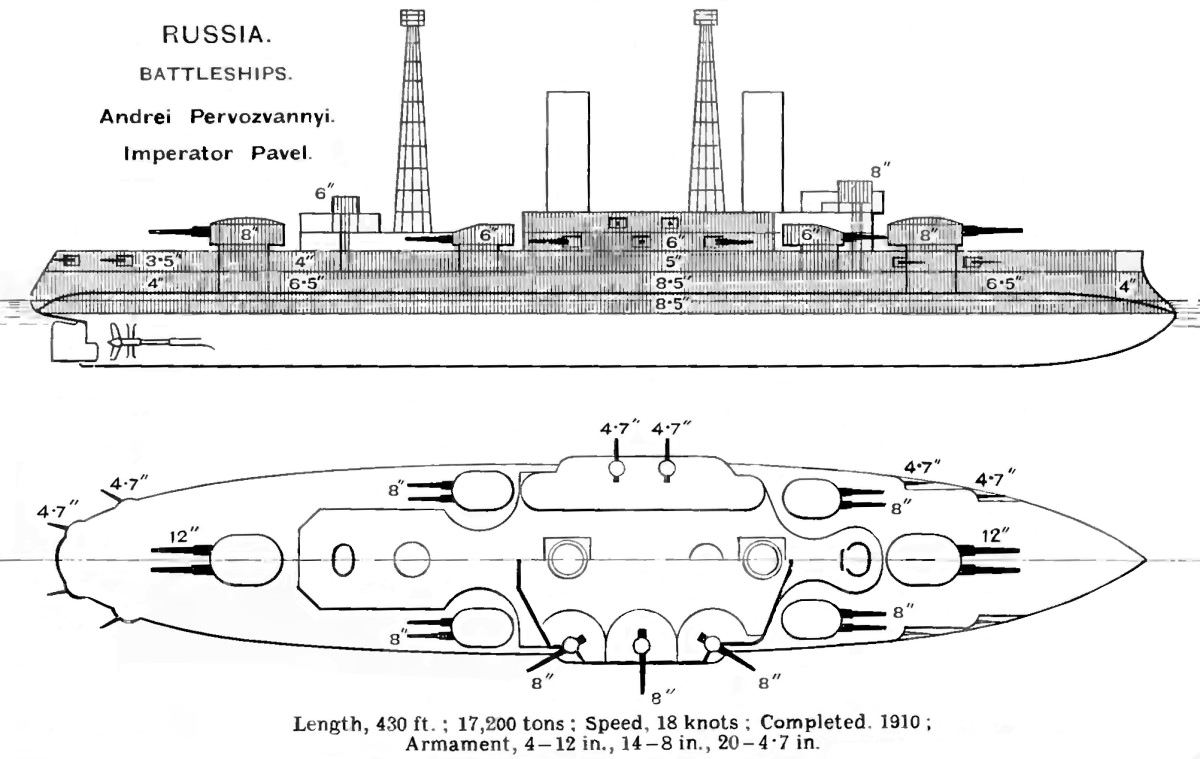
Right elevation and plan from Brassey's Naval Annual 1912. The shaded areas show the ships' armour.

The planned completion of the five Borodino-class battleships in 1904 would leave Russian shipbuilders with little work, so the Naval Technical Committee (NTC) organized a conference in late 1902 on the new 20-year shipbuilding program, which included money for four battleships in 1903 and 1904, a pair for the Black Sea Fleet (Evstafi class) and another pair for the Baltic Fleet. Based on the recommendations of the participants, the NTC chose a much larger and heavily armoured version of the Borodinos for the Baltic ships, with their secondary armament upgraded to 7.5-or-8-inch (191 or 203 mm) quick-firing guns rather than the 6-inch (152 mm) guns of the older ships. The initial estimate of the design's 16,500-long-ton (16,765 t) displacement became an informal upper limit which constrained the design of the ships.

At the beginning of 1903, the Russian Naval General Staff considered sketch designs by the designer of the Borodino class, Dmitry Skvortsov, and the NTC and selected the former's proposal. It also issued more detailed requirements for the new ships. They were to be fitted with 12- and 8-inch guns, each in twin-gun turrets, and equipped with twenty 75-millimetre (3 in) guns for defence against torpedo boats. Their protection was to consist of a 9-inch (229 mm) waterline belt with an upper strake of 7-inch (180 mm) armour or a uniform belt 8 inches thick. The speed of the battleships was to be no less than 18 knots (33 km/h; 21 mph) and they were to have a maximum draught of 26 feet (7.9 m) to allow passage through the Suez Canal. Concerned about stability, the staff reduced the superstructure by one deck. Skvortsov presented his drawings and calculations in June.

Skortsov warned about the unacceptable drag of the hull form that he was forced to use and Alexey Krylov, then chief of the Navy's ship model basin agreed, but nothing was done to improve its efficiency. Krylov's planned departure for the Far East forced the NTC to hasten official approval of the draft design. Their presentation on 4 July [O.S. 21 June] 1903 ended in an embarrassment: the NTC intended to award the contract for one of two new ships to Baltic Works, but did not even inform its master builder Sergey Ratnik about the project's existence. Ratnik, who had built two of the Borodino-class ships, believed that the new design was inferior to its predecessors. It had no displacement reserve compared to the 242 long tons (246 t) allowed for the Borodino class and the British standard of at least 4% of displacement. The NTC overruled his objections and approved the design for construction. At the end of July, Ratnik appealed to the NTC again, arguing that the mechanisms and systems overlooked by the designers would add 500–600 long tons (510–610 t) to the ship's weight. The NTC dismissed his complaint and proceeded with the flawed design. In line with Russian practice of the period, it was a collective work signed off by a ring of designers and bureaucrats. No one dared to take the lead and assume full responsibility. In August the NTC finalized the design with only marginal improvements. On 29 August [O.S. 16 August] 1903 the Ministry of the Navy awarded construction contracts to the Galernyi Island Shipyard (Andrei Pervozvanny) and the Baltic Works (Imperator Pavel I) in Saint Petersburg.

== Construction ==
Actual work on Andrei Pervozvanny commenced on 15 March [O.S. 2 March] 1904 and construction began on Imperator Pavel I on 27 October [O.S. 14 October] 1904. Coal-firing boilers and steam engines were ordered from the Franco-Russian Works. In an inexplicable twist of the NTC bureaucracy, engines for the two sister ships were ordered to different specifications. In line with Russian tradition Andrei Pervozvanny was formally laid down in May 1905, after more than a year of construction work. The ceremony coincided with the beginning of a six-month hiatus (May–October 1905) caused by the 1905 Russian Revolution. Baltic Works cancelled the laying-down ceremony of Imperator Pavel I altogether: officially, Pavel was laid down and launched on the same date, 7 September [O.S. 25 August] 1907.

Construction proceeded at a slow pace, frequently interrupted by redesign proposals, change orders, rework and inevitable delays. After the completion of Andrei Pervozvanny its builders identified seventeen distinct stages of its design. The sinking of the battleship Petropavlovsk in April 1904, which was blamed on a detonation of its stored naval mines or the forward 12-inch magazine, or both, compelled the NTC to reconsider the use of mines. Russian battleships carried their own stock of naval mines to protect themselves at anchorage, even when accompanied by minelayers and destroyers. The NTC banned mines from battleships on 9 November [O.S. 27 October] 1904. In December 1904 the NTC also agreed to strip the new battleships of their stern torpedo tubes, but kept the bow and broadside tubes. In mid-1905 the torpedo armament was reduced to only two broadside tubes.

The NTC flooded Skvortsov in 1905 with a chain of conflicting and poorly formulated change orders influenced by war-time experience. The war demonstrated the uselessness of keeping small-calibre guns on capital ships; in 9 May [O.S. 26 April] 1905 the NTC replaced the 47-millimetre (1.9 in) guns with more 75 mm guns in an upper-deck casemate. The 75 mm guns were replaced with 120-millimetre (4.7 in) guns on 30 May [O.S. 17 May] 1905, a few days after the Battle of Tsushima. More thorough analysis of the battle revealed that earlier Russian ships relied too much on unarmoured plating to preserve stability and that splinters from shells that penetrated the unarmoured sides could damage or disable important equipment like ammunition hoists and boiler exhausts. The additional armour required to cover the entire side of the design boosted its displacement to 17,151 long tons (17,426 t) as of late 1905. In May 1906, the NTC decided to save weight by replacing the central 8-inch turret with three 8-inch guns in casemates. It also eliminated openings in the sides of the hull such as gun embrasures and portholes, believing that they were a flooding danger if damaged or if the ship had a list. This caused major problems with ventilation and adversely affecting their habitability, while the 120-millimetre guns had to be moved to positions above the central casemate.

Assessment of the damage incurred in the Battle of the Yellow Sea led the NTC to another incorrect conclusion. The NTC tacticians noted that a single hit on the mast of Tsesarevich had nearly knocked it down; a fallen mast would have probably disabled its secondary-gun turrets. Lattice masts, introduced with the American South Carolina-class battleships, seemed to be a robust solution and the Andrei Pervozvanny-class ships became the only Russian battleships fitted with them. They proved to be unstable and prone to vibration in service and the signal positions in them were regularly enveloped by funnel gases. Despite those drawbacks, the captain of Andrei Pervozvanny fiercely defended them and objected to all alternatives proposed by the NTC. On the day when Austria-Hungary declared war against Russia, the captain of Imperator Pavel I, who held an opposite opinion, volunteered to replace the masts in three days. Fleet commander Admiral Nikolai von Essen concurred, and by the middle of August 1914, the old lattice masts were largely gone. Both ships retained the lower baskets of their masts, cut at different heights.

== Description ==
The Andrei Pervozvanny-class ships were 454 feet (138.4 m) long at the waterline and 460 feet (140.2 m) long overall. They had a beam of 80 feet (24.4 m) and a draught of 29 ft 6 in (9 m) at deep load. The ships displaced 17,320 long tons (17,600 t) at normal load and 18,580–18,902 long tons (18,878–19,205 t) at deep load. Their hull was subdivided by 17 transverse watertight bulkheads and the engine rooms were divided by a centreline longitudinal bulkhead. They had a double bottom and a metacentric height of 4 feet (1.2 m). The ships' crew consisted of 31 officers and 924 crewmen.

The ships had two 4-cylinder vertical triple-expansion steam engines, each driving a 18-foot-5-inch (5.6 m) propeller, using steam provided by twenty-five Belleville boilers at a working pressure of 285 pounds per square inch (1,970 kPa; 20.0 kgf/cm^{2}). The engines had a total designed output of 17,600 indicated horsepower (13,100 kW). During the ships' sea trials, they produced 17,635–18,596 ihp (13,150–13,867 kW) and gave the sisters a top speed of 18.5 knots (34.3 km/h; 21.3 mph). The ships carried a maximum load of 1,500 long tons (1,500 t) of coal that gave 2,400 nautical miles (4,400 km; 2,800 mi) at a speed of 12 knots (22 km/h; 14 mph). Electricity was provided by six steam-driven dynamos.

=== Armament ===
The main armament consisted of four 12-inch (305 mm) Model 1895 40-caliber guns mounted in twin-gun turrets fore and aft. These guns had a maximum elevation of 35° and could depress to -5°. Eighty rounds per gun were carried and they could fire about one round per minute. The guns could be loaded at any angle between +5° and -3°. They fired a 1,038-pound (470.9 kg) M1911 armour-piercing (AP) shell at a muzzle velocity of 2,702 ft/s (823.5 m/s). At maximum elevation the guns had a range of 22,000 yards (20,000 m).

Eight of the fourteen 50-caliber eight-inch (203 mm) Model 1905 guns were mounted in four twin-gun turrets at the corners of the superstructure while six were mounted in casemates in the superstructure. The turret-mounted guns had a rate of fire of two rounds per minute and a maximum elevation of +25° while the casemate guns were faster at 2.8 rounds per minute, but could only elevate to +19°. Each gun was provided with 128 rounds. Their M1913 shells weighed 307 pounds (139.2 kg) and were fired at a muzzle velocity of 2,600 ft/s (792.5 m/s) to a range of 17,270 yards (15,792 m) at an elevation of +15°10'.

For close-range defence against torpedo boats, the ships carried twelve 120-millimetre (4.7 in) guns mounted in casemates above the eight-inch guns in the superstructure. The corner guns were positioned to give them a clear field of fire over the eight-inch gun turrets. They had a rate of fire of 10 rounds per minute and the ships carried a total of 2,628 rounds (219 per gun) for them. While their maximum elevation was +23°, they had a range of 11,007 yards (10,065 m) at +18° using their 45.1-pound (20.47 kg) AP shell.

Two underwater 450-millimetre (17.7 in) torpedo tubes were mounted, one on each side, and they were provided with six spare torpedoes. The ships would have used M1908 torpedoes that had three range/speed settings: 1,100 yards (1,000 m) at 34 knots (63 km/h; 39 mph), 2,200 yards (2,000 m) at 27 knots (50 km/h; 31 mph), or 3,300 yards (3,000 m) at 23 knots (43 km/h; 26 mph).

=== Protection ===
The sides of the hull were completely protected by Krupp cemented armour. The main waterline belt had a thickness of 8.5 inches (216 mm) abreast the engine and boiler rooms and tapered to a thickness of 6 inches (152 mm) at the lower edge. Abreast the main gun magazines the belt was 6.5 inches (165 mm) in thickness and extended to the bow using plates with a thickness of 5 inches (127 mm). Aft of the rear magazine the belt used 4.5-inch (114 mm) and 4-inch (102 mm) plates to the stern. The belt was 10 feet (3 m) high, of which 4 feet (1.2 m) was underwater. The upper strake of armour had a maximum thickness of 5 inches amidships and it was 8 feet 9 inches (2.7 m) high. It extended to the ends of the ship in plates 4 and 3.13 inches (80 mm) thick.

The front and sides of the main-gun turrets were 8 inches thick and their roofs were 2.5 inches (64 mm) thick. Their barbettes ranged from 4 to 5 inches in thickness. The armour plates on the front and sides of the secondary-gun turrets were 6 and 5 inches thick, respectively, and their roofs were 2.5 inches thick. The barbettes for the secondary turrets were protected by armour 4 inches thick. Protection for the single 8-inch guns consisted of 5-inch armour plates on the sides of the casemate while the transverse bulkheads protecting the guns ranged from 4 (on the centreline) to 5 inches in thickness. The gun shields for the single guns were 3.5 inches (89 mm) thick. Armour plates protecting the 120 mm guns were 3.1 inches (79 mm) thick. A 2-inch (51 mm) centreline bulkhead divided the casemate and the armour protecting the funnel uptakes ranged in thickness from 0.625 to 1 inch (16 to 25 mm). The greatest thickness of deck armour was 1.5 inches (38 mm).

== Ships ==
Name	Namesake	Builder	Construction commenced	Laid down ceremony	Launched	Entered service	Fate
Andrei Pervozvanny	Andrew the First-Called	Galeryni Island Shipyard, Saint Petersburg	15 March [O.S. 2 March] 1904	11 May [O.S. 28 April] 1905	20 October [O.S. 7 October] 1906	10 March [O.S. 25 February] 1911	Scrapped, 15 December [O.S. 2 December] 1923
Imperator Pavel I	Tsar Paul I	Baltic Works, Saint Petersburg	27 October [O.S. 14 October] 1904	Cancelled until launch	7 September [O.S. 25 August] 1907	10 March [O.S. 25 February] 1911	Scrapped, 22 November [O.S. 9 November] 1923

== Service histories ==
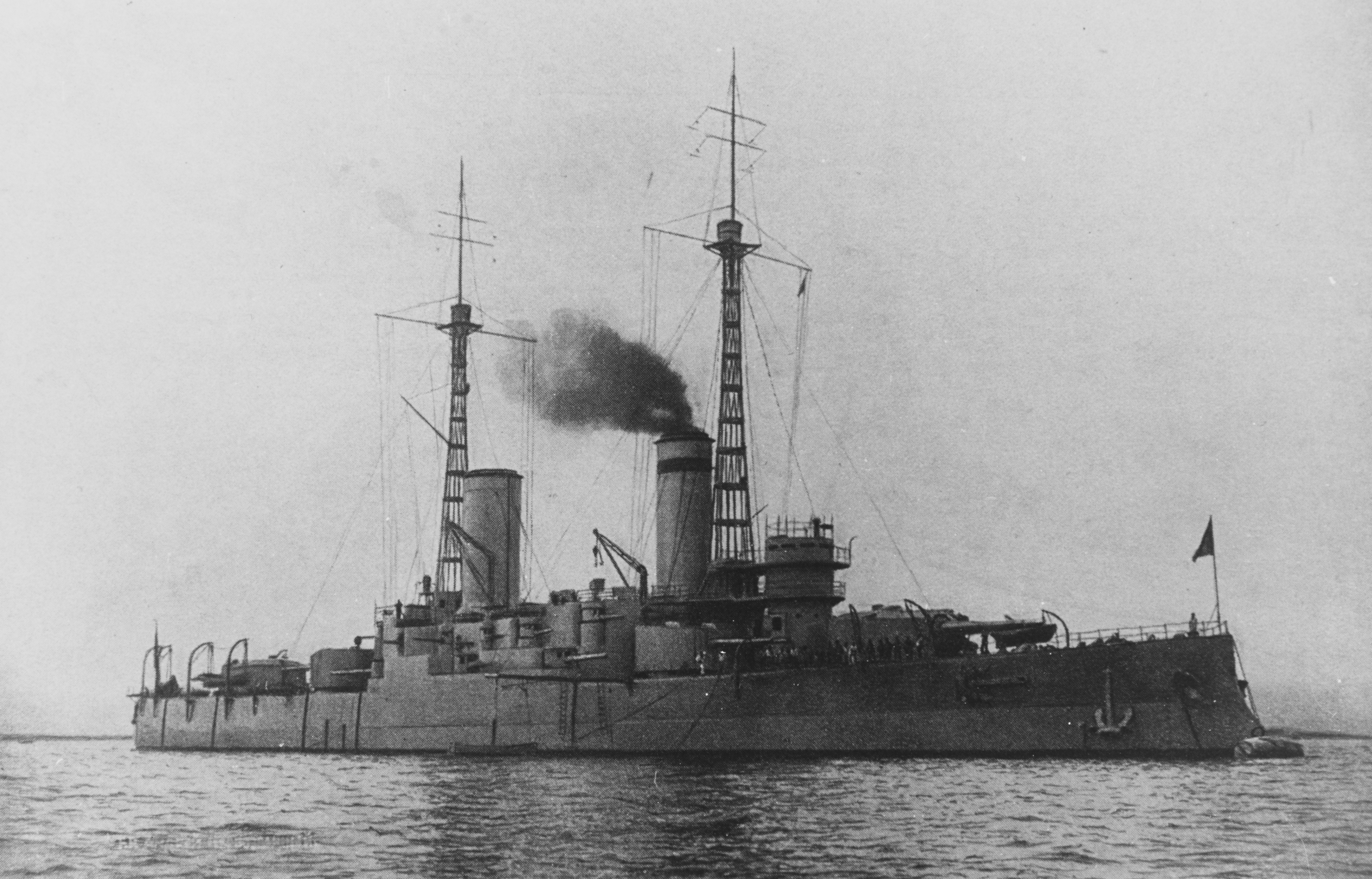
Andrei Pervozanny about 1913

The sisters conducted their sea trials in September–October 1910. They turned out very "wet" ships even in calm seas because the protruding bow ram forced the bow wave up and over the forecastle. On one high-speed voyage to Reval (modern Tallinn), Estonia, in October during Force 3–4 weather, Imperator Pavel I's captain reported that the forecastle was covered by "a mass of water, in the form of a solid, unbroken rain of spray, flooding not only the upper deck, but also the 12- and 8-inch turrets, the lower bridge, conning tower and it even struck the 120 mm casemate deck". Ivan Bubnov recommended fitting Andrei's ram with a scoop-shaped fairing, which was intended to decrease bow-wave height from 22 feet (6.7 m) to 14 feet (4.3 m) and eliminate flooding, but the NTC shelved the proposal. The powerplants of both ships performed well at the speed trials, but post-trial examination of Imperator Pavel I revealed unacceptable defects of its boilers, engine cylinders and crankshaft bearings. The NTC had no funds to replace the defective boilers and postponed the repairs until the following year, but this did not happen as the navy committed all available financing to the dreadnought program. Andrei Pervozvanny and Imperator Pavel I were not properly completed until late 1912.

They saw very limited seagoing service in 1910 through 1912; their few voyages within Baltic waters were trials, rather than active duty. Their combat readiness was crippled by shortage of personnel. Absence of proper portholes and the limited capacity of the electrical ventilation fans made living conditions unbearable, thus commissioned officers evaded transfer to the "ugly sisters" at all costs. The NTC seriously considered cutting portholes through the armour, but found it too expensive to be done. The ratings sabotaged the system by jamming the fan switches in "on" position, which caused frequent electrical failures. The Navy "fixed the problem" by building steel lockers around the switches (Note: In late 1911 the engineer of Imperator Pavel I ordered 105 steel lockers for protecting electrical switches from unauthorized access.) but could not contain the discontent of the sailors.

On 21 June [O.S. 8 June] 1912 officers of Imperator Pavel I received first warnings of a conspiracy among the ratings, who allegedly planned an open mutiny on the night of July 24–25. In the few days preceding the strike the sailors openly disobeyed and taunted their officers, but refrained from violence. Only a minority of the ratings (around 160) subscribed to the mutiny; the majority remained loyal and kept the officers informed. On July 24 the ringleaders were arrested, more arrests followed throughout July and August. 53 sailors of Imperator Pavel I were sentenced to terms ranging from six months to sixteen years. (Note: In addition to the men from Imperator Pavel I, the government prosecuted 23 men from Tsesarevich and 13 men from Rurik. These two ships have already seen mass disobedience and mass arrests in April 1912.) Attempts to spread the mutiny to Andrei Pervozvanny were foiled at the very beginning. The sisters made a port visit to Copenhagen, Denmark, in September 1912. A year later they made port visits to Portland, England, Cherbourg Naval Base, France, and Stavanger, Norway, in September 1913. At this time the ships still harbored active Bolshevik militants, notably the future Red Army commander Pavel Dybenko, the future chief of the Soviet Black Sea Fleet and naval historian Nikolay Izmaylov and the future chief of the Soviet Navy Ivan Sladkov. Andrei Pervozvanny ran aground on Osmussaar Island off the Estonian coast on 1 July [O.S. 18 June] 1914 and was under repair for several months afterwards.

=== World War I ===
During June–July 1914 the ships represented the Empire in joint naval reviews with friendly British, (Note: Sir David Beatty visited the Baltic with Queen Mary, Princess Royal and New Zealand in June 1914. The joint fleet review began on 17 June [O.S. 4 June] 1914.) French (Note: President of France Raymond Poincaré visited Saint Petersburg in July 1914 accompanied by Jean Bart, France and multiple destroyers. The fleet review in the mouth of the Neva River was held on 21 July [O.S. 8 July] 1914.) and Dutch (Note: The Dutch cruiser Zeeland visited Saint Petersburg in the middle of July 1914.) ships in the Gulf of Finland. Sweden had not yet declared its neutrality, and, on 10 August [O.S. 28 July] 1914, Imperator Pavel I, the predreadnoughts Slava and Tsesarevich and the armoured cruiser Rurik sailed out to Stockholm to intimidate the Swedes. The diplomats called the fleet back, and Imperator Pavel I missed her chance to engage a weak German scouting flotilla operating in the same area. In August–September the battleships actively sailed north of the Gulf of Riga, but failed to intercept the German cruisers Augsburg and Blücher that were operating in the area.

The torpedoing of the armoured cruiser Pallada by the German submarine SM U-26 on 11 October [O.S. 28 September] 1914 effectively confined both Andrei Pervozvanny-class ships to harbour for the rest of the war. All battleships were ordered to return to safety of Finnish bases and stay there until the Navy could cope with the submarine threat. Slava and Tsesarevich returned to action in the Battle of the Gulf of Riga in 1915, but Imperator Pavel I remained moored in Helsingfors. Andrei Pervozvanny was mobilized for active operations twice, in April and November 1916. The first operation, a raid on a German convoy near the Swedish coast, was a moderate success; the second ended in a humiliating retreat after Rurik struck a mine laid by the German submarine UC 27. In October 1916 the crew of Imperator Pavel I, demoralized by boredom and Bolshevik propaganda, refused to obey orders and demanded better rations and easing of service. The Navy preferred to appease the sailors, and the ringleaders escaped punishment. (Note: Fifteen years later Leonid Sobolev, a former officer on Imperator Pavel I, described the explosive environment and Bolshevik propaganda on board of his ship in The Big Refit; in an act of self-censorship he changed the name of his "lead character" to Generalissimus Suvorov.) In late 1916, the ships were fitted with four 3-inch Lender anti-aircraft guns.

=== Revolution ===
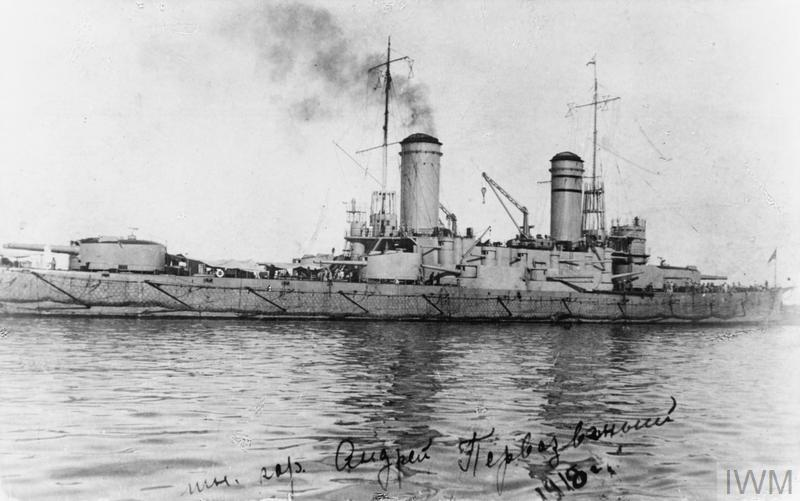
Andrei Pervozanny, 1919

During the outbreak of the February Revolution of 1917, both battleships were moored in Helsinki. The ratings, demoralized by idle life and revolutionary propaganda, had already been organized for a mutiny by a well-entrenched core of conspirators. The exact history of the fleet revolt has been sanitized by Soviet historiography in the wake of the Kronstadt rebellion. It is known that the revolt of 16 March [O.S. 3 March] 1917 was coordinated from Imperator Pavel I. Sailors of Imperator Pavel I took control of the ship, killed the officers who stood in their way and signalled instructions to other ships. The two battleships accounted for the majority of casualties of this day. The captain of Imperator Pavel I did not even try to subdue the sailors and save his officers; he survived the mutiny and was killed by the Cheka in 1921. The captain of Andrei Pervozvanny opposed the revolt and emigrated overseas. The commander of the battleship squadron refused to confront the sailors and was killed on shore.

The ratings almost completely subscribed to communism, 520 sailors of Imperator Pavel I were carrying Bolshevik party cards by the end of April. On 9 June [O.S. 27 May] 1917, the ship was renamed Respublika. The ship provided quarters to civilian Bolshevik functionaries who felt unsafe among the ethnic Finns of Helsinki. The disorganized crew declared allegiance to the Russian Provisional Government and even sailed out for a gunnery practice on orders from Alexander Kerensky. In August 1917 Respublika escorted Slava to her last station at Moon Sound. The latter was scuttled during Operation Albion, but neither Respublika nor Andrei Pervozvanny was sent to support her.

The Treaty of Brest-Litovsk of 1917 required the Soviets to evacuate their naval base at Helsinki in March 1918 or have their ships interned by newly independent Finland even though the Gulf of Finland was still frozen over. The sisters led the second group of ships on 5 April and reached Kronstadt five days later in what became known as the "Ice Voyage". Respublika was hulked in September 1918 and saw no further activity. Andrei Pervozvanny, now commanded by Lev Galler, although neglected by its revolutionary crew, remained in active service. On June 13–15, together with the dreadnought Petropavlovsk, the ship bombarded Fort Krasnaya Gorka whose garrison had mutinied against the Bolsheviks. She fired 170 main-gun shells and 408 eight-inch shells and the garrison surrendered on June 17 when Leon Trotsky promised them their lives, only to subsequently order them machine-gunned. Two months later, on the night of August 16/17, 1919, British Coastal Motor Boats attacked ships in Kronstadt harbour with torpedoes. One hit Andrei Pervozvanny's armour belt, killing one sailor and flooding an isolated watertight compartment. Repairs continued slowly until the Kronstadt Rebellion of 1921 and completely stopped after its suppression due to a lack of resources. The sisters were sent to the breaker's yard in November–December 1923.

== Sources ==
- Friedman, Norman (2011). Naval Weapons of World War One: Guns, Torpedoes, Mines and ASW Weapons of All Nations: An Illustrated Directory. Barnsley, UK: Seaforth. ISBN 978-1-84832-100-7.
- Gutthridge, Leonard. F. (2006). Mutiny: A History of Naval Insurrection. Annapolis, Maryland: Naval Institute Press. ISBN 1-59114-348-9.
- Harris, Mark (2025). The First World War in the Baltic Sea. Vol. 1: Essen's Triumph, 1914 to February 1915. Helion. ISBN 978-1-804519-10-3.
- Head, Michael (2009). "The Baltic Campaign, 1918–1920, Pts. I, II". Warship International. XLVI (2–3): 135–150, 217–239. ISSN 0043-0374.
- McLaughlin, Stephen (2003). Russian & Soviet Battleships. Annapolis, Maryland: Naval Institute Press. ISBN 1-55750-481-4.
- Melnikov, Rafail. M. (2003). Lineyny korabl "Andrey Pervozvanny" (1906–1925) (Линейный корабль "Андрей Первозванный" (1906–1925)). Saint Petersburg: Korabli i srazheniya. (in Russian) (no ISBN)
- Melnikov, Rafail. M. (2005). Lineyny korabl "Imperator Pavel I" (1906–1925) (Линейный корабль "Император Павел I" (1906–1925)). Samara: ANO Istflot. (in Russian) ISBN 5-98830-013-8.
- Taras, Alexander (2000). Корабли Российского императорского флота 1892–1917 гг. [Ships of the Imperial Russian Navy 1892–1917]. Library of Military History (in Russian). Minsk: Kharvest. ISBN 978-985-433-888-0.
- Vinogradov, Sergei E. (1998). "Battleship Development in Russia from 1905 to 1917". Warship International. XXXV (3): 267–290. ISSN 0043-0374.
