= Evstafi-class battleship =

Class of Russian pre-dreadnoughts

- Evstafi at anchor, 1911

Class overview
- Builders: Nikolayev Admiralty Shipyard; ROPiT
- Operators: Imperial Russian Navy
- Preceded by: Borodino class
- Succeeded by: Andrei Pervozvanny class
- Built: 1903–1910
- In service: 1911–1918
- In commission: 1910–1918
- Completed: 2
- Scrapped: 2

General characteristics
- Type: Pre-dreadnought battleship
- Displacement: 12,738 long tons (12,942 t)
- Length: 385 ft 9 in (117.6 m)
- Beam: 74 ft (22.6 m)
- Draught: 28 ft (8.5 m)
- Installed power: 10,600 ihp (7,904 kW)
- Propulsion: 2 shafts, 2 Vertical triple expansion steam engines; 22 coal-fired Belleville water-tube boilers
- Speed: 16 knots (30 km/h; 18 mph)
- Range: 2,100 nmi (3,900 km; 2,400 mi) at 10 knots (19 km/h; 12 mph)
- Complement: 928
- Armament: 2 × 2 - 12-inch (305 mm) guns; 4 × 1 - 8-inch (203 mm) guns; 12 × 1 - 6-inch (152 mm) guns; 14 × 1 - 75-millimetre (3.0 in) guns; 2 × 1 - 17.7-inch (450 mm) torpedo tubes
- Armour: Krupp armour; Belt: 7–9 inches (178–229 mm); Deck: 1.37–2.75 inches (35–70 mm); Turrets: 10 inches (254 mm); Barbettes: 10 inches (254 mm); Conning tower: 8 inches (203 mm); Bulkheads: 7 inches (178 mm)

The Evstafi class were a pair of pre-dreadnought battleships of the Imperial Russian Navy built before World War I for the Black Sea Fleet. They were slightly enlarged versions of the Potemkin, with increased armour and more guns. Numerous alterations were made as a result of experience in the Russo-Japanese War of 1904–5 that seriously delayed the completion of the two ships.

They were the most modern ships in the Black Sea Fleet when World War I began and formed the core of the fleet for the first year of the war, before the newer dreadnoughts entered service. They forced the German battlecruiser SMS Goeben to disengage during the Battle of Cape Sarych shortly after Russia declared war on the Ottoman Empire in late 1914. Both ships covered several bombardments of the Bosphorus fortifications in early 1915, including one where they were attacked by the Goeben, but they managed to drive her off. Later, Evstafi and Ioann Zlatoust were relegated to secondary roles after the first dreadnought entered service in late 1915, and were subsequently put into reserve in 1918 in Sevastopol.

Both ships were captured when the Germans took the city in May 1918 and were turned over to the Allies after the Armistice in November 1918. Their engines were destroyed in 1919 by the British when they withdrew from Sevastopol to prevent the advancing Bolsheviks from using them against the White Russians. They were abandoned when the Whites evacuated the Crimea in 1920 and were scrapped in 1922–23.

== Description ==
=== General characteristics ===
The two Evstafi-class ships were 379 feet (115.5 m) long at the waterline and 385 feet 9 inches (117.6 m) long overall. They had a beam of 74 feet (22.6 m) and a draught of 28 feet (8.5 m). They displaced 12,855 long tons (13,061 t), only 120 long tons (122 t) more than their designed displacement of 12,738 long tons (12,942 t). The Evstafi class were slightly larger than Potemkin, being 8 feet 3 inches (2.5 m) longer, 1 foot (0.3 m) wider, but displaced 45 long tons (46 t) less. The ships had a double bottom from frames 18 to 82. They were divided into 10 main compartments by transverse watertight bulkheads. They also had a centreline longitudinal bulkhead, presumably separating the engine rooms.

=== Propulsion ===
The Evstafi class had two three-cylinder vertical triple expansion steam engines built by ONZiV in Nikolayev that had a total designed output of 10,600 indicated horsepower (7,900 kW). Twenty-two Belleville water-tube boilers provided steam to the engines at a pressure of 242 psi (1,669 kPa; 17 kgf/cm^{2}), which drove two screw propellers. On sea trials, the powerplant produced a total over 10,800 ihp (8,100 kW) and a top speed of 16.2 knots (30.0 km/h; 18.6 mph). They carried a maximum of 1,100 long tons (1,100 t) of coal at full load that provided a range of 2,100 nautical miles (3,900 km; 2,400 mi) at a speed of 10 knots (19 km/h; 12 mph). Two steam-powered dynamos were carried with a total output of 300 kW, as well as two auxiliary dynamos rated at 64 kW each.

=== Armament ===
The main armament consisted of two pairs of 12-inch 40-calibre Pattern 1895 guns mounted in hydraulically powered twin turrets fore and aft. Each turret had a firing arc of 260 degrees. The guns had a rate of fire of 40 seconds between rounds and 75 rounds per gun were carried. These guns had a maximum elevation of 35 degrees and could depress to -5 degrees. They fired a 731.3-pound (331.7 kg) shell at a muzzle velocity of 2,598 ft/s (792 m/s) to a range of 22,200 yards (20,300 m) at maximum elevation.

All four 8-inch (203 mm) 50-calibre Pattern 1905 guns were mounted in the corners of the superstructure in armoured casemates. These guns had a firing arc of 120 degrees and could fire straight ahead or astern. They had a range of elevation from -5 degrees to +20 degrees. The guns fired a high explosive shell that weighed 264.3 pounds (119.9 kg) at a muzzle velocity of 2,647 ft/s (807 m/s). At 19.5 degrees elevation it could range out to 15,800 yards (14,400 m). 110 rounds were stowed per gun.

The dozen 6-inch (152 mm) Canet Pattern 1892 45-calibre guns were mounted in the lower casemates. The guns could elevate to a maximum of 20 degrees and depress to -5 degrees. They fired shells that weighed 91.27 lb (41.40 kg) with a muzzle velocity of 2,600 ft/s (790 m/s). They had a maximum range of 12,600 yards (11,500 m) when fired at maximum elevation. The ships carried 180 rounds per gun.

The anti-torpedo boat armament consisted of fourteen 75-millimetre (3.0 in) Canet Pattern 1892 50-calibre guns mounted in sponsons on the upper deck, protected by gun shields. The gun fired 10.8-pound (4.9 kg) shells to a range of about 8,600 yards (7,864 m) at its maximum elevation of 21 degrees with a muzzle velocity of 2,700 ft/s (820 m/s). The rate of fire was between 12 and 15 rounds per minute.

The Evstafi class carried two 17.7-inch (450 mm) torpedo tubes on the broadside aft. These torpedoes carried a 212-pound (96 kg) warhead of TNT. It had two speed settings which gave it a maximum range of 3,280 yards (3,000 m) at 29 knots (54 km/h; 33 mph) or 2,190 yards (2,000 m) at 34 knots (63 km/h; 39 mph).

=== Protection ===
The Evstafi-class ships used Krupp armour. The maximum thickness of the waterline belt was 9 inches (229 mm) which reduced to 7–8 inches (178–203 mm) abreast the magazines. It covered about 157 feet (47.9 m) of the ship's length. The belt was 7 feet 6 inches (2.3 m) high, including 4 feet (1.2 m) below the waterline. The belt terminated in 7-inch (178 mm) transverse bulkheads. The belt was extended to the bow by armour plates 3–4 inches (76–102 mm) thick and to the stern by 2–3-inch (51–76 mm) armour.

The upper belt was six inches thick and was intended to protect the gap between the waterline belt and the casemate. The casemate protected the six and eight-inch guns and was 5 inches (127 mm) thick; 1.5-inch (38 mm) bulkheads separated each gun. The sides of the turrets were 10 inches (254 mm) thick and they had a 2.5-inch (64 mm) roof. Their barbettes were also 10 inches thick, although this was reduced to five inches where they were screened behind other armour. The two conning towers' sides were 8 inches (203 mm) in thickness with a 3-inch (76 mm) roof. The decks ranged from 1.37–3 inches (35–76 mm) in thickness.

== Ships ==
Construction of both ships began well before the formal keel-laying ceremony; Evstafi on 13 July 1904 (Note: All dates used in this article are New Style) and Ioann Zlatoust on 13 July 1903, although the working drawings and preliminary calculations were not approved until 31 May 1904, which caused some problems with Ioann Zlatoust. Progress was relatively quick, despite the disruptions caused by the 1905 Revolution, and both ships were launched less than three years after work began. Fitting-out, however, was considerably delayed by a number of changes made as the navy digested the lessons of the Russo-Japanese War. Maximum elevation of the main guns was increased from 15 degree to 35 degrees, the number of torpedo tubes was reduced from five to two, mine stowage was eliminated as were the 47-millimetre (1.9 in) guns. The armour protection of the waterline fore and aft of the main belt was increased to prevent the sort of damage that disabled several ships at the Battle of Tsushima. A second conning tower was added at the rear of the superstructure and its design was altered, probably to eliminate the overhanging top that deflected splinters into the conning tower at the Battle of the Yellow Sea and Tsushima. The masts and their fighting tops were replaced by light pole masts and light booms replaced the heavy boat cranes to save weight.

Construction data
Name	Namesake	Builder	Laid down	Launched	Entered service
Evstafi (Евстафий)	Saint Eustace	Nikolayev Admiralty Shipyard, Nikolayev	23 November 1904	3 November 1906	28 May 1911
Ioann Zlatoust (Иоанн Златоуст)	Saint John Chrysostom	Sevastopol Shipyard, Sevastopol	13 November 1904	13 May 1906	1 April 1911

== World War I ==
Evstafi, as the newest ship in the Black Sea Fleet, was the flagship of Vice Admiral Andrei Eberhardt for the first year or so of World War I. Two weeks after the Russian declaration of war on the Ottoman Empire on 2 November 1914, the Black Sea Fleet set out to bombard Trebizond on 15 November. The force consisted of the pre-dreadnoughts Evstafi, Ioann Zlatoust, Pantelimon, Rostislav, Tri Sviatitelia and three cruisers escorted by three destroyers and 11 torpedo boats. They did this successfully on the morning of 17 November and then turned west to hunt for Turkish shipping along the Anatolian coast before setting course for Sevastopol later that afternoon. The following day, while en route, the ships were intercepted by the German battlecruiser Goeben and the light cruiser SMS Breslau in what came to be known as the Battle of Cape Sarych.

Despite the noon hour the conditions were foggy and the capital ships initially did not spot each other. The Black Sea Fleet had experimented on concentrating fire from several ships under the control of a "master ship" before the war and Evstafi held her fire until Ioann Zlatoust, the master ship, could see Goeben. When the gunnery commands were finally received they showed a range over 4,000 yards (3,700 m) in excess of Evstafi's own estimate of 7,700 yards (7,000 m), so Evstafi opened fire using her own data before Goeben turned to unmask its broadside. She scored a hit with her first salvo as a 12-inch shell partially penetrated the armor casemate protecting one of Goeben's 15-centimetre (5.9 in) secondary guns. It detonated some of the ready-use ammunition, starting a fire that burnt out the casemate and killed its crew.

Goeben returned fire shortly afterward and hit Evstafi in the middle funnel; the shell detonated after it passed through the funnel and destroyed the antennae for the fire-control radio, which meant that Evstafi could not correct Ioann Zlatoust's inaccurate range data. The other ships either used Ioann Zlatoust's incorrect data or never saw Goeben and failed to register any hits on the German ship. Goeben hit Evstafi four more times, although one shell failed to detonate, before Rear Admiral Wilhelm Souchon decided to turn away and break contact after fourteen minutes of combat. Evstafi suffered 34 killed and 24 wounded from those hits, and only fired between 12 and 16 twelve-inch shells, as well as 14 eight-inch and 19 six-inch shells. Ioann Zlatoust fired only six shells from her main armament.

Several armour plates on Evstafi required replacement after the battle and they were taken from the old pre-dreadnought Dvenadsat Apostolov, allowing the repairs to be complete by 29 November. On 9 January 1915 Breslau and the Ottoman cruiser Hamidiye encountered the Russian fleet while returning from a bombardment mission in the eastern part of the Black Sea. During a minor engagement Breslau hit Evstafi's forward turret, temporarily putting it out of action, after which the two cruisers escaped using their superior speed.

=== Coast bombardment ===
Evstafi and Ioann Zlatoust served as the covering force for several bombardment missions of the Bosphorus between 18 March and 9 May 1915. While the two earlier bombardments were uneventful, the 9 May bombardment provoked a reaction as Goeben intercepted the Russian battleships after they had been spotted by the Ottoman destroyer Nümune-i Hamiyet. Both forces turned on parallel courses and opened fire at the range of 17,400 yards (15,900 m), and although neither side scored a hit, Goeben had multiple near-misses on Evstafi. Admiral Eberhardt then ordered his ships to make only 5 knots (9.3 km/h; 5.8 mph), while Goeben was making 25 knots (46 km/h; 29 mph). Goeben was unable to cross the T of the Russian ships, despite its superior speed, as they were continually turning. This maneuver bought enough time that Tri Sviatitelia and Panteleimon were able to rejoin the other two ships before they could start shelling the Ottoman forts. Panteleimon then hit Goeben twice before the German ship broke contact after 22 minutes of firing. With the fleet assembled Admiral Eberhardt attempted to pursue the German battlecruiser, but was unsuccessful.

Both ships were subsequently fitted with anti-aircraft guns on top of each of their turrets during 1915, and screens were added on top of their funnels to keep out light bombs. Ioann Zlatoust initially received four 75-millimetre guns, but this was later altered to a pair of 75 mm guns and another pair of 63.5-millimetre (2.5 in) guns. Evstafi first received three 75 mm guns, but these were later replaced by two 63.5 mm guns and a pair of 40-millimetre (1.6 in) guns. On 1 August 1915 she, and all the other pre-dreadnoughts, were transferred to the 2nd Battleship Brigade, after the dreadnought Imperatritsa Mariya had entered service. On 1 October the new dreadnought provided cover while Ioann Zlatoust and Pantelimon bombarded Zonguldak and Evstafi shelled the nearby town of Kozlu. Later, both Evstafi-class ships participated in the second bombardment of Varna in May 1916.

Evstafi and Ioann Zlatoust were reduced to reserve in March 1918 in Sevastopol. Immobile, they were captured by the Germans there in May and handed over to the Allies the following December. The British wrecked their engines between 22 and 24 April 1919 when they left the Crimea in order to prevent the advancing Bolsheviks from using them against the White Russians. Later, they were captured by both sides during the Russian Civil War, but were abandoned by the White Russians when they evacuated the Crimea in November 1920. The ships were then scrapped in 1922–1923, although they were not stricken from the navy list until 21 November 1925.
