= Borodino-class battleship =

Russian pre-dreadnought battleship class

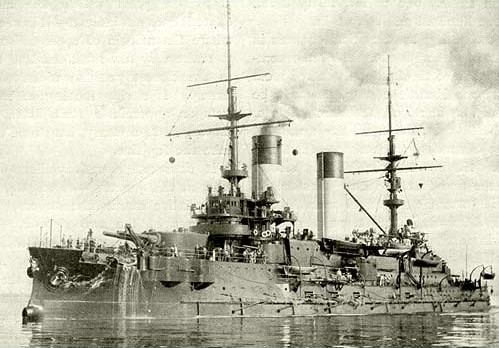
- Oblique view of Oryol at anchor

Class overview
- Builders: Baltic Works, Saint Petersburg (3); New Admiralty Shipyard, Saint Petersburg (1); Galeryni Island Shipyard, Saint Petersburg (1)
- Operators: Imperial Russian Navy; Imperial Japanese Navy
- Preceded by: Tsesarevich
- Succeeded by: Evstafi class
- Built: 1899–1905
- In service: 1904–1922
- In commission: 1904–1922
- Completed: 5
- Lost: 4
- Scrapped: 1

General characteristics
- Type: Pre-dreadnought battleship
- Displacement: 14,091–14,415 long tons (14,317–14,646 t)
- Length: 397 ft (121.0 m)
- Beam: 76 ft 1 in (23.2 m)
- Draft: 29 ft (8.84 m)
- Installed power: 15,800–16,300 ihp (11,782–12,155 kW); 20 Belleville boilers
- Propulsion: 2 shafts, 2 Triple-expansion steam engines
- Speed: 18 knots (33 km/h; 21 mph)
- Range: 2,590 nmi (4,800 km; 2,980 mi) at 10 knots (19 km/h; 12 mph)
- Complement: 28 officers, 826 enlisted men
- Armament: 2 × twin 12 in (305 mm) guns; 6 × twin 6 in (152 mm) guns; 20 × single 75 mm (3 in) guns; 20 × single 47 mm (1.9 in) guns; 4 × single 15 in (381 mm) torpedo tubes
- Armor: Krupp armor; Belt: 7.64–5.7 inches (194–145 mm); Deck: 1–2 inches (25–51 mm); Turrets: 10 inches (254 mm)

The Borodino-class battleships were a group of five pre-dreadnought battleships built for the Imperial Russian Navy around the end of the 19th century. Their design was based on that of the French-built Tsesarevich modified to use Russian equipment. The first four ships were finished after the start of the Russo-Japanese War of 1904–1905 and were among the ships ordered to sail from the Baltic Sea to the Far East to relieve the Pacific Squadron besieged by the Japanese in Port Arthur. Three of these ships were sunk and one was captured by the Imperial Japanese Navy at the Battle of Tsushima in 1905. The fifth and final ship, Slava, was not completed in time to participate in the war and served with the Baltic Fleet through World War I.

== Design and description ==
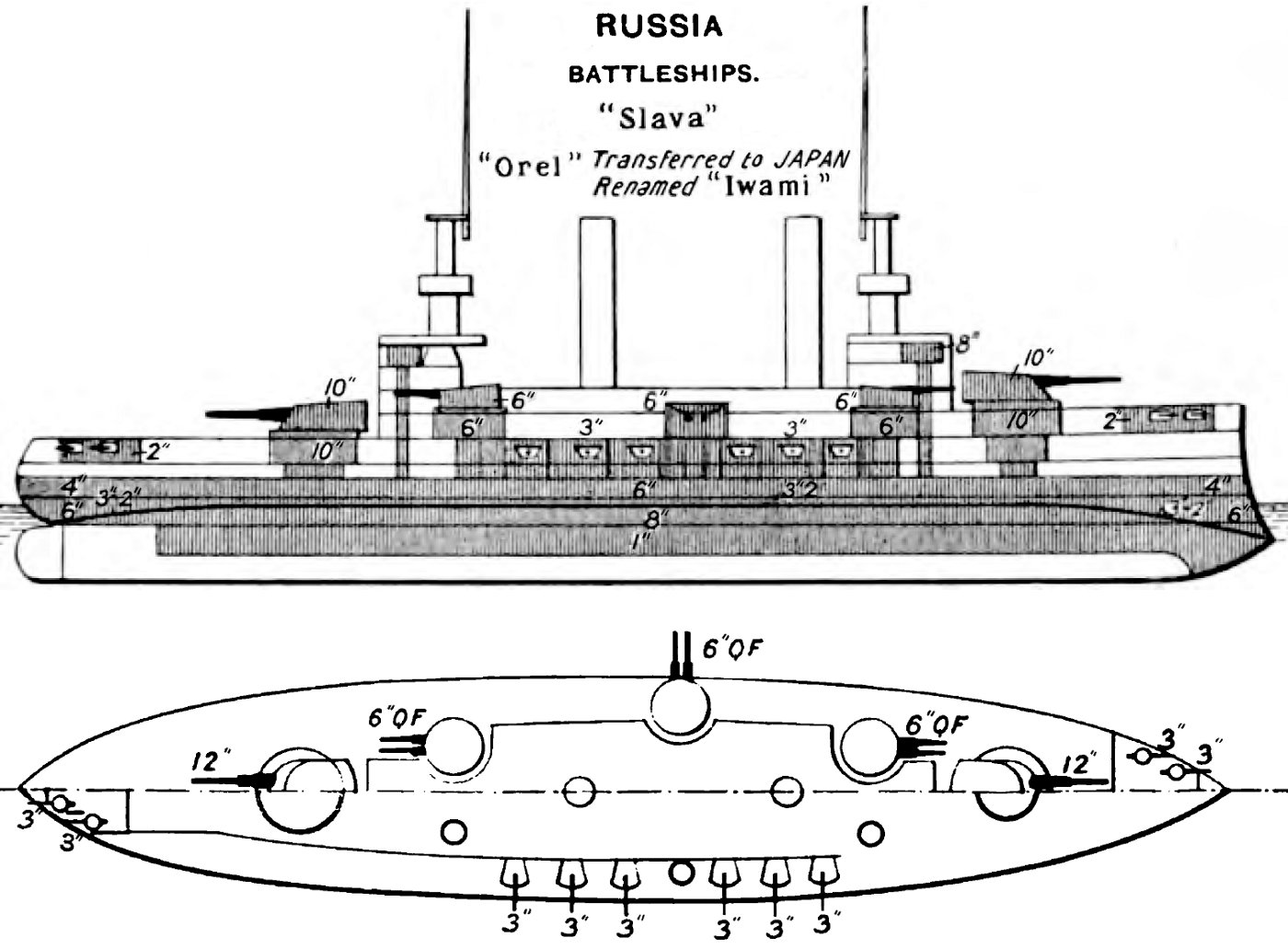
Right elevation and deck plan as depicted in Brassey's Naval Annual 1906

Tsar Nicholas II had desired a warm-water port on the Pacific since his accession to the throne in 1894. He achieved this ambition in March 1898 when Russia signed a 25-year lease for Port Arthur and the Liaotung Peninsula with China. Japan had previously forced China to sign over the port and its surrounding territory as part of the treaty that concluded the First Sino-Japanese War of 1894–1895, but the Triple Intervention of France, Russia, and Germany forced them to return the port in exchange for a sizeable increase in the indemnity paid by the Chinese. Japan invested much of the indemnity money in expanding its fleet, while Russia began a major building programme ("For the Needs of the Far East") to defend its newly acquired port that included the Borodino-class battleships.

The Borodinos were the most numerous class of battleships ever built by Russia. Although they were intended to be near duplicates of Tsesarevich, as soon as the contracts were signed, it became clear that they would be quite different from the French-built ship. The basic problem facing the navy was that the Borodinos would have heavier engines and larger turrets which would require a designer to build a ship which had the same speed, draft, guns and armor as Tsesarevich, but a greater displacement. The new design was drawn up by D. V. Skvortsov of the Naval Technical Committee (NTC). He completed his new design in July/August 1898, one month after the original contract had been signed. The new concept was roughly 1,000 long tons (1,016 t) tons heavier and slightly larger and wider than the Tsesarevich.

As might be expected, the Borodinos greatly resembled Tsesarevich, although Skvortsov added two more casemates, each containing four 75-millimeter (3.0 in) guns, one at the bow and the other aft. These guns were added to the already existing dozen 75 mm guns emplaced along the sides above the armor belt. This caused the tumblehome used on the rest of the hull to be deleted over the twelve guns and flat-sided armor was used in its place. Thus the five Borodino-class battleships had tumblehome hulls only fore and aft of their 75 mm guns emplaced along their sides. The centreline bulkhead between the engine and boiler rooms caused a danger of capsizing if one side flooded and the narrow belt armor became submerged when overloaded. As such, naval historian Antony Preston regarded these as some of the worst battleships ever built.

The ships were 389 feet 5 inches (118.7 m) long at the waterline and 397 feet 3 inches (121.1 m) long overall, with a beam of 76 feet 1 inch (23.2 m) and a draft of 29 feet 2 inches (8.9 m), 38 inches (965 mm) more than designed. Their normal displacement ranged from 14,091 to 14,145 long tons (14,317 to 14,372 t), 500–900 long tons (508–914 t) more than their designed displacement of 13,516 long tons (13,733 t). They were designed for a crew of 28 officers and 754 enlisted men, although Knyaz Suvorov carried 928 crewmen during the Battle of Tsushima.

The Borodino-class ships were powered by two 4-cylinder triple-expansion steam engines, each driving one propeller shaft, using steam generated by 20 Belleville boilers. The engines were designed to reach a top speed of 18 knots (33 km/h; 21 mph). The lead ship, Borodino, was fitted with a copy of the La Seyne machinery installed in Tsesarvich and built by the Franco-Russian Works. The remaining four Borodinos were supplied with machinery designed and built by the Baltic Works. Borodino's engines were rated at 16,300 indicated horsepower (12,200 kW) and its boilers had a working pressure of 19 atm (1,925 kPa; 20 kgf/cm^{2}); the machinery of her sisters was rated at 15,800 ihp (11,800 kW) and their boilers had a working pressure of 21 atm (2,128 kPa; 22 kgf/cm^{2}). Other differences were that Borodino was equipped with economisers for her boilers as well as three-bladed screws, while her sisters lacked economisers and had four-bladed propellers.

Because the ships were being prepared to go to the Far East shortly after completion, they conducted only abbreviated sea trials. Only Oryol reached her designed speed during these trials, despite her engines producing only 14,176 ihp (10,571 kW). The engines of her sisters produced more power, but they were slower during their trials. At deep load they carried 1,350 long tons (1,372 t) of coal that provided them a range of 2,590 nautical miles (4,800 km; 2,980 mi) at a speed of 10 knots (19 km/h; 12 mph). The ships were fitted with six steam-driven generators with a total capacity of 738 kilowatts (990 hp).

=== Armament and fire control ===
The main armament of the Borodino class consisted of two pairs of 40-caliber 12-inch guns mounted in French-style, electrically powered, twin-gun turrets fore and aft. The turrets had a maximum elevation of +15° and 60 rounds per gun were carried. The guns fired one shell every 90–132 seconds. They fired a 731-pound (332 kg) shell at a muzzle velocity of 2,598 ft/s (792 m/s) to a range of 16,010 yards (14,640 m) at maximum elevation.`

The secondary armament of the ships consisted of a dozen 45-caliber Canet Model 1891 6-inch (152 mm) (QF) guns mounted in six electrically powered twin-gun turrets on the upper deck. The turrets had a maximum elevation of +15° arc of fire and the center turrets could cover 180°. Each six-inch gun was provided with 180 rounds. Their rate of fire was about 2–4 rounds per minute. They fired shells that weighed 91 lb (41.4 kg) with a muzzle velocity of 2,600 ft/s (792.5 m/s). They had a maximum range of approximately 12,600 yards (11,500 m).

A number of smaller guns were carried for defense against torpedo boats. These included twenty 50-calibre Canet QF 75-millimetre (3 in) guns mounted in hull embrasures. The ships carried 300 shells for each gun. They fired a 11-pound (4.9 kg) shell at a muzzle velocity of 2,700 ft/s (820 m/s) to a maximum range of 7,005 yards (6,405 m) at an elevation of +13°. The Borodino-class ships also mounted sixteen or eighteen 47-millimetre (1.9 in) Hotchkiss guns in the superstructure. They fired a 2.2-pound (1.00 kg) shell at a muzzle velocity of 1,400 ft/s (430 m/s) at a rate of around 15 rounds per minute.

The ships carried four 381-millimetre (15 in) torpedo tubes, two of which were mounted above water in the bow and stern while the two broadside underwater tubes were located near the forward 12-inch magazine. Four torpedoes were carried for the above-water tubes and six for the submerged tubes. They also carried 50 mines to be laid to protect their anchorage in remote areas.

The Borodino class were originally fitted with Liuzhol stadiametric rangefinders that used the angle between two vertical points on an enemy ship, usually the waterline and the crow's nest, to estimate the range. The gunnery officer consulted his references to get the range and calculated the proper elevation and deflection required to hit the target. He then transmitted his commands via a Geisler electro-mechanical fire-control transmission system to each gun or turret. While fitting out, these rangefinders were replaced on the first four ships by two Barr and Stroud coincidence rangefinders that used two images that had to be superimposed to derive the range. Perepelkin telescopic sights were also installed for their guns, but their crews were not trained in how to use them.

The waterline armor belt of the Borodinos consisted of Krupp armor and was 5.7–7.64 inches (145–194 mm) thick. The armor of their gun turrets had a maximum thickness of 10 in (254 mm) and their deck ranged from 1 to 2 inches (25 to 51 mm) in thickness. The 1.5-inch (38 mm) armored lower deck curved downwards and formed an anti-torpedo bulkhead.

== Ships ==
Construction data
Ship	Namesake	Builder	Cost	Laid down	Launched	Entered service	Fate
Borodino (Бородино)	Battle of Borodino	New Admiralty Shipyard, Saint Petersburg	14.572 million rubles	23 May 1900 (Note: All dates used in this article are New Style.)	8 September 1901	August 1904	Sunk at the Battle of Tsushima, 27 May 1905
Imperator Aleksandr III (Император Александр III)	Tsar Alexander III of Russia	Baltic Works, Saint Petersburg	13.979 million rubles	23 May 1900	3 August 1902	November 1903	Sunk at the Battle of Tsushima, 27 May 1905
Knyaz Suvorov (Князь Суворов)	Alexander Suvorov	Baltic Works, Saint Petersburg	13.841 million rubles	8 September 1901	25 September 1902	September 1904	Sunk at the Battle of Tsushima, 27 May 1905
Oryol (Орёл)	Eagle	Galernyi Island Shipyard, Saint Petersburg	13.404 million rubles	1 June 1900	19 July 1902	October 1904	Surrendered at the Battle of Tsushima, 28 May 1905, renamed Iwami by the Japanese, and scrapped or sunk as target, 1924–1925
Slava (Слава)	Glory	Baltic Works, Saint Petersburg	13.841 million rubles	1 November 1902	29 August 1903	October 1905	Scuttled during the Battle of Moon Sound, 17 October 1917

== Service history ==
On 15 October 1904, Knyaz Suvorov, flagship of Vice Admiral Zinovy Rozhestvensky, commander of the 2nd Pacific Squadron, and the other three Borodino-class battleships set sail for Port Arthur from Libau along with the other vessels of the squadron. Rozhestvensky had received numerous reports of Japanese agents and torpedo boats disguised as fishing vessels before sailing and he ordered maximum alertness after coaling at Skagen, Denmark on 7 October. Early on the evening of the following day, when the squadron was near the Dogger Bank, the auxiliary repair ship Kamchatka reported that she was under attack by torpedo boats in the rain. About four hours later, the squadron encountered British fishing trawlers working the Dogger Bank in the fog and opened fire on them at very short range. One trawler was sunk and at least three others were damaged; several fishermen were killed and others wounded. The battleships also fired upon and damaged the cruisers Aurora and Dmitrii Donskoi in the confusion. The incident enraged the British population and caused a diplomatic incident with the British that nearly led to war until Russia apologized and agreed to pay reparations on 29 October.

Rozhestvensky led his ships down the Atlantic coast of Africa, rounding the Cape of Good Hope, and reached the island of Nosy Be off the north-west coast of Madagascar on 9 January 1905 where they remained for two months while Rozhestvensky finalized his coaling arrangements. During this time, he learned of the capture of Port Arthur and changed his destination to Vladivostok, the only other port controlled by the Russians in the Far East. The squadron sailed for Camranh Bay, French Indochina, on 16 March and reached it almost a month later to await the obsolete ships of the 3rd Pacific Squadron, commanded by Rear Admiral Nikolai Nebogatov. The latter ships reached Camranh Bay on 9 May and the combined force sailed for Vladivostok on 14 May. While exact figures are not available, it is probable that the ships were approximately 1,700 long tons (1,727 t) overweight as they were overloaded with coal and other supplies; all of which was stored high in the ships and reduced their stability. The extra weight also submerged their waterline armor belt and left only about 4 feet 6 inches (1.4 m) of the upper armor belt above the waterline.

=== Battle of Tsushima ===
Before the battle Rozhestvensky grouped the four Borodinos into one division and retained personal command of the division. Oryol, the last ship in the division, fired the first shots of the Battle of Tsushima when the ship's captain, Nikolay Yung, ordered her to open fire at 11:42 at a Japanese cruiser that was shadowing the Russian formation at a range of 9,000 meters (9,800 yd). Rozhestvensky had not given any pre-battle instructions to the fleet covering this situation, but he ordered Yung to cease fire after 30 rounds had been fired without effect. Knyaz Suvorov was the lead ship in the Russian battle line and she opened fire at the Japanese battleship Mikasa, flagship of Admiral Tōgō Heihachirō at 14:05. Mikasa and the other Japanese ships began to return fire about five minutes later. Their high-explosive shells quickly set all four of the Borodinos on fire; at 14:35, Rozhestvensky and the Knyaz Suvorov's captain were wounded by splinters that entered the ship's conning tower. (Note: The overhanging roof of the conning tower deflected splinters from nearby hits into the conning tower.) Around 14:52, another hit jammed Knyaz Suvorov's steering gear after a four point turn to starboard had been ordered and caused the ship to make nearly a full circle before she could be steered by her engines. By this time Knyaz Suvorov's aft 12-inch gun turret had been destroyed by an explosion that blew its roof off onto the quarterdeck, her forward funnel had fallen down and her mainmast had been shot away.

Imperator Aleksandr III and the other ships of the division briefly followed Knyaz Suvorov until it became clear that the latter ship was out of control and then turned north in an effort to get behind Tōgō's ships. Knyaz Suvorov never regained her position in the battle line and became the primary target of the Japanese for a time. Around 16:00 the captain of Imperator Alexandr III, Nikolai Bukhvostov, decided to duplicate Retvizan's maneuver at the Battle of the Yellow Sea by charging straight for the Japanese battleline in an attempt to focus their attention on his ship rather than Knyaz Suvorov. He was successful, but Imperator Aleksandr III was badly damaged in the process. Borodino now assumed the lead position and turned the fleet to the south where they temporarily managed to disengage in the mist and fog.

Knyaz Suvorov was badly damaged by repeated attacks after she separated from the main body although she was initially in no danger of sinking. The Russian destroyer Buinyi came alongside around 17:30 and evacuated Rozhestvensky and other wounded officers. Torpedoes fired by a number of torpedo boats ultimately caused a magazine to explode around 19:20 and Knyaz Suvorov capsized at about 19:30. Other than the 20 officers taken off by Buinyi, there were no survivors of the 928 crew aboard.

When the shooting between the battle lines resumed around 18:00, the Japanese concentrated their fire upon Imperator Aleksandr III and Borodino. Imperator Alexandr III sheered out of line to port around 18:30 and capsized, but did not sink until 19:07; there were no survivors. Borodino lasted a little while longer under concentrated Japanese fire. Two 12-inch hits by the battleship Shikishima at 19:18 started a massive fire and both the ship's 12-inch gun turrets were knocked out. Ten minutes later, after Tōgō ordered his ships to cease fire and disengage, the battleship Fuji fired her already-loaded 12-inch guns before turning away. One of these hit Borodino beneath her starboard forward six-inch turret and ignited the ready-use ammunition in the turret. The fire spread and caused a catastrophic detonation in several magazines that blew open her hull. Borodino quickly capsized and sank with only one crewman from her crew of 855 being rescued.

Oryol took the lead after Borodino was sunk; she was joined by Nebogatov's Second Division after Tōgō ordered the Japanese battleships to disengage in the gathering darkness. Nebogatov assumed command of the remains of the fleet and they continued towards Vladivostok. The ships were discovered by the Japanese early the following morning and attacked by Tōgō's battleships around 10:00. The faster Japanese ships stayed beyond the range at which Nebogatov's ships could effectively reply and he decided to surrender his ships at 10:30 as he could neither return fire nor close the range.

=== Post-Tsushima careers ===
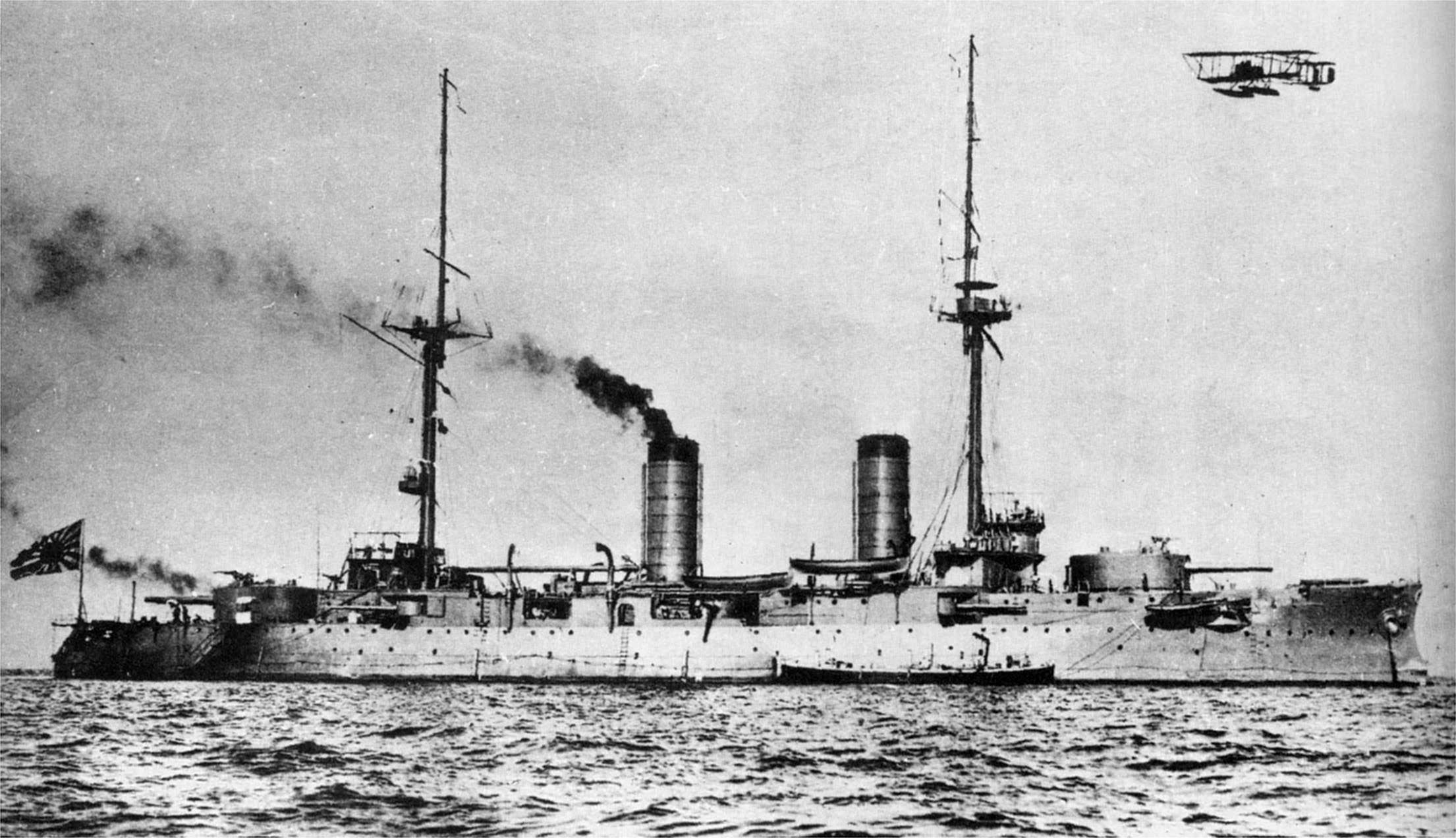
Iwami at anchor

The Japanese substantially rebuilt Oryol and recommissioned her in June 1907 with the name of Iwami. To reduce her top weight, they cut down her superstructure and repositioned her guns. In addition, her boilers were replaced by an unknown number of Japanese-built Miyabara boilers and she was rearmed with Japanese-made guns. These changes reduced her displacement to approximately 13,500 long tons (13,717 t) and her crew now totaled 750 officers and crewmen.

During World War I, the ship participated in the Siege of Tsingtao in August–November 1914 and served as the flagship of the Japanese Intervention Squadron in Vladivostok in 1918 when Japan intervened in the Russian Civil War. She was used as a training ship in 1921 and disarmed in 1922 in accordance with the terms of the Washington Naval Treaty. Sources differ as to her ultimate fate; she was either sunk as a target by aircraft near Miura in July 1924 or scrapped at Kobe in 1924–1925.

Serving in the Baltic Sea during World War I, Slava was the largest ship of the Russian Gulf of Riga Squadron that fought the German High Seas Fleet in the Battle of the Gulf of Riga in August 1915. She was lightly damaged by three hits during the battle. She repeatedly bombarded German positions and troops for the rest of 1915 and during 1916. During the Battle of Moon Sound in 1917, Slava was badly damaged by the German dreadnought SMS König and the flooding significantly increased her draft. The shallow channel made it impossible to escape and she was scuttled in the Moon Sound Strait between the island of Muhu (Moon) and the mainland. The Estonians scrapped her in 1935.
