= Russian 12-inch 40-caliber naval gun =

12-inch 40 caliber naval gun
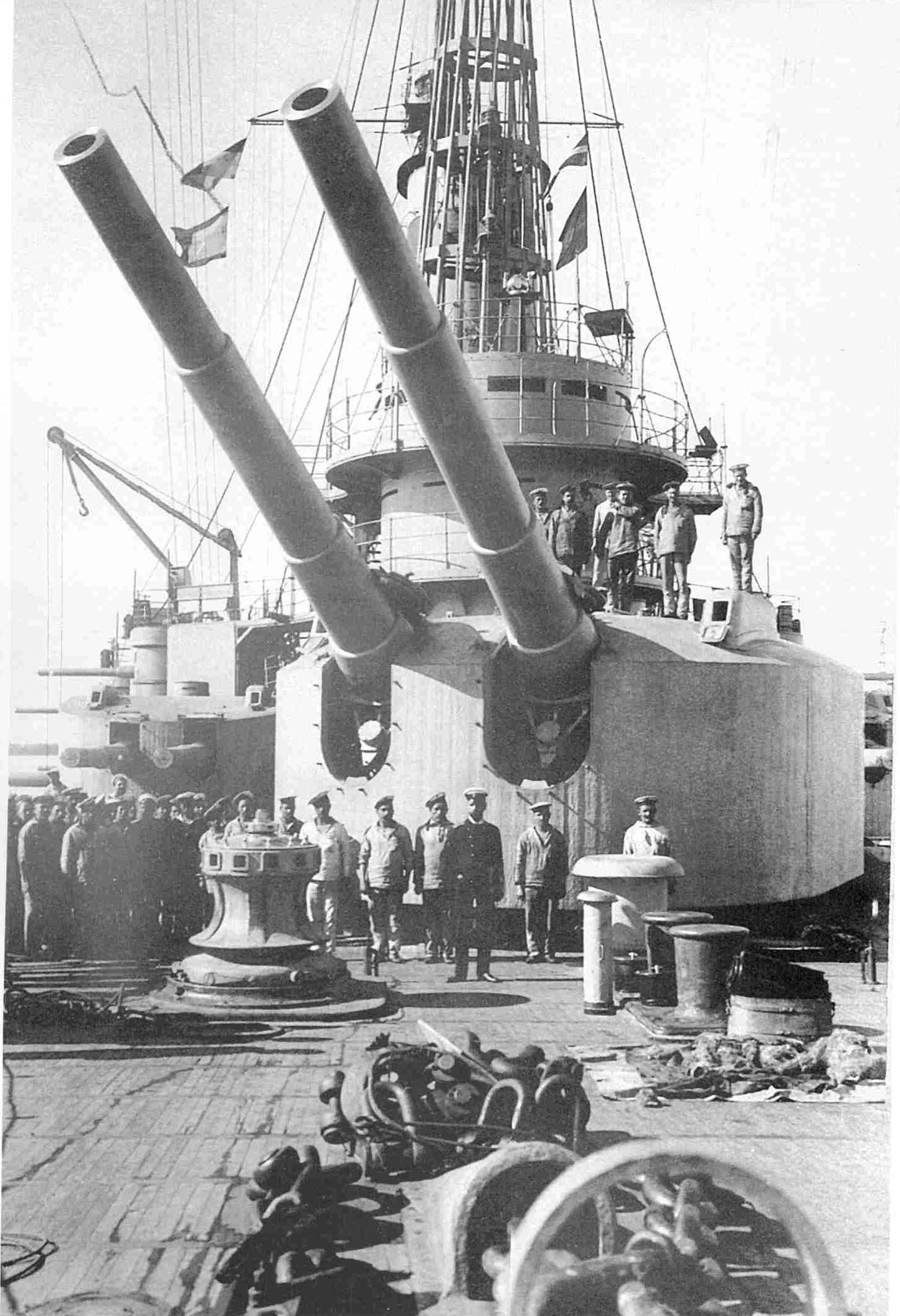
- Fore turret of Andrei Pervozvanny
- Type: Naval gun
- Place of origin: Russian Empire

Service history
- In service: 1896–1916
- Used by: Russian Empire/Soviet Union; Japanese Empire; German Empire; United Kingdom; Romania

Production history
- Designer: Obukhov State Plant
- Designed: 1891–1895
- Manufacturer: Obukhov; United Kingdom
- Produced: 1895–1906, 1914–1917

Specifications
- Mass: 42834 kg (1895–1906); 44250 kg (1914–1917)
- Length: 12.192 m
- Calibre: 12-inch (305 mm)

The 12-inch 40-caliber naval gun was the standard main weapon of the pre-dreadnought battleships of the Imperial Russian Navy. Sixty-eight guns of the first production run were built in 1895–1906 by the Obukhov Works in Saint Petersburg. They were installed on seventeen battleships starting with Sissoi Veliky and Tri Sviatitelia and ending with the Andrei Pervozvanny class. A second production run was ordered to Russian and British gunmakers during World War I.

== History ==
In 1886 the Imperial Russian Navy adopted the 12-inch 35 caliber Krupp gun. The first batch of six German-made guns was installed on Chesma. Local production of the modified Krupp gun began in 1891. Eleven Obukhov guns were installed on Navarin, Chesma and Georgii Pobedonosets. The low firing rate of these guns made them a temporary, intermediate weapon. In the same 1891 the Naval Technical Committee ordered the Obukhov Works to design a new gun with improved range and firing rate, employing smokeless powder. In May 1892 the Navy issued a firm contract for the guns and turrets of Tri Sviatitelia, followed by Sissoi Veliky and the Petropavlovsk class in May 1893. Obukhov presented the first 12-inch 40 caliber gun for trials in March 1895, thus the new gun was also unofficially called Model 1895.

Development of the 12-inch 40-caliber gun coincided with the beginning of the 1892 Franco-Russian Alliance. The Russian Navy abandoned German artillery models in favor of Canet and Schneider et Cie. designs, but the Krupp legacy persisted in the Navy's largest guns. The 12-inch 40-caliber became the Navy's standard main gun and was employed on all its pre-dreadnought battleships starting with Sissoi Veliky of the Baltic Fleet and Tri Sviatitelia of the Black Sea Fleet.

The seventeen battleships employing these guns had turrets of six distinct types. The earliest turrets of Tri Sviatitelia, Sissoi Veliky, Pobeda and Petropavlovsk were powered with hydraulic machinery and their firing rate was on par with the 12-inch 35 caliber guns mounted in electrified turrets. Retvizan became the first battleship with 12-inch 40 caliber guns in electrified turrets. Designers of the Borodino-class battleships increased firing rate to 90 seconds from shot to shot. The range of all these guns was limited by their modest vertical firing angle of 15°. Potemkin, designed to fight the Turkish defenses in The Straits, had its firing angle increased to 35° but required four minutes from shot to shot. The two Andrei Pervozvanny-class battleships, built in 1904–1911, were the last ships to receive the 12-inch 40 caliber guns (in 1907 the Navy adopted the long-range 12-inch 52 caliber guns designed for the Gangut-class dreadnoughts). The turrets of Andrei Pervozvanny allowed firing two broadsides per minute and allowed firing angles of up to 35°. The Navy planned to install similar turrets on the obsolete Chesma but the conversion was canceled.

At the beginning of World War I, the Imperial Navy ordered a second production run of the 12-inch 40-caliber model to replace the worn-out guns of the surviving pre-dreadnoughts. By the end of 1916 thirty new guns, produced at Obukhov Works and in England, were stockpiled in Saint Petersburg, Kronstadt and Sevastopol. The planned refit of the old battleships was interrupted by the 1917 Revolution. In the 1930s these guns were installed in coastal defence batteries and on TM-2-12 railway gun platforms serving in the Far East.

== Operators ==
- Russian Empire/Soviet Union - Main operator, mounted on most Russian pre-dreadnoughts
- Empire of Japan - mounted on ships captured during the Battle of Tsushima
- German Empire - mounted on ships captured at Sevastopol in May 1918
- United Kingdom - mounted on ships captured from the Germans at Sevastopol in December 1918
- Romania - mounted on the Potemkin, briefly interned by Romania in July 1905

== See also ==
Ships armed with the 12-inch 40 caliber guns:

- Tri Sviatitelia
- Sissoi Veliky
- Three Petropavlovsk-class battleships
- Tsesarevich
- Retvizan
- Five Borodino-class battleships
- Potemkin
- Two Evstafi-class battleships
- Two Andrei Pervozvanny-class battleships

=== Weapons of comparable role, performance and era ===
- Armstrong-Whitworth 12-inch 40-calibre naval gun – British and Japanese equivalent
- 305 mm/40 Modèle 1893/1896 – French equivalent
