= 203 mm 50 caliber Pattern 1905 =

Vickers 203 mm 50 caliber Pattern 1905
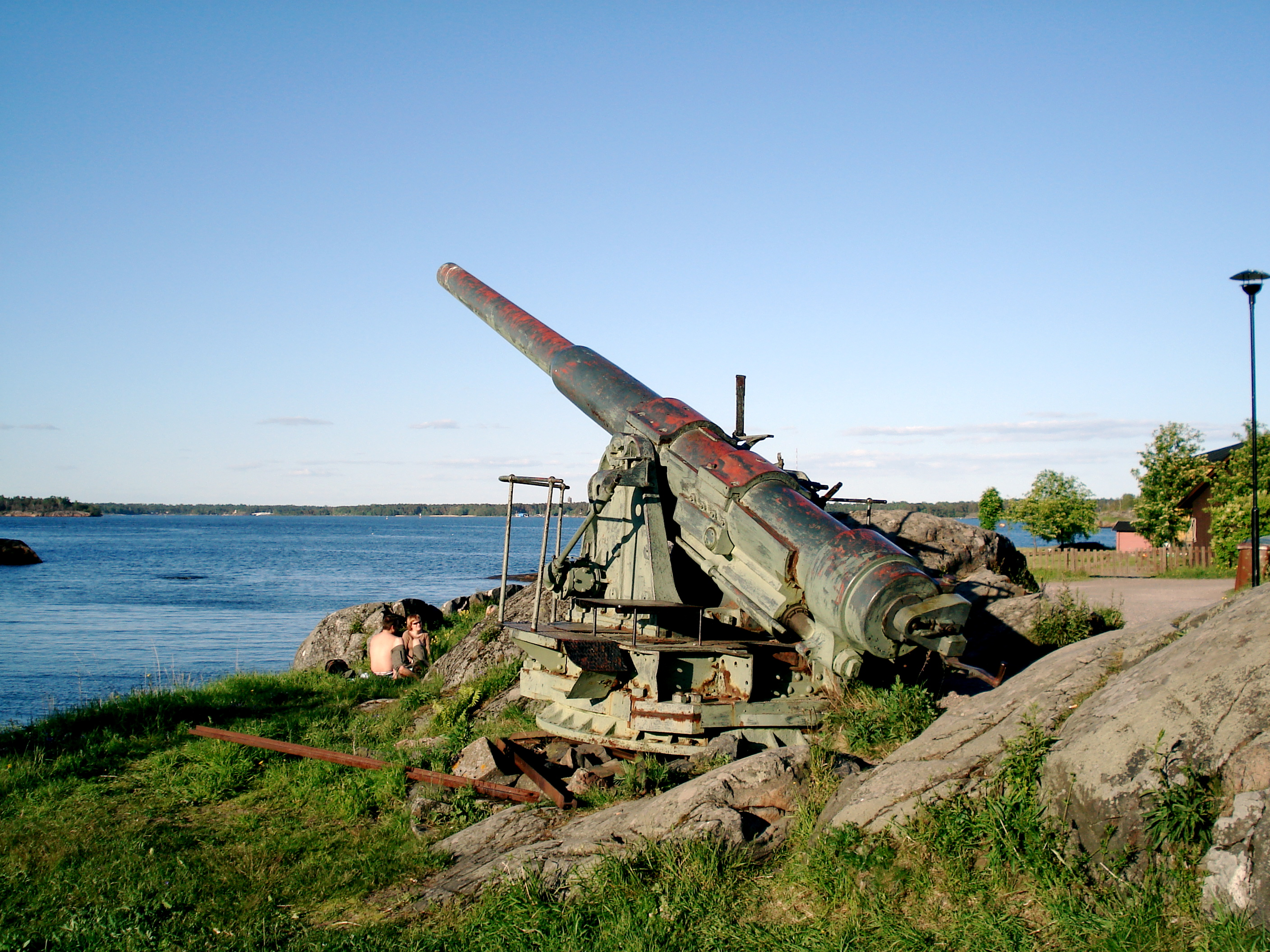
- A Pattern 1905 gun in Suomenlinna fortress, Helsinki. Manufactured by the Obukhov factory in 1909.
- Type: Naval gun Coastal artillery Railway artillery
- Place of origin: Great Britain

Service history
- In service: 1905-1970
- Used by: Russian Empire; Soviet Union; Finland
- Wars: World War I Russian Civil War; Winter War; World War II; Continuation War

Production history
- Designer: Vickers
- Designed: 1905
- Manufacturer: Obukhov State Plant
- Produced: 1905

Specifications
- Mass: 14.4 t (15.9 short tons)
- Length: 10.16 m (33 ft 4 in) 50 caliber
- Barrel length: 9.95 m (32 ft 8 in)
- Shell: Separate loading bagged charge and projectile
- Shell weight: 112–139 kg (247–306 lb)
- Calibre: 203 mm (8.0 in)
- Breech: Welin breech block
- Elevation: Casemates: -5° to +25° Turrets: -5° to +25° Open mounts: -5° to +30°
- Rate of fire: 3-4 rpm
- Muzzle velocity: 792 m/s (2,600 ft/s)
- Maximum firing range: 15.7 km (9.8 mi) at +25°

The 203 mm 50 caliber Pattern 1905 was a Russian naval gun developed by Vickers for export in the years before World War I that armed a variety of warships of the Imperial Russian Navy. Guns salvaged from scrapped ships found a second life as coastal artillery, railway artillery and aboard river monitors during the Russian Civil War. By 1941 it was estimated there were 36 coastal defense guns and two railroad mounts remaining. During the 1930s a number were relined down to 180 mm (7.1 in) and re-designated the 180mm Pattern 1931-1933. These guns were used aboard Kirov-class cruisers or as coastal artillery and railway artillery.

== History ==
The Pattern 1905 began life as a Vickers design for export customers called the Mk B and Mk C. These guns did not serve aboard ships of the Royal Navy because they had standardized on 7.5 in (190 mm) guns. The Pattern 1905 was also produced under license at the Obukhov State Plant in St. Petersburg, Russia.

== Construction ==
The Pattern 1905 was similar in construction to the Vickers 10 in (250 mm) 50 caliber guns produced by Vickers for the Imperial Russian Navy. The Pattern 1905 was a built-up gun which consisted of an A tube, two layers of reinforcing tubes and a Welin breech block. The initial order for eight Vickers Mk B guns served aboard the Russian cruiser Rurik in four twin turrets. Later another thirty-four Mk C guns were ordered from Vickers in 1914. A further nineteen were produced by Obhukov in 1914 to replace worn barrels with only minor differences between the series.

== Naval use ==
The 203mm 50 caliber Pattern 1905 guns armed armored cruisers, river monitors and pre-dreadnought battleships of the Imperial Russian Navy and Soviet Navy built or refit between 1905-1930.

=== Pre-dreadnought battleships ===
- Andrei Pervozvanny-class battleship - The two ships of this class had a secondary armament that consisted of fourteen Pattern 1905 guns. Eight were mounted in four twin-gun turrets at the corners of the superstructure, while six were mounted in casemates in the superstructure.
- Evstafi-class battleship - The two ships of this class had a secondary armament that consisted of four Pattern 1905 guns mounted in the corners of the superstructure in casemates.
- Russian ironclad Petr Veliky - This gunnery training ship had a primary armament of four Pattern 1905 guns in open mounts after a 1907 refit.
- Russian battleship Sinop - This gunnery training ship had a primary armament of four Pattern 1905 guns in turrets after a 1910 refit.

=== Armored cruisers ===
- Russian cruiser Rossia - This ship had a primary armament of six Pattern 1905 guns after a 1915 refit.
- Russian cruiser Rurik - This ship had a secondary armament of eight Pattern 1905 guns in twin turrets at the corners of the superstructure.

== Ammunition ==
Pattern 1905 ammunition consisted of two separate loading bagged charges and a projectile. The projectiles weighed between 112–139 kg (247–306 lb) and the two charges weighed a combined 39 kg (86 lb).

The gun was able to fire:

- High Explosive
- SAP
- Shrapnel

== Photo Gallery ==
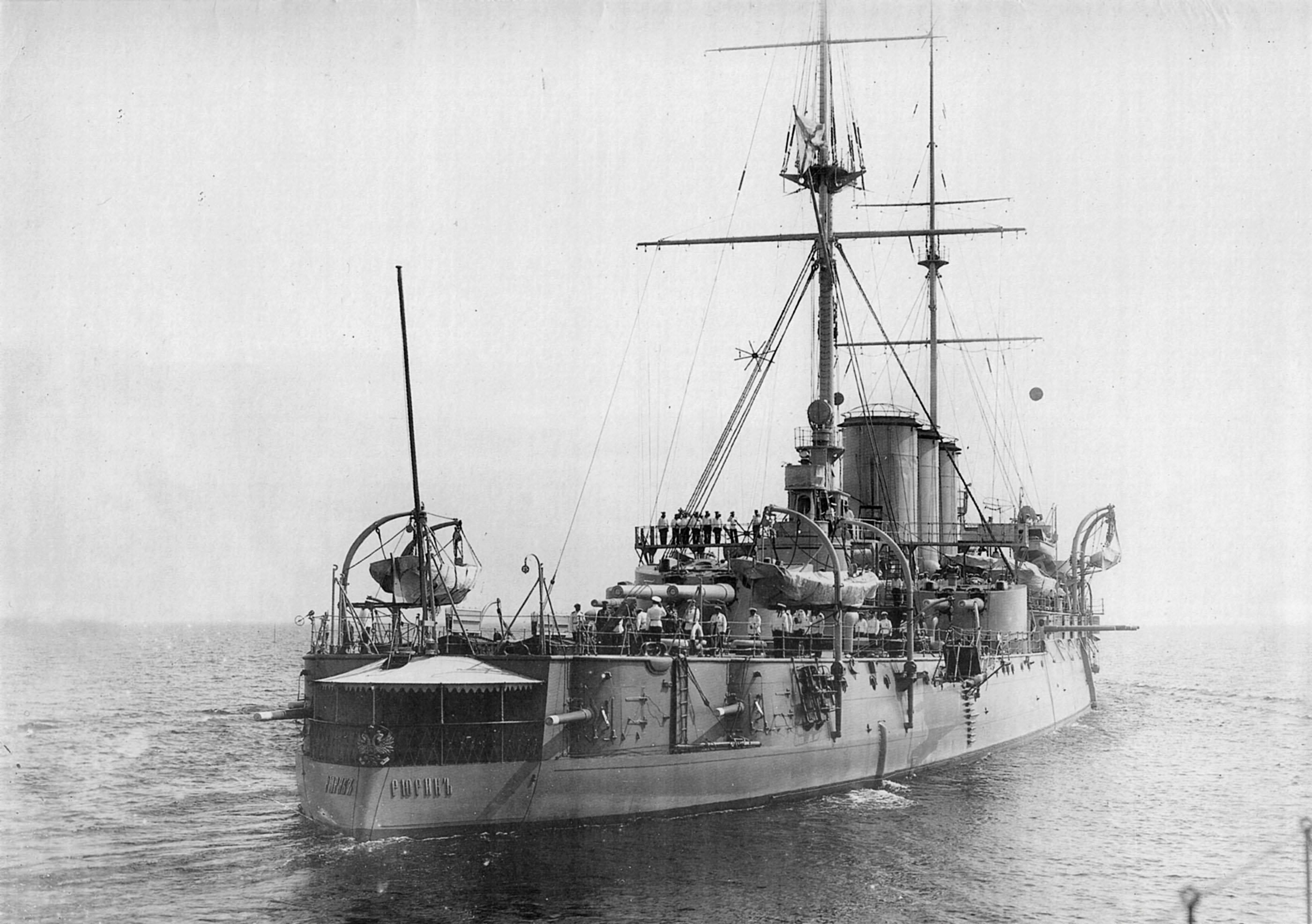
A stern view of the Russian Cruiser Rurik. A twin Pattern 1905 turret can be seen to the right.

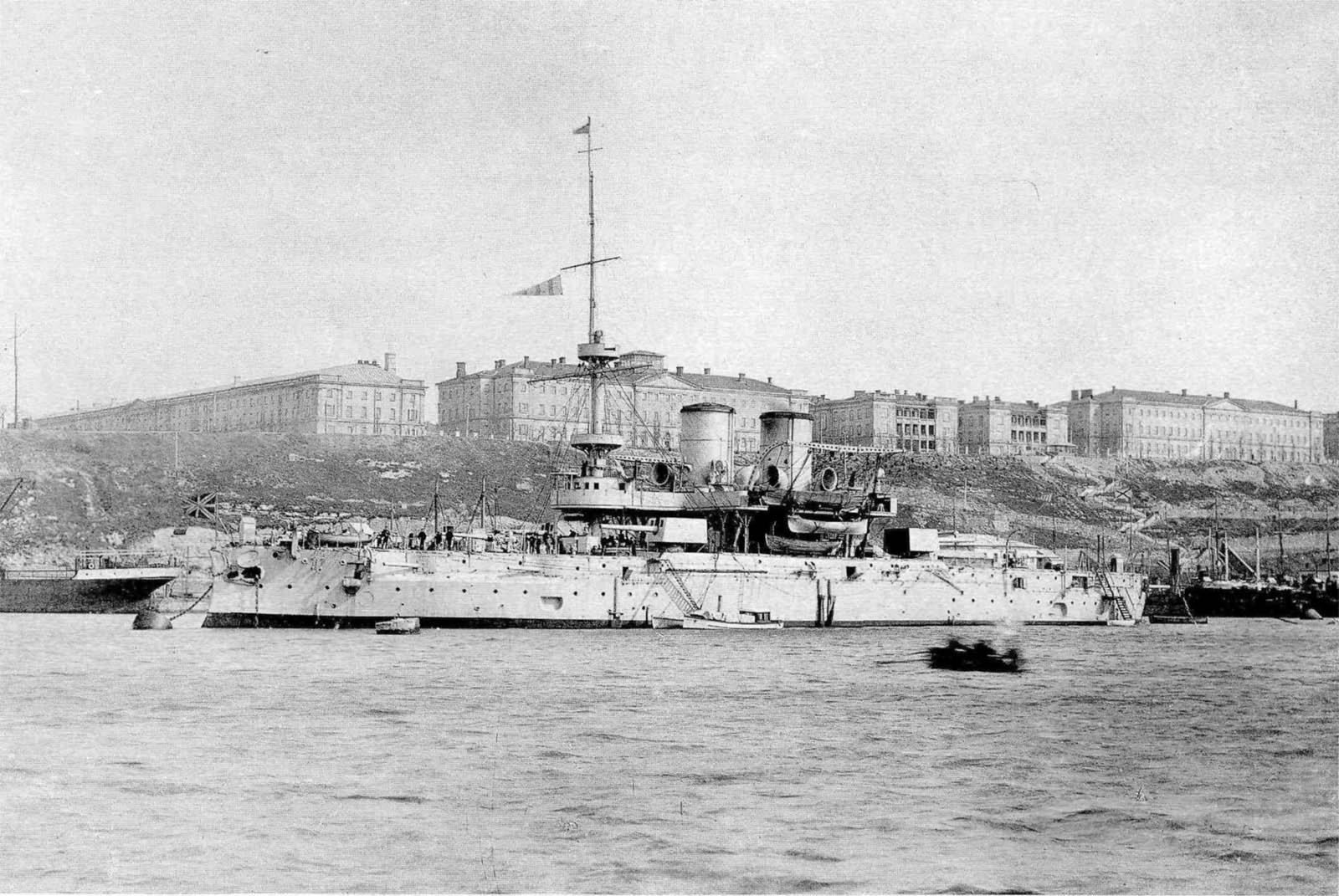
The Russian battleship Sinop with four turret mounted Pattern 1905 guns amidships after a 1910 refit.

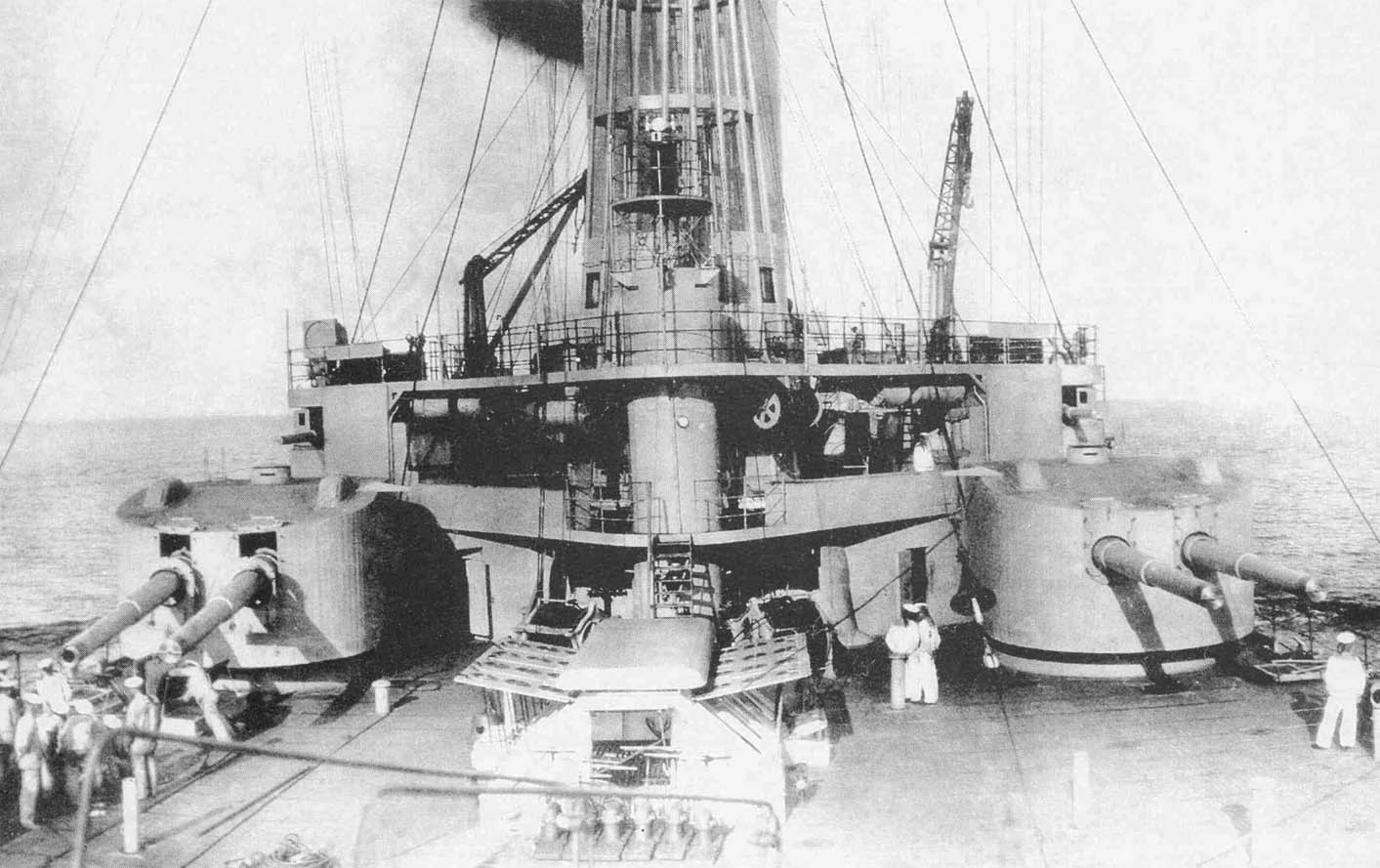
A stern view of the twin Pattern 1905 turrets aboard the Russian battleship Andrei Pervozvannyy.
