= Battle of Cape Sarych =

1914 naval battle in the Black Sea in WWI

- Part of World War I
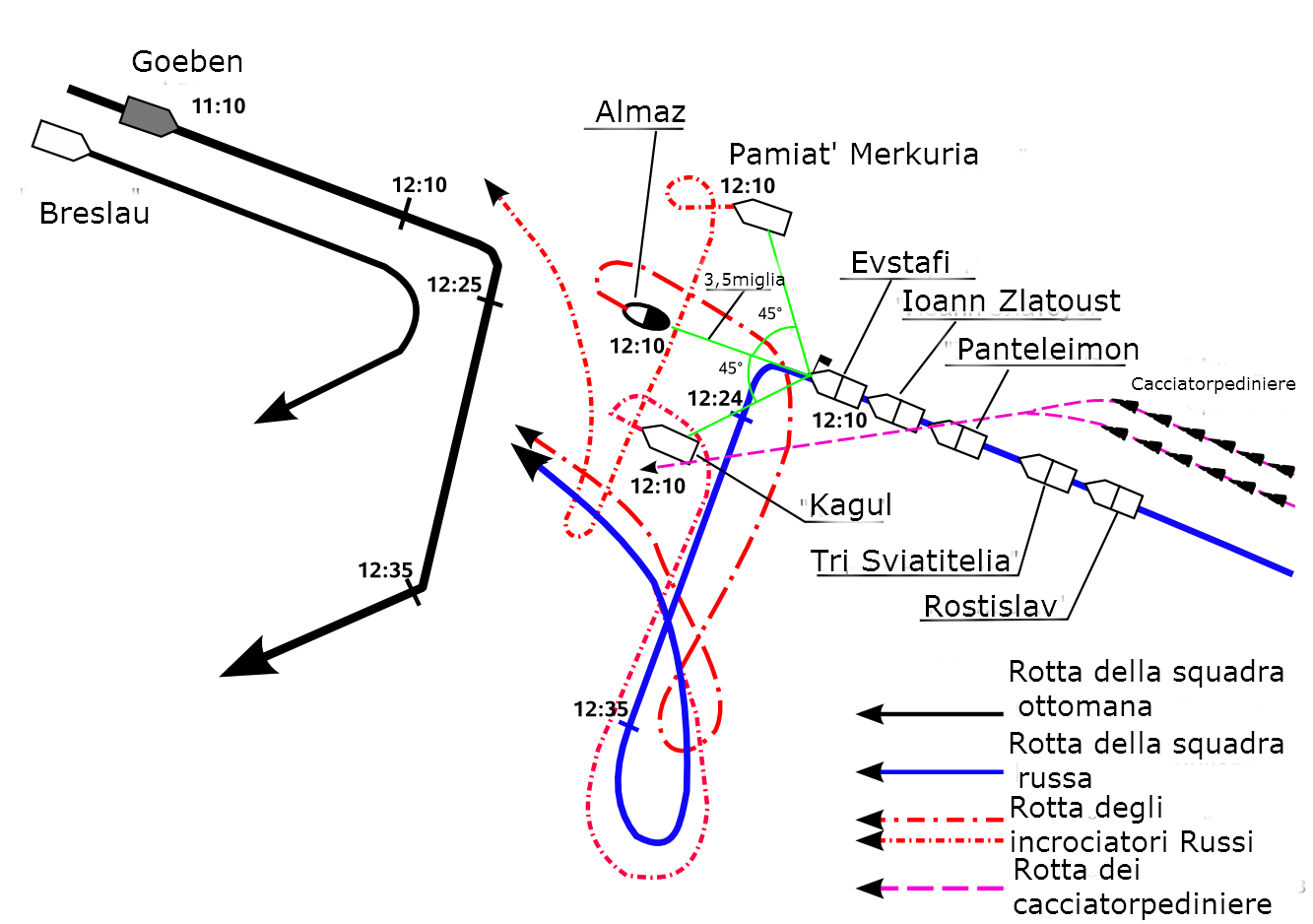
- Map of the battle
| Date | 18 November [O.S. 5 November] 1914 |
| Location | off Cape Sarych, Crimea, Black Sea |
| Result | Russian victory: Turkish battlecruiser retreated |

Belligerents
| Russian Empire | Ottoman Empire |

Commanders and leaders
| (Russian Empire) Andrei Eberhardt | (Ottoman Empire) (German Empire) Wilhelm Souchon |

Strength
| 5 pre-dreadnought battleships | 1 battlecruiser |

Casualties and losses
| 34 killed 24 wounded 1 battleship damaged | 13 to 115 killed 58 wounded (Note: The numbers 115 and 58 were later obtained by Russian intelligence.); 1 battlecruiser damaged |

The Battle of Cape Sarych was a naval engagement fought off the coast of Cape Sarych in the Black Sea during the First World War. In November 1914, two modern Ottoman warships, specifically a light cruiser and a battlecruiser, engaged a Russian fleet including five obsolescent pre-dreadnought battleships in a short action.

== Background ==
On the morning of 17 November 1914, a Russian force consisting of the pre-dreadnought battleships Evstafi (the flagship), Ioann Zlatoust, Panteleimon, Tri Sviatitelya, Rostislav, three cruisers, and 13 destroyers under Vice Admiral Andrei Eberhardt struck the Ottoman port of Trebizond. German Admiral Wilhelm Souchon decided to intercept it as it returned to port. At 13:00 the Ottoman battlecruiser Yavuz Sultan Selim and the light cruiser Midilli sortied from the Bosporus for Sebastopol at high speed. Eberhardt was aware of the Ottomans' departure from port and thus alert for an attack.

The following morning the two Ottoman ships patrolled the Crimean coast in spite of foggy conditions. At 12:05 Midilli sighted a Russian cruiser to starboard. Yavuz turned to face the cruiser at full speed. Other Russian ships were then sighted to the starboard, and soon five pre-dreadnoughts could be identified. Souchon ordered Midilli to keep out of range.

== Battle ==
At 12:20 Evstafi, with a clear view of the Ottomans, opened fire on Yavuz, striking and disabling the third starboard 15 cm (5.9 in) casemated gun with its first salvo. The Russian battleships were using a new form of fire-control system that had been devised in the aftermath of the Russo-Japanese War, with Ioann Zlatoust directing for all other ships except Rostislav, which had a different main armament. The 12-inch shell had passed through the casemate armour and barely penetrated a 150 mm plate before detonating. Splinters badly damaged the ship's torpedo net. It also detonated three 15 cm (5.9 in) high explosive shells and set 16 cartridges on fire. The resulting explosion tore a square meter-sized hole in the side of the ship and killed the gun's crew. The flash fire traveled down the munitions elevator and up into the fourth starboard casemate, which was temporarily abandoned.

At 12:02 Yavuz's first artillery officer could make out the Russian ships through the fog and ordered the crew to target Evstafi. The first salvo overshot the ship, though one shell pierced the center funnel and caused splinter damage to the wireless antennae. The Ottomans' third salvo scored two hits on Evstafi. The first one disabled the forward starboard 6-inch casemated gun and caused casualties among its crew. The second shell penetrated the casemate armour, setting fire to some 6-inch cartridges and detonating in the officers' galley, causing severe damage while some splinters penetrated the deck and went into the boiler room below. A near miss caused extensive splinter damage to an unarmoured part of the ship, destroying a bulkhead in the infirmary.

At 12:24 Yavuz began to lose sight of the Russians and turned away, continuously firing on Evstafi with its aft guns. Outnumbered, Souchon decided to withdraw. The battlecruiser ceased firing at 12:32 and set a course for Cape Sinop.

== Aftermath ==
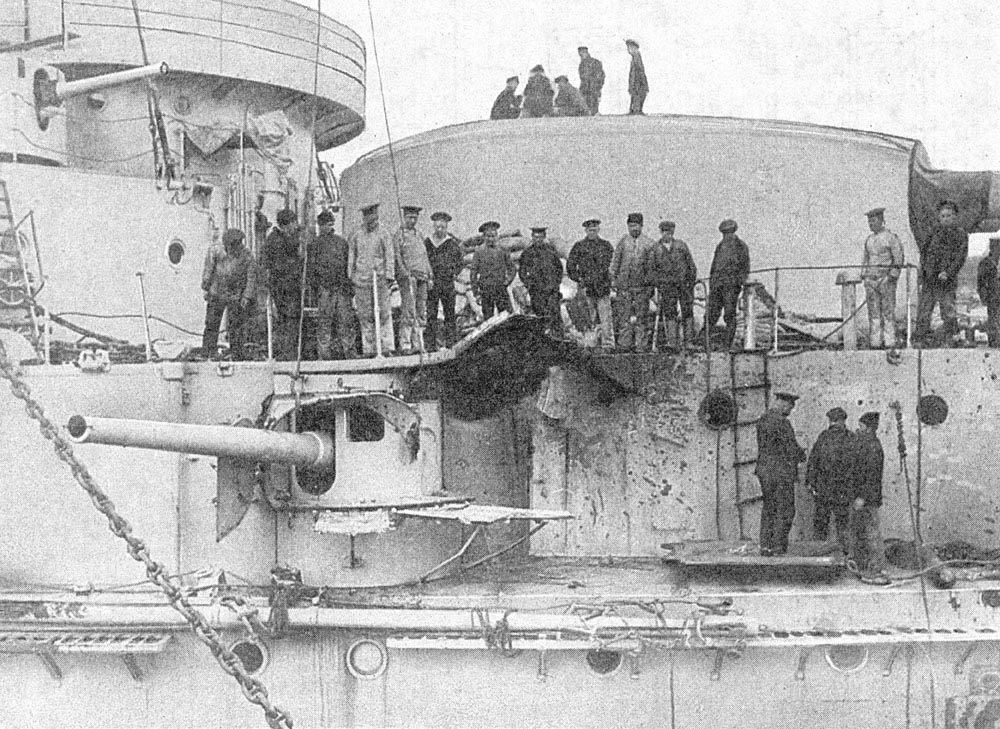
Damage to Evstafi from the battle

Yavuz arrived at Cape Sinop at 8:00 on 19 November. The Ottomans vainly chased five smoke clouds, but failed to make contact with any Russian vessels. At 14:00 on 20 November the battlecruiser returned to the Bosporus. It remained there for the rest of the month.

=== Analyses ===
Evstafi was struck five times during the engagement, suffering 34 killed and 24 wounded. Yavuz had only been struck once, but lost 13 crew (12 Germans and one Turk). As a result of the ammunition detonation near the battlecruiser's 5.9-inch gun, the Ottomans decided to decrease the amount of ready-to-use shells and cartridges in the casemates.

The Russians realised that they would need to keep their pre-dreadnought battleship squadron intact if they were to successfully engage Yavuz, thereby restricting their coastal operations. They also concluded that only a handful of their newest destroyers were suitable for independent operations in the Black Sea, as their cruisers were too obsolete to wield successfully against the Ottoman battlecruiser.
