= Russian battleship Ioann Zlatoust =

Imperial Russian Navy's Evstafi-class battleship

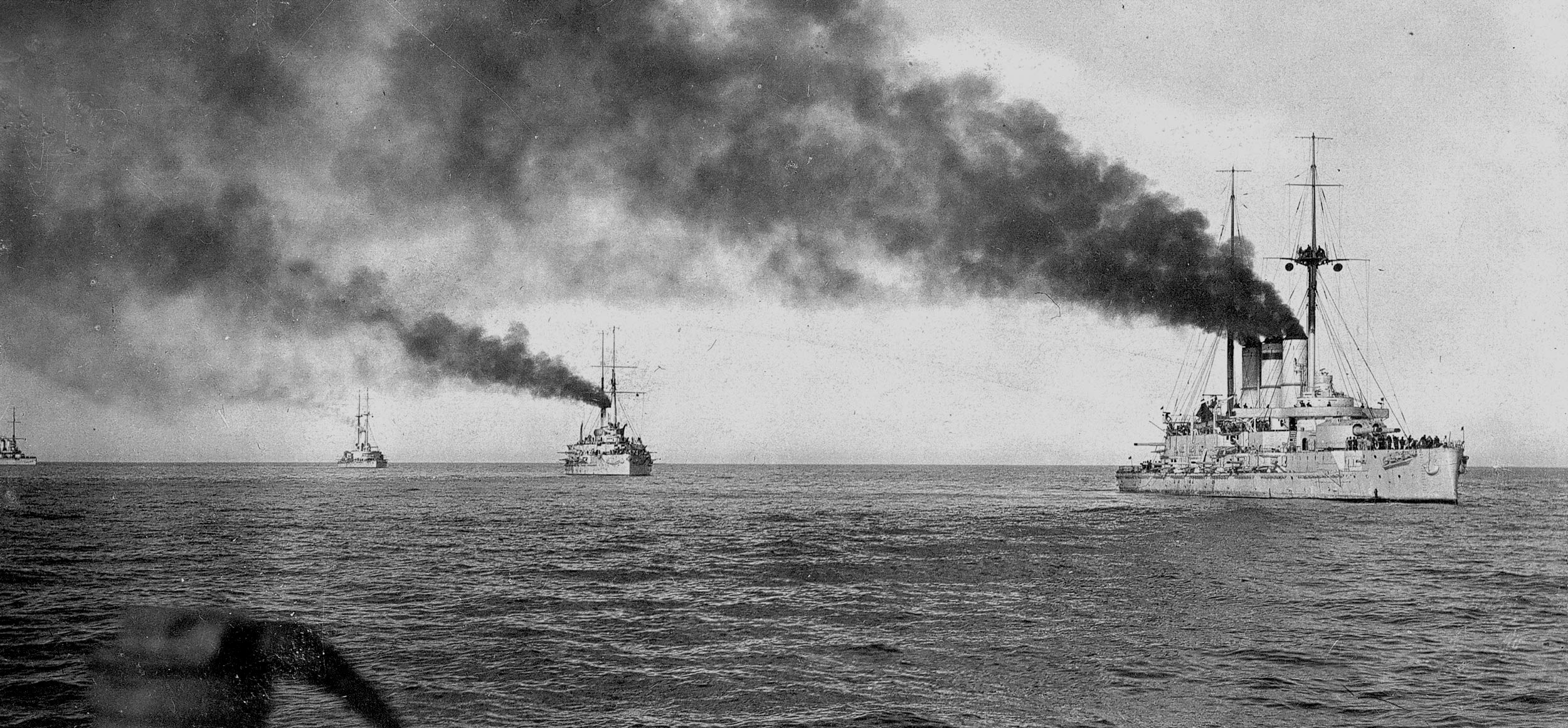
- Ioann Zlatoust leading a column of Black Sea Fleet battleships, 1916

History

Russian Empire
- Name: Ioann Zlatoust
- Namesake: Saint John Chrysostom
- Builder: Sevastopol Shipyard
- Laid down: 13 November 1904 (Note: All dates used in this article are New Style)
- Launched: 13 May 1906
- In service: 1 April 1911
- Out of service: March 1918
- Stricken: 21 November 1925
- Fate: Scrapped, 1922

General characteristics
- Class & type: Evstafi-class pre-dreadnought battleship
- Displacement: 12,855 long tons (13,061 t)
- Length: 385 ft 9 in (117.6 m)
- Beam: 74 ft (22.6 m)
- Draught: 28 ft (8.5 m)
- Installed power: 22 Belleville boilers; 10,600 ihp (7,904 kW)
- Propulsion: 2 shafts; 2 triple-expansion steam engines
- Speed: 16 knots (30 km/h; 18 mph)
- Range: 2,100 nmi (3,900 km; 2,400 mi) at 10 knots (19 km/h; 12 mph)
- Complement: 928
- Armament: 2 × twin 12 in (305 mm) guns; 4 × single 8 in (203 mm) guns; 12 × single 6 in (152 mm) guns; 14 × single 75 mm (3.0 in) guns; 2 × single 17.7 in (450 mm) torpedo tubes
- Armour: Krupp armour; Belt: 7–9 in (178–229 mm); Deck: 1.37–2.75 in (35–70 mm); Turrets: 10 in (254 mm); Barbettes: 10 in (254 mm); Conning tower: 8 in (203 mm); Bulkheads: 7 in (178 mm)

Ioann Zlatoust (Russian: Иоанн Златоуст) was an Evstafi-class pre-dreadnought battleship of the Imperial Russian Navy's Black Sea Fleet. She was built before World War I and her completion was greatly delayed by changes made to reflect the lessons of the Russo-Japanese War of 1905. She was the second ship of her class.

She and her sister ship Evstafi were the most modern ships in the Black Sea Fleet when World War I began and formed the core of the fleet for the first year of the war, before the Imperatritsa Mariya-class dreadnoughts entered service. Ioann Zlatoust and Evstafi forced the German battlecruiser SMS Goeben to disengage during the Battle of Cape Sarych shortly after Russia declared war on the Ottoman Empire in late 1914. She covered several bombardments of the Bosphorus fortifications in early 1915, including one where she was attacked by the Goeben, but Ioann Zlatoust, together with the other Russian pre-dreadnoughts, managed to drive her off. Ioann Zlatoust was relegated to secondary roles after the first dreadnought entered service in late 1915 and reduced to reserve in 1918 in Sevastopol.

Ioann Zlatoust was captured when the Germans took the city in May 1918 and was turned over to the Allies after the Armistice in November 1918. Her engines were destroyed in 1919 by the British when they withdrew from Sevastopol to prevent the advancing Bolsheviks from using the ship against the White guards. She was abandoned when the Whites evacuated the Crimea in 1920 and was scrapped by the Soviets in 1922–23.

== Description ==
Ioann Zlatoust was 379 feet (115.5 m) long at the waterline and 385 feet 9 inches (117.6 m) long overall. She had a beam of 74 feet (22.6 m) and a maximum draft of 28 ft (8.5 m). Her displacement was 12,855 long tons (13,061 t) as completed.

She had two 3-cylinder vertical triple-expansion steam engines driving two propellers. 22 Belleville water-tube boilers provided steam to the engines. The engines had a total designed output of 10,600 indicated horsepower (7,904 kW) and gave a top speed of 16 knots (30 km/h; 18 mph). At full load she carried 1,100 long tons (1,118 t) of coal that provided her a range of 2,100 nautical miles (3,900 km; 2,400 mi) at a speed of 10 knots (19 km/h; 12 mph). Ioann Zlatoust ran her propulsion trials on 26 July 1910 and reached a maximum speed of 16.2 knots (30.0 km/h; 18.6 mph) and her engines produced a total of 10,623 indicated horsepower (7,922 kW). The navy was not satisfied and ran another test on 11 August which revealed cracks in the port engine's medium pressure cylinder. A final test was run on 29 November and the ship's horsepower increased slightly to 10,990 indicated horsepower (8,200 kW).

Ioann Zlatoust's Obukhovskii 12-inch Pattern 1895 40-calibre guns were mounted in two twin-gun turrets, one each fore and aft. Each turret had a firing arc of 260°. All four 8-inch (203 mm) 50-calibre Pattern 1905 guns were mounted in the corners of the superstructure in armoured casemates. These guns had a firing arc of 120° and could fire straight ahead or astern. The dozen 6-inch (152 mm) Canet Pattern 1892 45-calibre guns were mounted in the lower casemates. The anti-torpedo boat armament consisted of 14 75-millimetre (3.0 in) Canet Pattern 1892 50-calibre guns mounted in sponsons on the upper deck, protected by gun shields. She carried two 17.7-inch (450 mm) torpedo tubes on the broadside aft.

=== Wartime modifications ===
Ioann Zlatoust was fitted with anti-aircraft guns on top of each of her turrets during 1915 and screens were added on top of her funnels to keep out light bombs. She was initially received four 75-millimetre guns, but this was later altered to a pair of 75 mm guns and another pair of 63.5-millimetre (2.5 in) guns.

== Service history ==
Construction of Ioann Zlatoust began on 14 November 1903, well before the formal keel-laying ceremony on 13 November 1904. Progress was relatively quick, despite the disruptions caused by the 1905 Revolution, and she was launched on 13 May 1906. Fitting-out, however, was considerably delayed by a number of changes made as the navy digested the lessons of the Russo-Japanese War. For example, there was a period of seven months in 1907 where virtually no work was done on the ship and she was not completed until 1 April 1911. Ioann Zlatoust's turrets had originally been intended for a reconstruction of the elderly pre-dreadnought Chesma, but they were diverted to Ioann Zlatoust after that reconstruction was cancelled.

Before the beginning of World War I the Black Sea Fleet experimented with concentrating fire from several ships under the control of a "master ship". They had to be identically armed and were equipped with additional radio gear to transmit and receive range and deflection data. Ioann Zlatoust became the master ship for the Black Sea Fleet, working with Evstafi and Panteleimon.

Two weeks after the Russian declaration of war on the Ottoman Empire on 2 November 1914, the Black Sea Fleet, comprising the pre-dreadnoughts Evstafi, Ioann Zlatoust, Pantelimon, Rostislav, Tri Sviatitelia, and three cruisers were escorted by three destroyers and 11 torpedo boats set out on 15 November to bombard Trebizond. They did this successfully on the morning of 17 November and they turned west to hunt for Turkish shipping along the Anatolian coast before setting course for Sevastopol later that afternoon. They were intercepted by the German battlecruiser Goeben and the light cruiser SMS Breslau the following day in what came to be known as the Battle of Cape Sarych. Despite the noon hour the conditions were foggy and the capital ships initially did not spot each other. Evstafi was the lead ship, but held her fire until Ioann Zlatoust, the master ship, could see Goeben. When the gunnery commands were finally received they showed a range over 4,000 yards (3,700 m) in excess of Evstafi's own estimate of 7,700 yards (7,000 m), so Evstafi opened fire using her own data before Goeben turned to unmask its broadside. Evstafi scored a hit with her first salvo as a 12-inch shell partially penetrated the armour casemate protecting one of Goeben's 15-centimetre (5.9 in) secondary guns. It detonated some of the ready-use ammunition, starting a fire that burnt out the casemate and killed its crew. That was, however, the only hit on Goeben, although it caused her to disengage from the Russian squadron. Ioann Zlatoust merely fired six shells herself as only her forward turret could see Goeben.

On 9 January 1915 Breslau and the Ottoman cruiser Hamidiye encountered the Russian fleet while returning from a mission in the eastern part of the Black Sea. Breslau hit Evstafi's forward turret, temporarily putting it out of action, and the two cruisers escaped using their superior speed. Evstafi and Ioann Zlatoust served as the covering force for several bombardment missions of the Bosphorus between 18 March and 9 May 1915. The two earlier bombardments were uneventful, but the 9 May bombardment provoked a reaction as Goeben intercepted the Russian battleships after they had been spotted by the Ottoman destroyer Nümune-i Hamiyet. Both forces turned on parallel courses and opened fire at the range of 17,400 yards (15,900 m). Neither side scored a hit although Goeben had multiple near-misses on Evstafi. Vice Admiral Andrei Eberhardt ordered his ships to make only 5 knots (9.3 km/h; 5.8 mph) while Goeben was making 25 knots (46 km/h; 29 mph). Goeben was unable to cross the T of the Russian ships, despite its superior speed, as they were continually turning. This manoeuvre bought enough time that Tri Sviatitelia and Pantelimon were able to rejoin the other two ships before they could start shelling the Ottoman forts. Pantelimon hit Goeben twice before the German ship broke contact after 22 minutes of firing. With the fleet assembled Admiral Eberhardt attempted to pursue the enemy battlecruiser, but was unsuccessful.

On 1 August 1915, Ioann Zlatoust and all the other pre-dreadnoughts were transferred to the 2nd Battleship Brigade, after the dreadnought Imperatritsa Mariya entered service. On 1 October the new dreadnought provided cover while Ioann Zlatoust and Pantelimon bombarded Zonguldak and Evstafi shelled the nearby town of Kozlu. Both Evstafi-class ships participated in the second bombardment of Varna in May 1916.

Evstafi and Ioann Zlatoust were reduced to reserve in March 1918 in Sevastopol. Immobile, they were captured there by the Germans in May 1918 and handed over to the Allies the following December. The British wrecked both ships' engines 22–24 April 1919 when they left the Crimea to prevent the advancing Bolsheviks from using them against the White Russians. They were captured by both sides during the Russian Civil War, but were abandoned by the White Russians when they evacuated the Crimea in November 1920. The ships was scrapped in 1922–23, although they were not struck from the Navy List until 21 November 1925.

== Bibliography ==
- Friedman, Norman (2008). Naval Firepower: Battleship Guns and Gunnery in the Dreadnought Era. Annapolis, Maryland: Naval Institute Press. ISBN 978-1-59114-555-4.
- McLaughlin, Stephen (2001). "Predreadnoughts vs a Dreadnought: The Action off Cape Sarych, 18 November 1914". In Preston, Antony (ed.). Warship 2001–2002. London: Conway Maritime Press. pp. 117–40. ISBN 0-85177-901-8.
- McLaughlin, Stephen (2003). Russian & Soviet Battleships. Annapolis, Maryland: Naval Institute Press. ISBN 1-55750-481-4.
- Nekrasov, George (1992). North of Gallipoli: The Black Sea Fleet at War 1914–1917. East European Monographs. Vol. CCCXLIII. Boulder, Colorado: East European Monographs. ISBN 0-88033-240-9.
