= Imperial Russian Navy =

Navy of Tsarist Russia from 1696 to 1917

- Российский императорский флот
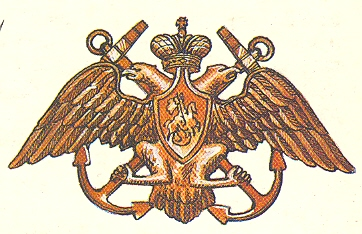
- Emblem of the Imperial Russian Navy
- Founded: 30 October 1696 (Note: Founding of the fleet by the Boyar Duma.)
- Disbanded: 1 September 1917 (Note: Declaration of the Russian Republic.)
- Country: Russia
- Allegiance: Emperor of Russia
- Branch: • Baltic Fleet; • Black Sea Fleet; • Siberian Flotilla; • Arctic Ocean Flotilla; • Caspian Flotilla
- Type: Navy
- Patron: Saint Nicholas the Wonderworker
- Engagements: See list: Russo-Turkish War (1686–1700) Great Northern War Russo-Persian War (1722–1723) Russo-Swedish War (1741–1743) Seven Years' War Russo-Turkish War (1768–1774) Russo-Swedish War (1788–1790) Russo-Turkish War (1787–1792) Napoleonic Wars Russo-Turkish War (1828–1829) Russo-Turkish War (1877–1878) Crimean War Russo-Japanese War World War I

Commanders
- Commander- in-chief: Emperor of Russia
- Minister of the Navy: Nikolai Mordvinov (first); Dmitry Verderevsky (last)
- Notable commanders: See list: Peter the Great Kornely Cruys Fyodor Apraksin Thomas Gordon Aleksei Chirikov Alexei Orlov Grigory Spiridov Samuel Greig Marko Voinovich Vasily Chichagov Fyodor Ushakov Dmitry Senyavin Loggin Heiden Yuri Lisyansky Ivan Krusenstern Faddei Bellingshausen Mikhail Lazarev Pavel Nakhimov Vladimir Kornilov Vladimir Istomin Ferdinand Wrangel Mikhail Tebenkov Fyodor Litke Vasily Zavoyko Gennady Nevelskoy Mikhail Reyneke Nikolay Krabbe Stepan Makarov Ivan Grigorovich Mikhail Bakhirev Vasily Kanin Nikolai von Essen Alexander Kolchak

Insignia
- Ensign

- Jack

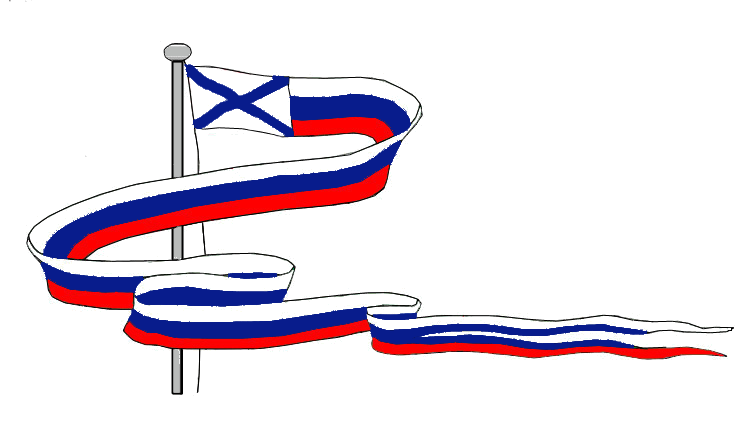
- Pennant

The Imperial Russian Navy (Russian: Российский императорский флот) operated as the navy of the Russian Tsardom and later the Russian Empire from 1696 to 1917. (Note: The Tsardom of Russia declared itself the Empire of Russia (Russian: Российская Империя, romanized: Rossiyskaya Imperiya) in 1721.) Formally established in 1696, it lasted until being dissolved in the wake of the February Revolution and the declaration of the Russian Republic in 1917. It developed from a smaller force that had existed prior to Tsar Peter the Great's founding of the modern Russian navy during the Second Azov campaign in 1696, and expanded in the second half of the 18th century (before the era of the Empress Elizabeth) reaching its peak strength by the early part of the 19th century, behind only the British and French fleets in terms of size.

The Imperial Navy drew its officers from the aristocracy of the Empire, who belonged to the state Russian Orthodox Church. Young aristocrats began to be trained for leadership at a national naval boarding school, the Naval Cadet Corps. From 1818 on, only officers of the Imperial Russian Navy were appointed to the position of Chief Manager of the Russian-American Company, based in Russian America (present-day Alaska) for colonization and fur-trade development. Although the early Imperial Navy initially employed paid foreign sailors, the government began to recruit native-born sailors as conscripts, drafted (as were men to serve in the army). Service in the navy was lifelong before the 1874 decree on conscription limited the service term to six years at most. Many naval commanders and recruits came from Imperial Russia's non-Russian lands with maritime traditions—Finland and (especially) the Baltic governorates.

The Russian Navy went into a period of decline due to the Empire's slow technical and economic development in the first half of the 19th century. It had a revival in the latter part of the century during the reign of Emperor Nicholas II (r. 1894–1917), but most of its Pacific Fleet (along with the Baltic Fleet sent to the Far East) was destroyed in the disastrous Russo-Japanese War of 1904–1905. Nicholas II, who was a naval enthusiast, had a major role in both the build up of the navy before the war with Japan and the rebuilding of it in the decade after.

The navy had mixed experiences during the First World War, with the Germans generally gaining the upper hand in the Baltic Sea, while the Russians took control of the Black Sea. The Russian Baltic Fleet mostly stayed on the defensive, but the Black Sea Fleet's attacks on Ottoman merchant shipping nearly cut off the coal supply to Constantinople and threatened the Ottoman Empire's ability to stay in the war. The Russian Revolution marked the end of the Imperial Navy; the Russian Provisional Government carried out reforms to the navy and its command structure, including the removal of imperial references from its rank insignia. Its officers had mostly aligned with the emperor, and the sailors split to fight on either side during the Russian Civil War of 1917–1922. The Soviet Navy, established as the Red Fleet in 1918 after the Revolution, took over the available surviving ships that did not evacuate from Crimea.

Strategically, the Imperial Russian Navy faced two overarching issues: the use of ice-free ports and open access to the high seas. Saint Petersburg and the other Baltic ports, as well as Vladivostok, could not operate in winter, hence the push for Russia to establish naval facilities on the Black Sea coast and (eventually) at Murmansk. And even substantial naval forces in the Baltic Sea remained confined by the lack of free access to the Atlantic via the Øresund, just as the Black Sea Fleet could not always rely on passage through the Bosphorus and the Dardanelles. As a result, separate naval groupings developed in relative isolation in the Baltic, the Black Sea, the Russian Far East and the Arctic.

== Background ==
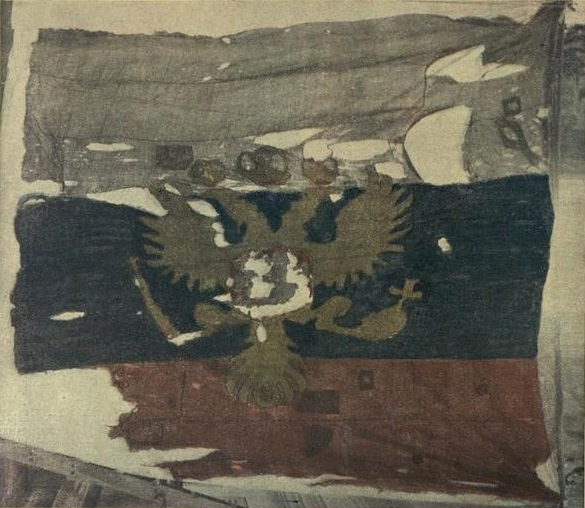
The original "Flag of the Tsar of Moscow" raised in 1693 by Peter the Great on his yacht Saint Peter

Under Tsar Mikhail I (Mikhail Fyodorovich Romanov), the first three-masted ships built within Russia were finished in 1636. Danish shipbuilders from Holstein built it in Balakhna according to contemporary European design. The ship was christened Frederick; during its maiden voyage on the Caspian Sea, the ship sailed into a heavy storm and was lost at sea.

During the Russo–Swedish War, 1656–1658, Russian forces seized the Swedish fortresses of Dünaburg and Kokenhusen on the Western Dvina. They renamed the former as Borisoglebsk and the latter as Tsarevich-Dmitriyev. A boyar named Afanasy Ordin-Nashchokin founded a shipyard at Tsarevich-Dmitriev fortress and began constructing vessels to sail in the Baltic Sea. In 1661, however, Russia lost this and other captured territories by the Peace of Cardis. Russia agreed to surrender to Sweden all captured territories, and it ordered all vessels constructed at Tsarevich-Dmitriev to be destroyed.

Boyar Ordin-Nashchokin turned his attention to the Volga River and Caspian Sea. With the Tsar's approval, the boyar brought Dutch shipbuilding experts to the town of Dedinovo near the confluence of the Oka and Volga rivers. Shipbuilding commenced in the winter of 1667. Within two years, four vessels had been completed: one 22-gun galley, christened Орёл ("Oryol" = "Eagle"), and three smaller ships. Орёл was Russia's first own three-masted, European-designed sailing ship. It was captured in Astrakhan by rebellious Cossacks led by Stepan Razin. The Cossacks ransacked Орёл and abandoned it, half-submerged, in an estuary of the Volga.

During much of the 17th century, independent Russian merchants and Cossacks, using koch boats, sailed across the White Sea, exploring the rivers Lena, Kolyma and Indigirka, and founding settlements in the region of the upper Amur. The most celebrated Russian explorer was Semyon Dezhnev who, in 1648, sailed along the entire northern expanse of present-day Russia by way of the Arctic Ocean. Rounding the Chukotsk Peninsula, Dezhnev passed through the Bering Sea and sailed into the Pacific Ocean.

== Reign of Peter the Great ==
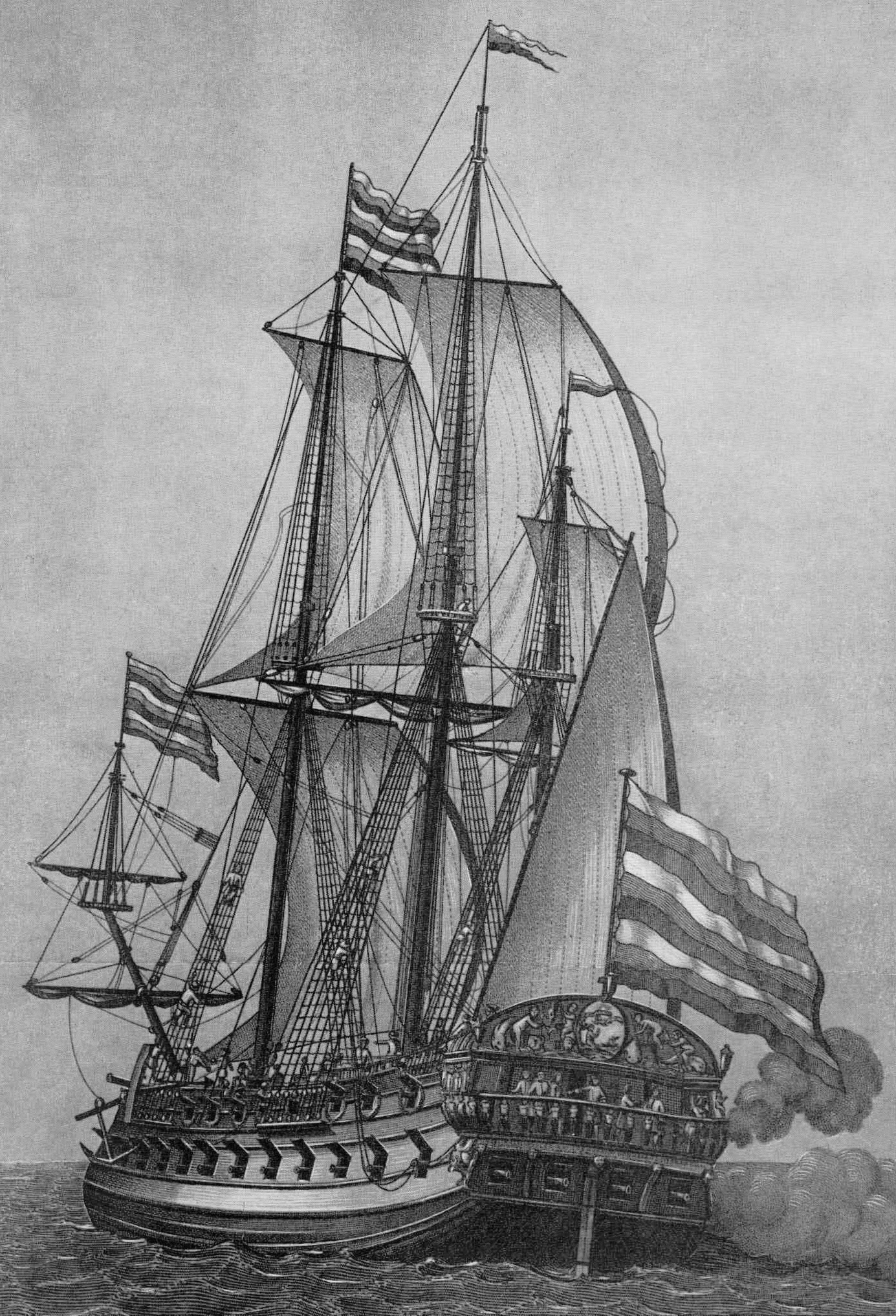
Goto Predestinatsia, flagship of the Azov flotilla until 1711

Peter the Great established the modern Russian Navy. During the Second Azov campaign of 1696 against Turkey, the Russians for the first time used 2 warships, 4 fireships, 23 galleys and 1300 strugs, built on the Voronezh River. After the occupation of the Azov fortress, the Boyar Duma looked into Peter's report of this military campaign. It passed a decree on October 20, 1696, to commence construction of a navy. This date is considered the official founding of the Imperial Russian Navy.

During the Great Northern War of 1700–1721, the Russians built the Baltic Fleet. The construction of the oared fleet (galley fleet) took place in 1702–1704 at several shipyards (estuaries of the rivers Syas, Luga and Olonka). In order to defend the conquered coastline and attack enemy's maritime communications in the Baltic Sea, the Russians created a sailing fleet from ships built in Russia and others imported from abroad.

From 1703 to 1723, the main naval base of the Baltic Fleet was located in Saint Petersburg and then in Kronstadt. Bases were also created in Reval (Tallinn) and in Vyborg after it was ceded by Sweden after Russo-Swedish War (1741–1743). Vladimirsky Prikaz was the first organization in charge of shipbuilding. Later on, these functions were transferred to the Admiralteyskiy Prikaz (admiralty in St. Petersburg).

In 1745 the Russian Navy had 130 sailing vessels, including 36 ships of the line, 9 frigates, 3 shnyavas (шнява — a light two-mast ship used for reconnaissance and messenger services), 5 bombardier ships, and 77 auxiliary vessels. The oared fleet consisted of 396 vessels, including 253 galleys and semi-galleys (called скампавеи, or scampavei; a light high-speed galley) and 143 brigantines. The ships were being constructed at 24 shipyards, including the ones in Voronezh, Kazan, Pereyaslavl, Arkhangelsk, Olonets, Petersburg and Astrakhan.

The naval officers came from dvoryane (noblemen, aristocrats who belonged to the state Russian Orthodox Church). The regular sailors were conscripts, drafted into military service. The service in the navy was lifelong. Children of noblemen were educated for naval service at the School for Mathematical and Navigational Sciences, which had been founded in 1701 in Moscow's Sukharev Tower. Students were often sent abroad for training in foreign fleets. The Navy also hired foreign nationals, with significant naval experience, to serve in the Russian Navy, such as the Norwegian-Dutch Cornelius Cruys, the Greek Ivan Botsis, or the Scotsman Thomas Gordon. In 1718, the Admiralty Board (Адмиралтейств-коллегия) was established as the highest naval authority in Russia.

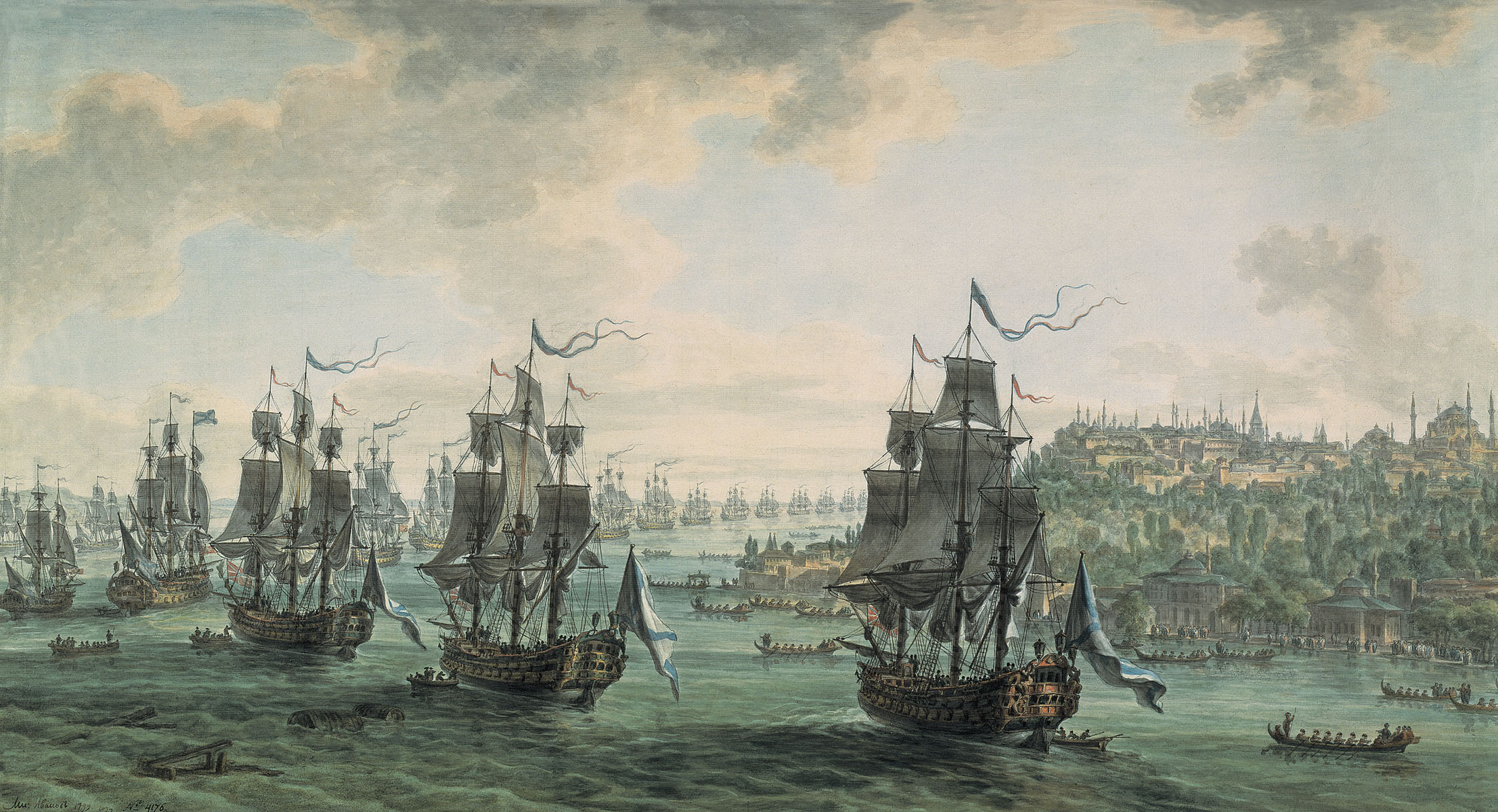
Russian fleet under the command of Admiral Fyodor Ushakov, sailing through the Bosphorus. By M. M. Ivanov

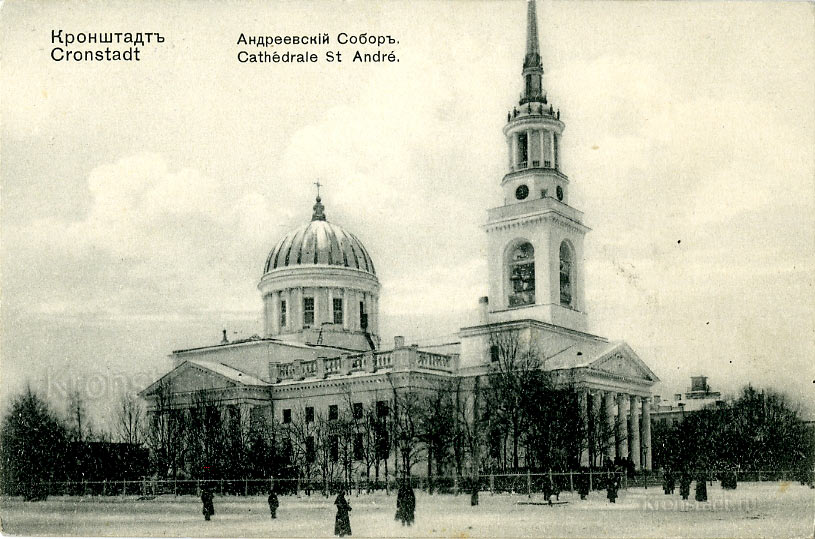
The naval cathedral in Kronstadt was one of several cathedrals of the Imperial Russian Navy.

The organizational principles of the Russian Navy, educational and training methods for preparing future staff, and methods for conducting military action were all summarized in the Naval Charter (1720), written by Peter I himself. Peter the Great, Feodor Apraksin, Alexey Senyavin, Naum Senyavin, Admiral Mikhail Golitsyn and others are generally credited for the development of the Russian art of naval warfare. The main principles of naval warfare were further developed by Grigory Spiridov, Feodor Ushakov, and Dmitry Senyavin.

Between 1688 and 1725, a period spanning most of Peter's reign, some 1,260 seagoing vessels were built in Russian shipyards for the Imperial Russian Navy. Fleets were launched successively on the White Sea, the Sea of Azov (with access to the Black Sea), the Baltic Sea, and the Caspian Sea (Russo-Persian War of 1722–1723). In 1700, the majority of sailors in the Imperial Russian Navy were foreigners at the start of the Great Northern War. But by 1721, at the end of the same war, the navy had 7,215 native-born sailors.

In 1734, during the War of the Polish Succession, the Russian fleet engaged the French Navy for the first time and proved successful in deciding the Siege of Danzig in Russia's favor. The Russian victory ensured that their claimant, August III, ascended to the Polish throne.

== 18th century ==
In the second half of the 18th century, the Russian Navy was built up to support the government's foreign policy. The nation conducted the Russo-Turkish wars for supremacy in the Black Sea. For the first time, Russia sent its squadrons from the Baltic Sea to distant theaters of operations (see Archipelago expeditions of the Russian Navy).

During the Russo-Turkish War of 1768–1774, Admiral Spiridov's squadron sailed from the Baltic to the Mediterranean and gained supremacy in the Aegean Sea by destroying the Turkish fleet in the Battle of Chesma in 1770. While the Russians attempted to foment and support a revolt against the Ottomans in Greece, the Russian fleet was unable to provide sufficient land forces in support and the revolt was crushed.

In 1771, the Russian army conquered the coasts of the Kerch Strait and fortresses of Kerch and Yenikale.

After having advanced to the Danube, the Russians formed the Danube Military Flotilla for the purpose of guarding the Danube estuary. In 1771 they were guests to the Republic of Ragusa. The Beluga caviar from the Danube was famous, and merchants from the Republic of Ragusa dominated the import-export business in Serbia with the Habsburg monarchy.

In 1773 the vessels of the Azov Flotilla (created anew in 1771) sailed into the Black Sea. Russia's defeat of Turkey in the Russo-Turkish War of 1768–1774 allowed it ot gain control of the Sea of Azov and a part of the Black Sea coastline between the rivers Bug and Dniester. The Crimea was pronounced independent under Russia's protectorate and was annexed by Russia in 1783. In 1778, the Russians founded the port of Kherson. The first battleship of the Black Sea Fleet was commissioned here in 1783. A year later, a squadron had been developed.

During the Russo-Turkish War of 1787–1792 Russian control over Crimea was confirmed and Russian naval forces under the command of Admiral Fyodor Ushakov defeated the Turkish fleet at the Battle of Kerch Strait in 1790, preventing the Turks from landing a force in Crimea; while Ushakov's victory at Tendra allowed the Russians to begin the siege of Izmail, a potent Ottoman stronghold by the Black Sea, which was twice besieged without effect.

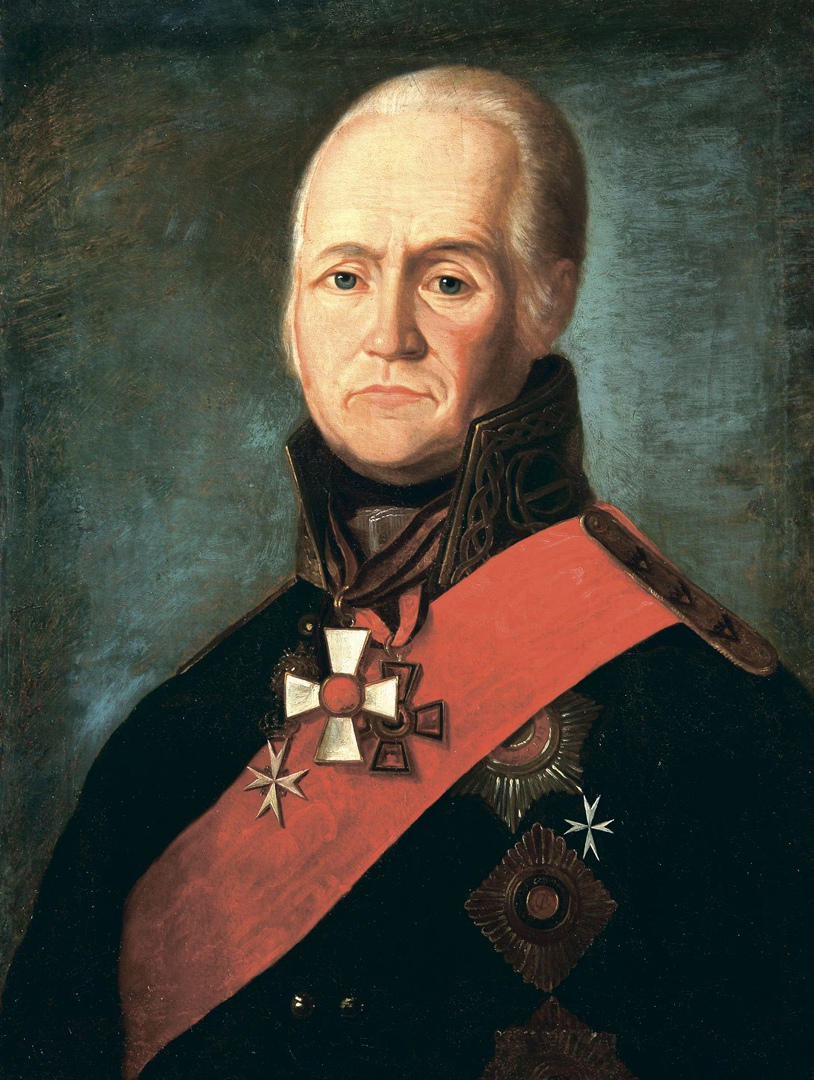
Admiral Fedor Fedorovich Ushakov

With the onset of the French Revolutionary Wars (1792–1802), Russian initially remained neutral. However, during the War of the Second Coalition which began in 1798, a Russian fleet deployed under the command of Admiral Ushakov, coordinated with the Turks, and acted against French forces during the Siege of Corfu. The resulting victory led to the establishment of the Septinsular Republic with the island of Corfu then serving as a base for Russian naval units in the Mediterranean operating against the French until the 1801 Treaty of Paris in which Russia signed a separate peace with France.

== 19th century ==
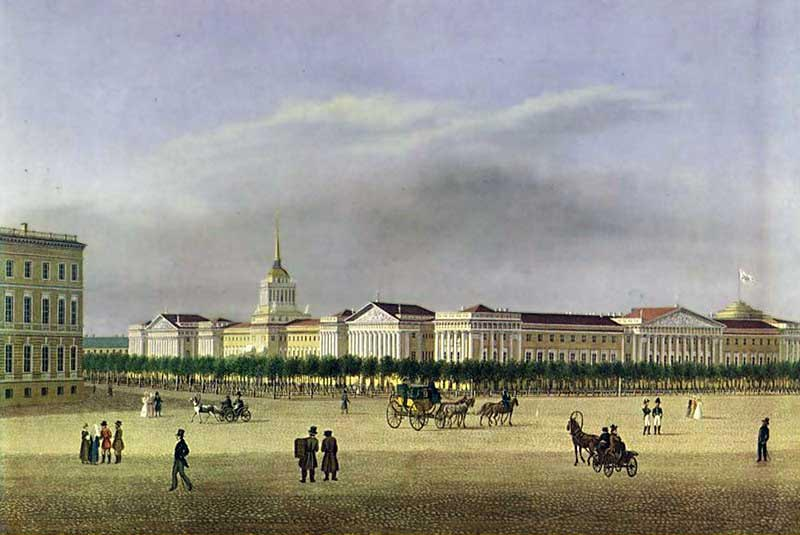
Headquarters of the Admiralty Board, 1810s

By the second half of the 18th century, the Russian Navy had the fourth-largest fleet in the world after Great Britain, France and Spain. The Black Sea Fleet possessed 35 line-of-battle ships and 19 frigates (1787), and the Baltic Fleet had 23 ships of the line and 130 frigates (1788). In the early 19th century, the Russian Navy consisted of the Baltic and Black Sea Fleets, Caspian Flotilla, White Sea Flotilla and Okhotsk Flotilla.

During the Napoleonic Wars, the Russian Navy had limited sea-going capability, with the 1802 Committee to Improve the Condition of the Navy concluding that the dire state of the ships of the Baltic Fleet, suffering as they did from extensive rot and a lack of copper plating, was incapable of defending Kronstadt and St Petersburg. The Committee's chairman, Vorontsov, concluded that "It is impossible for Russia to be considered a major naval power, but there is no predictable need or advantage in this status." Consequently, the Committee recommended nothing more than limited measures to rectify the state of the fleets, and the Russians retained limited capability at sea thereafter, relying on their land power to defeat Napoleon. In 1802, the Ministry of Naval Military Forces was established (renamed to Naval Ministry in 1815).

Turkey and Russia again went to war in the Russo-Turkish War of 1806–1812. The Russian fleet (deploying from the Baltic, but joining some vessels of the Black Sea Fleet already in the Mediterranean prior to the outbreak of war) under the command of Admiral Dmitry Senyavin played an instrumental role in this conflict securing victories at both the Battle of the Dardanelles (1807) and the Battle of Athos (also in 1807). However, after the Peace of Tilsit between Russia and Napoleonic France in 1807 (which ended the War of the Fourth Coalition in which Russia had again been at war with France), the United Kingdom became an enemy and much of the Russian Fleet, under Admiral Seniavin, was interned in Britain with its crews repatriated to Russia. Eight two-decker vessels and two frigates were turned over to the British and laid up. In this condition they gradually deteriorated and only two ships returned to Russia in 1813 after Russia had again become a British ally. A large number of other Russian vessels in the Mediterranean ended up in French hands.

During the French invasion of Russia, the navy assisted in sustaining Russian forces in the city of Riga during its siege by French and Prussian forces from July to December 1812. However, the navy played a limited role thereafter in the War of the Sixth Coalition from 1813-14.

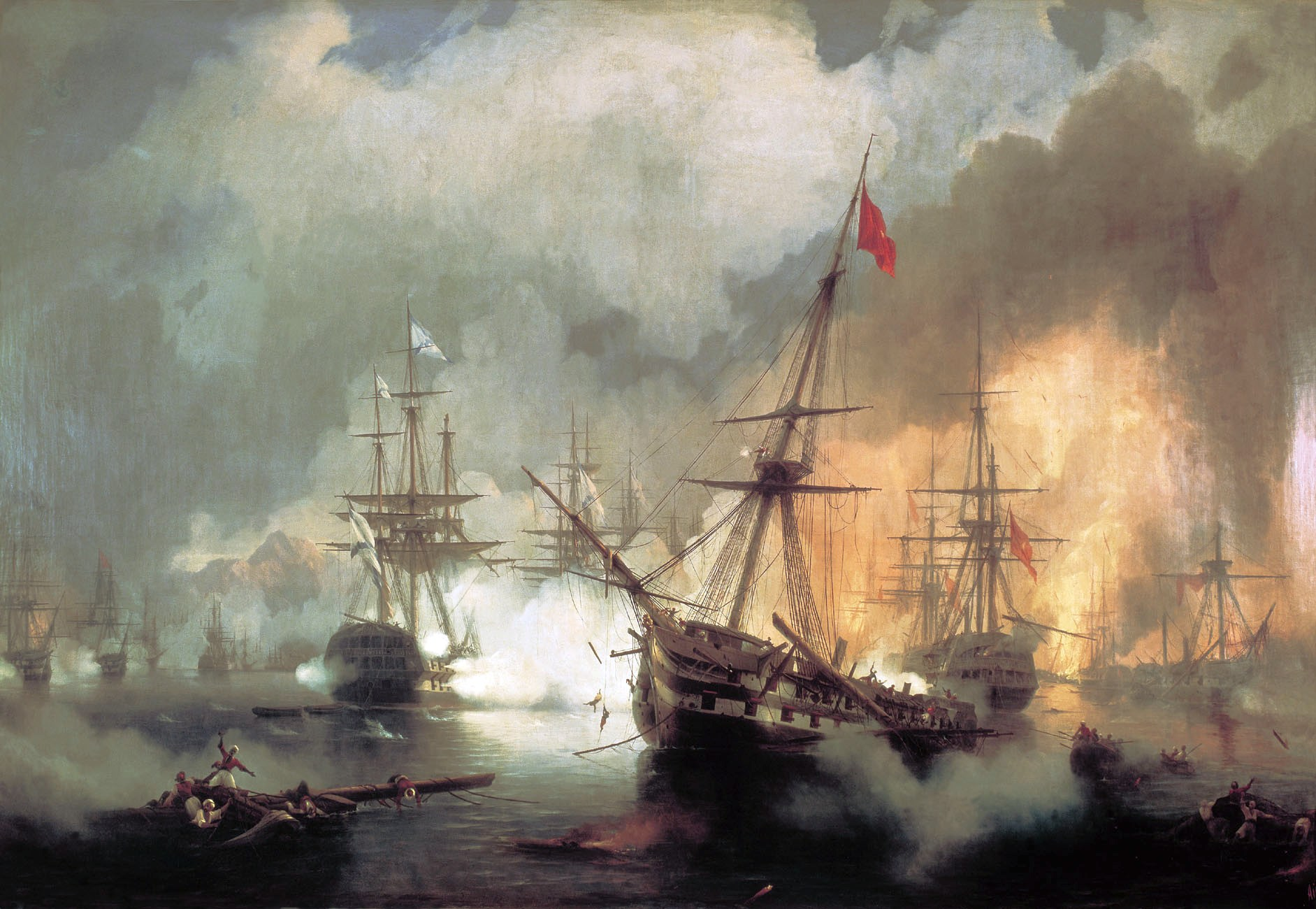
Battle of Navarino, by Ivan Aivazovsky, showing the Russian squadron, in line ahead (left-centre, white flags with blue transversal crosses) bombarding the Ottoman fleet (right, with red flags)

Russian neglect of the navy changed with the accession of Nicholas I in 1825, who less than a month into his reign declared that "Russia must become the third naval power after England and France and must be more powerful than any coalition of secondary naval powers." As a consequence, the 1825 Committee to Organise the Fleet was formed, which outlined an ambitious shipbuilding project which aimed to create the third largest navy in Europe.

The growth of the Russian navy in the years after this greatly bolstered Russian naval capability, expanding both the Baltic and Black Sea Fleets. A Russian squadron under the command of Dutch Admiral Lodewijk van Heiden fought at the Battle of Navarino in 1827. The Navy was used to great effect during the subsequent Russo-Turkish War (1828-29), utilising the Mediterranean squadron and the Black Sea Fleet to gain command of the Sea from the Ottomans, which contributed to Russian victory and the signing of the Treaty of Adrianople in 1829.

In 1826, the Russians built their first armed steamboat Izhora (73.6 kW (98.7 hp)), equipped with eight cannons. In 1836, they constructed the first paddle steam frigate of the Russian Navy called Bogatyr (displacement – 1,340 t (1,320 long tons), power – 177 kW (237 hp), armament – 28 cannons). The Imperial Russian Navy also sent out exploratory expeditions, including to Hawaii with local rulers agreeing to cede rights and territory (including half of Oahu) to Russia. However, the agreements remained unfulfilled due to British opposition. Between 1803 and 1855, their ships undertook more than 40 circumnavigations and long-distant voyages, most of which were in support of their North Americans colonies in Russian America (Alaska) and Fort Ross in northern California, and their Pacific ports on the eastern seaboard of Siberia.

During the American Civil War, Anglo-Russian relations were worsened by Russian perceptions that the British were covertly supporting the January Uprising against Russian rule in Poland. The Russian admiralty feared that its navy could be blockaded by the British and French navies in the case of an outbreak of war, and thus dispatched the Atlantic and Pacific fleets to North America, including San Francisco and from 1863 New York—with sealed orders to attack British naval targets in case war broke out between Russia and Britain. Other analysis suggests that the deployment may have been motivated by a desire to secure shelter for the vessels in case of renewal of conflict with Britain and France.

== Crimean War and aftermath ==
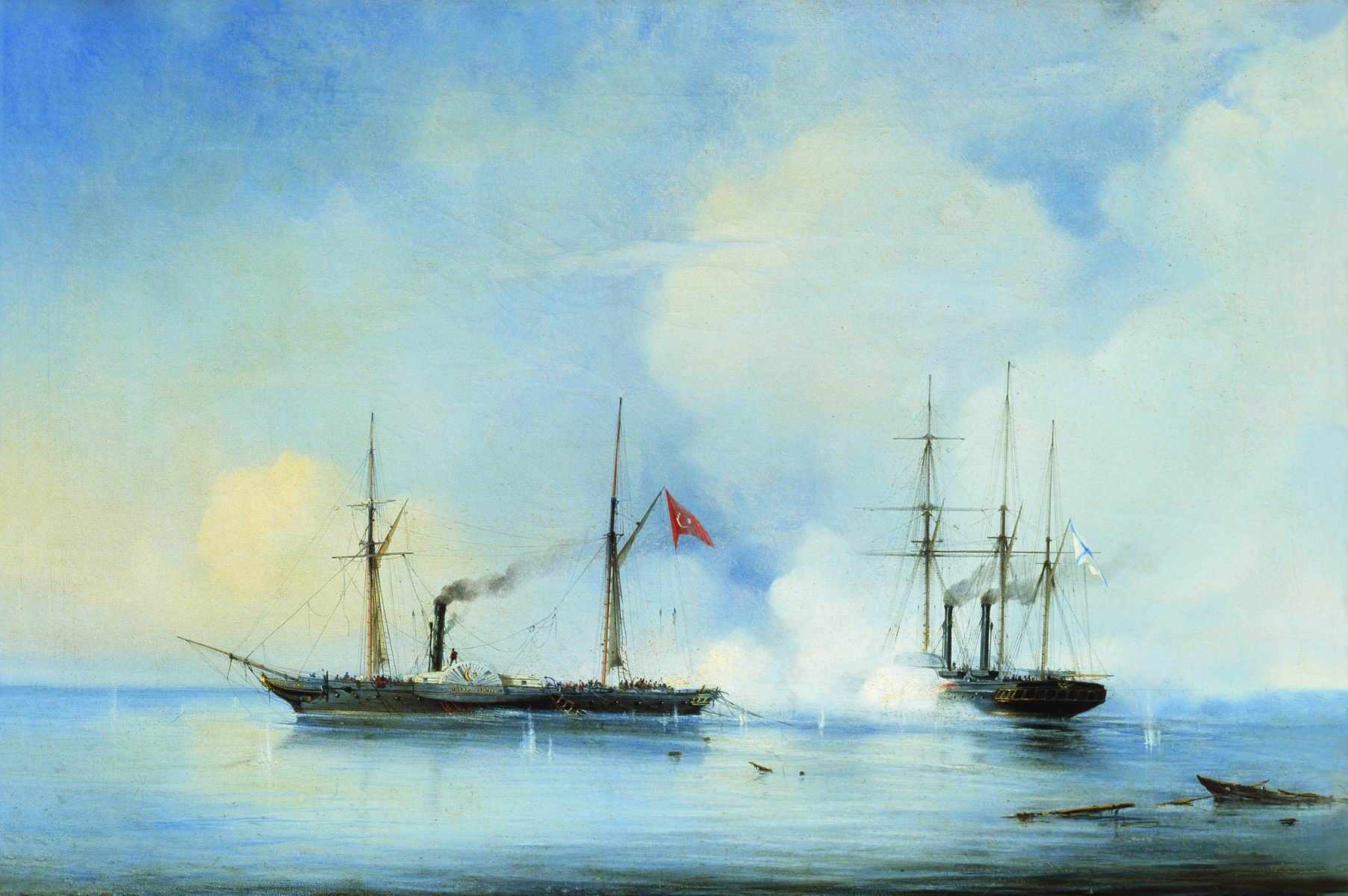
Clash between the Russian steam frigate Vladimir (ship, 1848) and the Turkish steam frigate Pervaz-ı Bahrî on 5 November 1853 – the first naval battle between steam ships in history

Russia's slow technical and economic development in the first half of the 19th century caused her to fall behind other European countries in the field of steamboat construction. By the outbreak of the Crimean War in 1853, Russia had the Baltic and Black Sea Fleets, Arkhangelsk Flotilla, Caspian Flotilla and Okhotsk Flotilla (altogether, 40 battleships, 15 frigates, 24 corvettes and brigs, 16 steam frigates etc.).

The combined number of staff of all the fleets equaled 91,000 people. Despite all this, the reactionary serfdom system had an adverse effect on the development of the Russian Navy. It was especially typical of the Baltic Fleet, which was known for its harsh military drill.

Thanks to admirals Mikhail Lazarev, Pavel Nakhimov, Vladimir Kornilov, and Vladimir Istomin, the sailors of the Black Sea Fleet were taught the art of warfare and upholding of military traditions of the Russian Navy, formed in the times of Admiral Ushakov.

The Battle of Sinop in 1853 the Black Sea Fleet under Nakhimov made a number of tactical innovations. In accordance with the Treaty of Paris, Russia lost the right to have a military fleet in the Black Sea.

In the Pacific, the Okhotsk Military Flotilla was able to assist in defeating a combined Franco-British assault force during the defence of Petropavlovsk in 1854. Although heavily outnumbered, the Russian garrison, supported by the frigate Aurora and the transport vessel Dwina, defeated the Anglo-French force. Despite local military successes, Russia's experience in the Crimean War led it to acknowledge the inherent weaknesses of its position in the Pacific, and in 1867 it consolidated its territorial holdings by selling Alaska to the United States in hopes of offsetting British interests in the Pacific.

In the 1860s, the Russian fleet which had relied upon sails lost its significance and was gradually replaced by steam.

After the Crimean War, Russia commenced construction of steam-powered ironclads, monitors, and floating batteries. These vessels had strong artillery and thick armor, but lacked seaworthiness, speed and long-distance abilities. In 1861, they built the first steel-armored gunboat Opyt (Опыт). In 1869, the Russians began the construction of one of the first seafaring ironclads, Petr Veliky (Пётр Великий).

In 1870 Russia had repudiated the limitations imposed on its navy in the Treaty of Paris. However, when the Russo-Turkish War of 1877–1878 began, Russian naval forces in the region remained weak. According to analysis by Alfred Brainard, during "The lack of an effective Russian navy on the Black Sea dominated the Russian strategy in the Balkans throughout the war". In the aftermath of the conflict, Russia moved to reconstitute its naval strength and fortifications in the Black Sea so as to avoid facing similar vulnerability in the future.

Starting in 1898 with the Russian occupation and lease of Port Arthur in southern Manchuria, Russia took steps to enhance its position in the Far East and strengthen its military and naval forces in the region. Japan came to view Russia's build-up as a threat, and Russia's occupation of Port Arthur itself as an unacceptable humiliation, after having been forced out of the region by Russia, Germany and France in 1895.

The Russian fleet continued to expand in the late 19th century, especially during the reign of Emperor Nicholas II. The Imperial Navy was strongly influenced by the work of the American naval theorist, Alfred Mahan. Given restrictions in the capacity of Russian industry, the country looked to foreign assistance in building its fleet.

During the Boxer Rebellion in 1900, Russian ground and naval forces in the Far East played an important role in the allied campaign to quell anti-Western elements in China. The Russian Navy assisted in capturing the Chinese forts at Taku which blocked the mouth of the Pei-Ho River.

== Russo-Japanese War ==
On the night of 8 February 1904, the Japanese naval fleet under Admiral Heihachiro Togo opened the war with a surprise attack by torpedo boat destroyers on the Russian ships at Port Arthur, badly damaging two Russian battleships. The attacks developed into the Battle of Port Arthur the next morning. A series of indecisive naval engagements followed, in which the Japanese were unable to attack the Russian fleet successfully under shore batteries (coastal guns) of the harbor and the Russians declined to leave the harbor for the open seas, especially after the death of Admiral Stepan Osipovich Makarov on 13 April 1904.

After the attack on Port Arthur, the Japanese attempted to deny the Russians use of the port. On the night of 13/14 February, the Japanese attempted to block the entrance to Port Arthur by sinking several cement-filled steamers in the deep water channel to the port. But the steamers, driven off course by Russian gunfire were unable to be sunk in the designated places, rendering them ineffective. Another attempt to block the harbor entrance on the night of 3/4 May with blockships also failed.

=== Mine-laying ===
In March, the energetic Vice Admiral Stepan Makarov (1849–1904) took command of the First Russian Pacific Squadron with the intention of making plans to break out of the Port Arthur blockade. By then, both sides began a policy of tactical offensive mine-laying by laying mines in each other's ports. This was the first time in warfare that mines were used for offensive purposes. In the past, mines were used as purely defensive purposes by keeping harbors safe from invading warships.

The Japanese mine-laying policy was effective at restricting the Russian movement of its ships outside Port Arthur when on 12 April 1904, two Russian battleships; the flagship, Petropavlovsk, and Pobeda ran into a Japanese minefield off Port Arthur with both striking mines. Petropavlovsk sank within an hour, while Pobeda had to be towed back to Port Arthur for extensive repairs. Makarov died on Petropavlovsk.

However, the Russians soon learned the Japanese tactic of offensive minelaying and decided to play the strategy too. On 15 May, two Japanese battleships – Yashima and Hatsuse, were both lured into a recently laid Russian minefield off Port Arthur, both striking at least two mines. Hatsuse sank within minutes taking 450 sailors with her, while Yashima sank under tow a few hours later.

The Russian fleet attempted to break out from Port Arthur and proceed to Vladivostok, but they were intercepted and dispersed at the Battle of the Yellow Sea. The remnant of the Russian fleet remained in Port Arthur, where the ships were slowly sunk by the artillery of the besieging army. Attempts to relieve the city by land also failed, and after the Battle of Liaoyang in late August, the Russians retreated to Mukden (Shenyang). Port Arthur finally fell on 2 January 1905, after a series of brutal, high-casualty assaults.

=== Russian submarines ===
By 25 June, the Imperial Russian Navy had secretly purchased its first naval submarine, known as Madam, from Isaac Rice's Electric Boat Company. This submarine was originally built under the direction of Arthur Leopold Busch as the American torpedo boat Fulton. It was a prototype of the Holland Type 7 Design known as the Adder-class/Plunger-class submarines. By 10 October, this first Russian submarine was officially commissioned into service and shipped to the eastern coast near Vladivostok Russia and was renamed Som ("Catfish"). This first Russian submarine was not ready in time for the Russo-Japanese War. The reason behind this delay was partly due to a late shipment of torpedoes that was originally ordered from Germany in early 1905. Russia soon ordered more submarines of the same basic design, and they were built under contract with the Holland Company by the Neva Shipbuilding Company located in St. Petersburg, Russia.

In 1903, the German ship building firm Germaniawerft at Kiel completed Germany's first fully functioning engine powered submarine; Forelle. The submarine was toured inspected by Kaiser Wilhelm II, and Prince Heinrich of Prussia was given a brief cruise in the vessel. In April 1904, the Imperial Russian Navy purchased Forelle, and ordered two more submarines of the Karp class. These vessels, as well as Forelle were transported along the Trans-Siberian Railway en route to the war zone.

Germaniawerft, under the supervision of Spanish naval architect Raymondo Lorenzo d'Euevilley-Montjustin, continued his work on the Karp-class submarines, improving and modifying one into Germany's first U-boat, U-1, which was commissioned into the Imperial German Navy on 14 December 1906. U-1 was retired in 1919, and is currently on display at the Deutsches Museum in Munich.

Due to the ongoing blockade of Port Arthur in 1904, the Imperial Russian Navy dispatched their remaining submarines to Vladivostok, and by the end of 1904 the last of seven subs had reached their new base there. Using the seven boats as a foundation, the Imperial Russian Navy created the world's first operational submarine fleet at Vladivostok on 1 January 1905. On 14 February 1905 the new submarine fleet sent out its first combat patrol consisting of the vessels Som and Delfin. With patrols varying from 24 hours to a few days, the sub fleets first enemy contact occurred on 29 April 1905 when Imperial Japanese Navy torpedo boats fired upon Som, withdrawing after failing to score a hit. On 1 July the Russian submarine Keta made contact with two Japanese torpedo boats in the Tartar Strait. Keta could not submerge quick enough to obtain a firing position and both adversaries broke contact.

=== Battle of Tsushima ===
The Russians had already been preparing to reinforce their fleet the previous year by sending elements of the Baltic Sea fleet (The Second Pacific Squadron) under Admiral Zinovy Rozhestvensky around the Cape of Good Hope to Asia, a voyage of over 18,000 mi (16,000 nmi; 29,000 km). On 21 October 1904, while passing by the United Kingdom (an ally of Japan but neutral in this war), they nearly provoked a war in the Dogger Bank incident by firing on British fishing boats that they mistook for Japanese torpedo boats.

The duration of the Baltic Fleet's journey meant that Admiral Togo was well aware of the Baltic Fleet's progress, and he made plans to meet it before it could reach port at Vladivostok. He intercepted them in the Tsushima Strait between Korea and Japan, in the early morning of 27 May 1905. Although both battleship fleets were on nearly equal footing in regards to the latest in battleship technology, with the British warship designs representing the Imperial Japanese Navy, and predominately the French designs being favored by the Russian fleets; it was the combat experience that Togo had accrued in the 1904 naval battles of Port Arthur and the Yellow Sea, that gave him the edge over the un-tested Admiral Rozhestvensky during the Battle of Tsushima on 27 May. By the end of the day on 27 May, nearly all of Rozhestvensky's battleships were sunk, including his flagship, Knyaz Suvorov; and on the following day, Admiral Nebogatov, who had relieved Rozhestvensky due to his wounds, surrendered the remainder of the fleet to Admiral Togo.

== Reconstruction prior to World War I ==
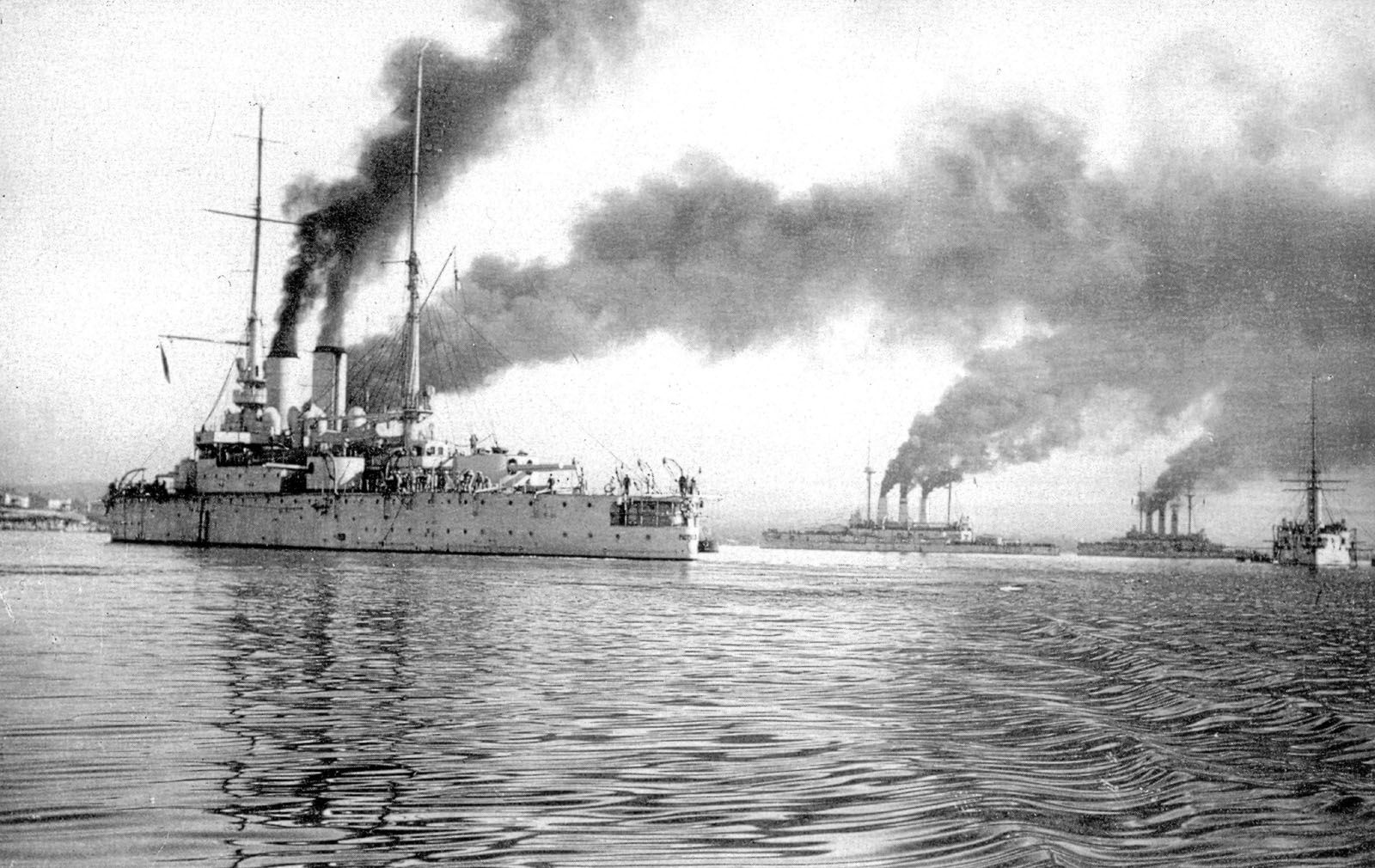
Black Sea Fleet cruisers in Sevastopol, 1910

The defeat at Tsushima in 1905 was the most crushing naval defeat in Russia's history and it would prove to have a lasting impact on the strategy of both the Imperial Navy and of the Soviet Navy that succeeded it. In the short-term, it generated an effort which sought to restore Russia's naval power and to correct the weaknesses that were perceived to have led to it.

Prior to the Russo-Japanese War, the Russian Navy in Far East had suffered from an absence of fleet-wide strategic and operational planning. It had also been deployed in a disjointed and dispersed fashion, thereby contributing to its vulnerability. Aidan Clarke aruges that:

"Of all the weaknesses which the Imperial Russian Navy suffered from during the Russo-Japanese War, none were so glaring as the failings of the officer corps. These officers were generally more concerned with their own advancement rather than success in battle. Tellingly, they suffered from over-bureaucratization and a failure to encourage initiative among their ranks". Discontent in the fleet was high at the end of the war, contributing to mutinies in the Black Sea Fleet most notably on the battleship Potemkin.

In the aftermath of the war, a series of reforms were therefore attempted, including the founding of naval general staff. The task of the naval general staff was approved and defined by Emperor Nicholas II as “the composition of a plan for war at sea and measures for the organization of the combat readiness of the maritime armed forces of the empire.”

At first, attention was directed to creation of mine-laying and a submarine fleet. An ambitious expansion program was put before the Duma in 1907–1908 but was voted down. The Bosnian Crisis of 1909 forced a strategic reconsideration, and new Gangut-class battleships, cruisers, and destroyers were ordered for the Baltic Fleet. A worsening of relations with Turkey meant that new ships including the Imperatritsa Mariya-class battleships were also ordered for the Black Sea Fleet. The total Russian naval expenditure from 1906 to 1913 was $519 million, in fifth place behind Britain, Germany, the United States and France.

The re-armament program included a significant element of foreign participation with several ships (including the cruiser Rurik) and machinery ordered from foreign firms. After the outbreak of World War I, ships and equipment being built in Germany were confiscated. Equipment from Britain was slow in reaching Russia or was diverted to the Western Allies' own war effort.

== World War I ==
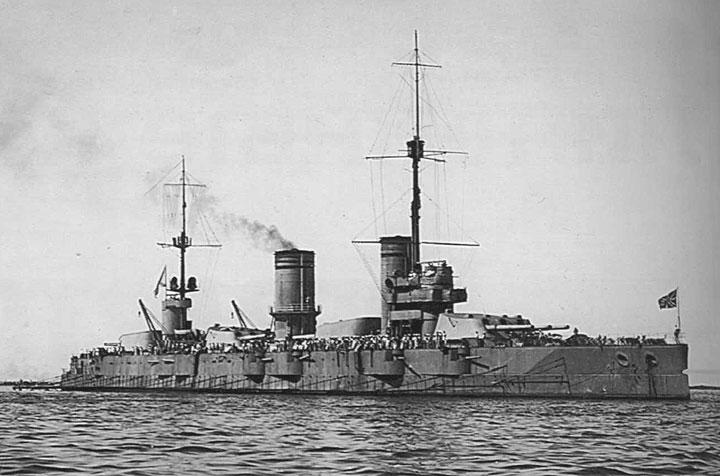
Battleship Sevastopol, which entered the fleet at the end of 1914

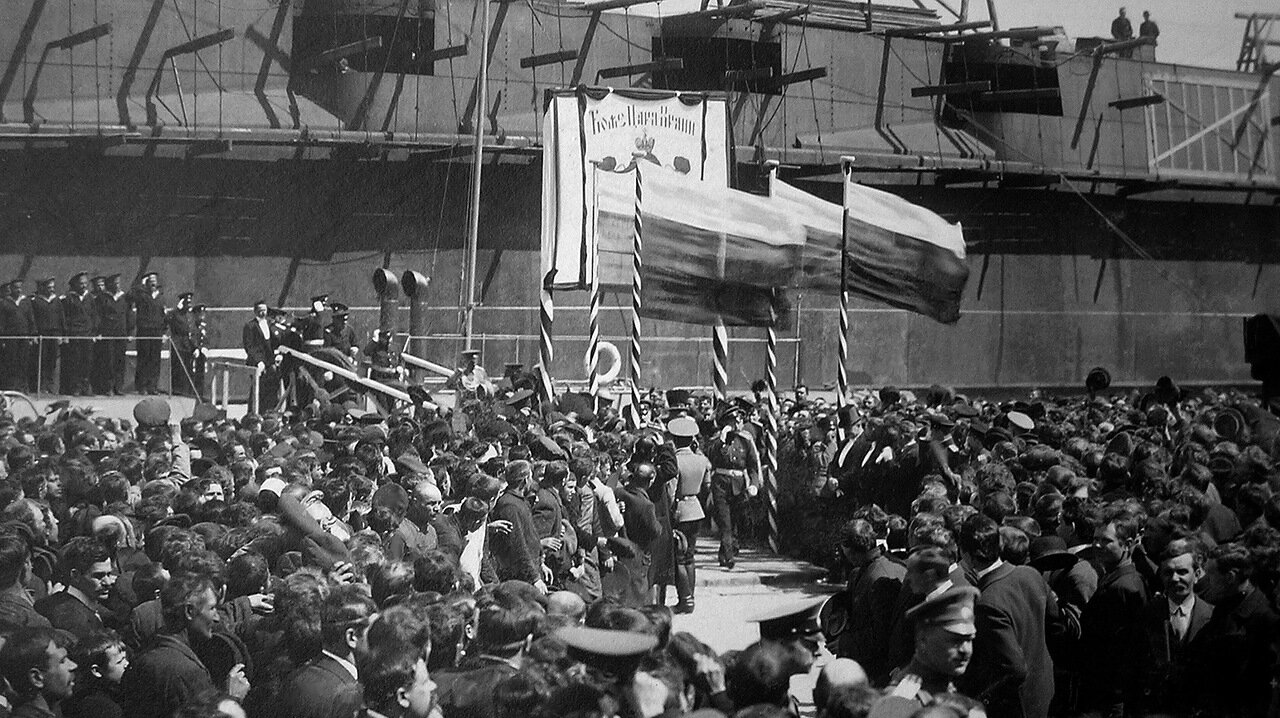
Emperor Nicholas II inspecting the submarine Narval. The battleship Imperator Aleksandr III is in the background

By the time that the war broke out the Russian Baltic Fleet and the Siberian Flotilla were not a match for the German High Seas Fleet or the Imperial Japanese Navy, but the Black Sea Fleet had enough capability to threaten the Ottomans.

At the outbreak of World War I, the Russian Navy consisted of the following:

Ship type	Baltic Fleet	Black Sea Fleet	Siberian Flotilla
Pre-dreadnought battleships	5	5	0
Coastal defense ships	0	1	0
Armored cruisers	6	0	0
Protected cruisers	4	2	2
Destroyers	21	4	17
Torpedo boats	48	24	3
Gunboats	7	5	1
Submarines	15	7	4

By 1917 the Imperial Navy had amassed a fleet of 55 submarines, used to varying degrees of success.

=== Baltic Sea ===
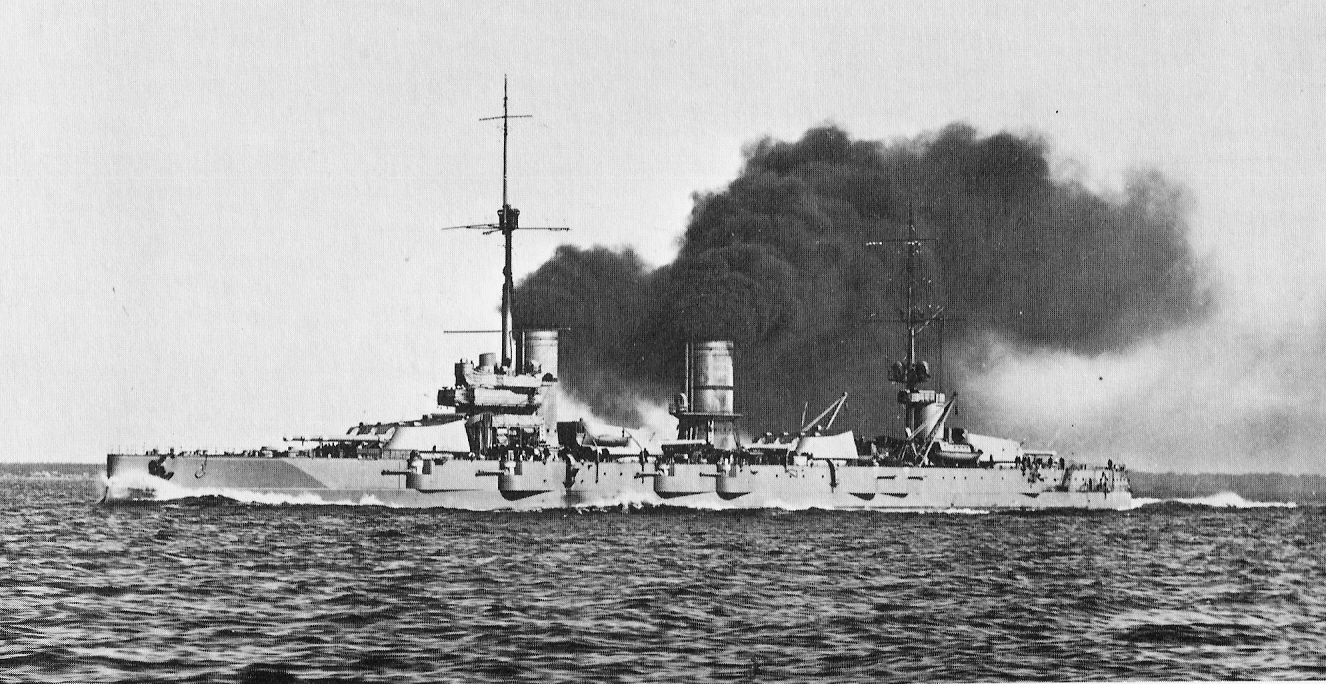
The Baltic Fleet's dreadnought Poltava in 1916

In the Baltic Sea, Germany and Russia were the main combatants, with a number of British submarines sailing through the Kattegat to assist the Russians, including E9 commanded by Max Horton. With the German fleet larger and more modern (many High Seas Fleet ships could easily be deployed to the Baltic via the Kiel Canal when the North Sea was quiet), the Russians played a mainly defensive role, at most attacking convoys between Germany and Sweden and laying offensive minefields. Russian and British submarines attacked German shipping sailing between Sweden and Germany.

With heavy defensive and offensive mining on both sides, fleets played a limited role on the Eastern Front. The Germans mounted major naval attacks on the Gulf of Riga, unsuccessfully in August 1915 and successfully in October 1917, when they occupied the islands in the Gulf (Operation Albion) and damaged Russian ships departing from Riga (Battle of Moon Sound), which had recently been captured by Germany.

By March 1918, the Russian Revolution and the Treaty of Brest-Litovsk made the Germans masters of the Baltic sea and German fleets transferred troops to support newly independent Finland and to occupy much of Russia, halting only when defeated in the West. The Russians evacuated the Baltic fleet from Helsinki and Reval to Kronstadt during the Ice Cruise of the Baltic Fleet in March 1918.

=== Black Sea ===
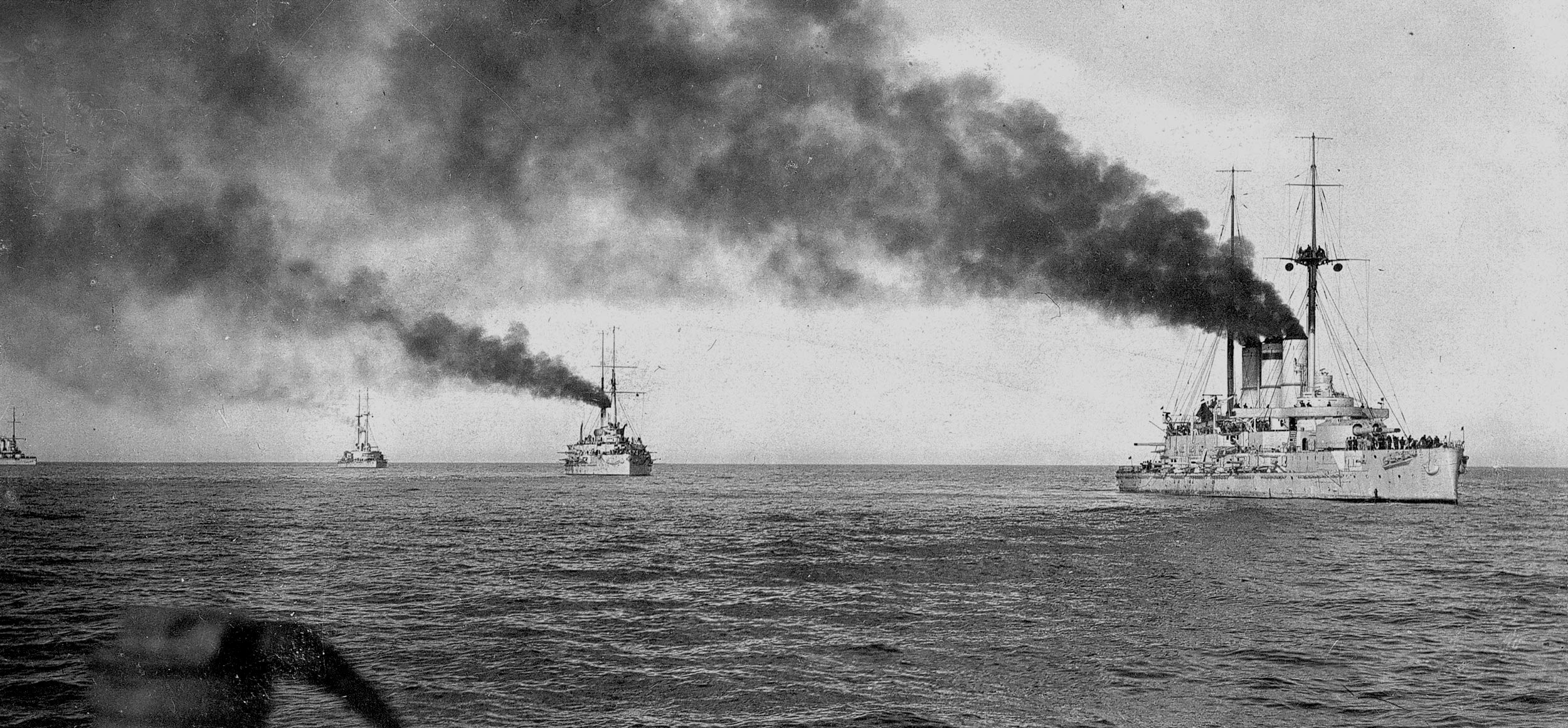
The Black Sea Fleet's battleship brigade in line ahead led by Ioann Zlatoust

The Black Sea basin was the domain of both the Russian and Ottoman Empires, but the Russian fleet dominated the sea. From their base in Sevastopol the Russians deployed a large fleet led by two skilled commanders: Admiral Eberhart and Admiral Kolchak (who took over in 1916).

Hostilities in the Black Sea started when the Ottoman fleet, prior to any declaration of war, bombarded several Russian cities in October 1914. Just two German ships spearheaded the Ottoman navy as its most advanced vessels: the battlecruiser SMS Goeben and light cruiser SMS Breslau, both under the command of Admiral Wilhelm Souchon. Goeben suffered damage on at least four occasions and was usually chased back to port by the superior Russian Navy. By the end of 1915, the Russian fleet had nearly complete control of the Black Sea.

The Black Sea Fleet supported General Yudenich in the Caucasus Campaign of 1914 to 1917 between the two empires. For example, in August 1915, a Russian submarine and two Russian destroyers attacked an Ottoman convoy of four transports escorted by a cruiser and two destroyers. The Russian ships sank all four transports without losing a ship.

On 14 October 1915 the Kingdom of Bulgaria joined the Central Powers in the war; in the same month the Black Sea Fleet bombarded the Bulgarian port of Varna.

During the summer of 1916, the Ottoman army under Vehip Pasha received orders to re-take Trebizond. The Ottoman forces tried to march along the coast in June but the Russian fleet was able to reduce the speed of their advance to a crawl using naval bombardment to harass the marching troops and to destroy their supply columns. Eventually the Ottoman army gave up and withdrew.

After Admiral Kolchak took command (August 1916), the Russian fleet re-mined the exit from the Bosporus, preventing nearly all Ottoman ships from entering the Black Sea; later that year, the Imperial Russian Navy also mined the naval approaches to Varna.

The greatest loss suffered by the Russian Black Sea Fleet occurred when the modern dreadnought Imperatritsa Mariya blew up in port on 7 October 1916 (just one year after it was commissioned) with the loss of 228 crew. The sinking of Imperatritsa Mariya was never fully explained; it could have been due to sabotage or to an accident.

== Revolution and Civil War ==
The Imperial Russian Navy was shattered by the twin shocks of the 1917 Revolution and the ensuing Civil War. During the first Russian Revolution in February (March) 1917, radical elements in the Baltic Fleet murdered Admrial Robert Viren and several other naval officers. Violent instability and mutiny then spread to the rest of the navy.

The declaration of the Russian Republic on September 1 1917, formally severed the navy's ties to the former Imperial family. The Bolshevik overthrow of the Russian Republic and Provisional Government in October 1917 then led to complete disintegration of naval command and cohesion. Ships and crews became divided among Bolshevik, White Russian, and foreign interventionist forces. Of the major fleets, only the Baltic Fleet based at Petrograd (formerly Saint Petersburg) remained relatively intact, though it suffered from mutinies and was largely destroyed by direct intervention of the Royal Navy during its campaign in the Baltic.

With the end of the First World War, allied forces intervened in Russia and occupied large areas of the country in the Pacific, Black Sea and Arctic regions. Many of the surviving warships from the Black Sea Fleet, whose crews remained loyal to the White Russian movement, were consolidated under the command of Pyotr Wrangel and eventually evacuated from Crimea when the White forces were defeated in the Civil War. Eventually these ships were interned in Bizerte, Tunisia rather than reintegrated into Soviet service.

In this chaotic situation, the Russian Imperial Navy simply dissolved, ultimately being replaced by the Soviet Navy of the Bolsheviks.

== Organization ==
=== 19th century to World War I ===
==== Administration and high command ====
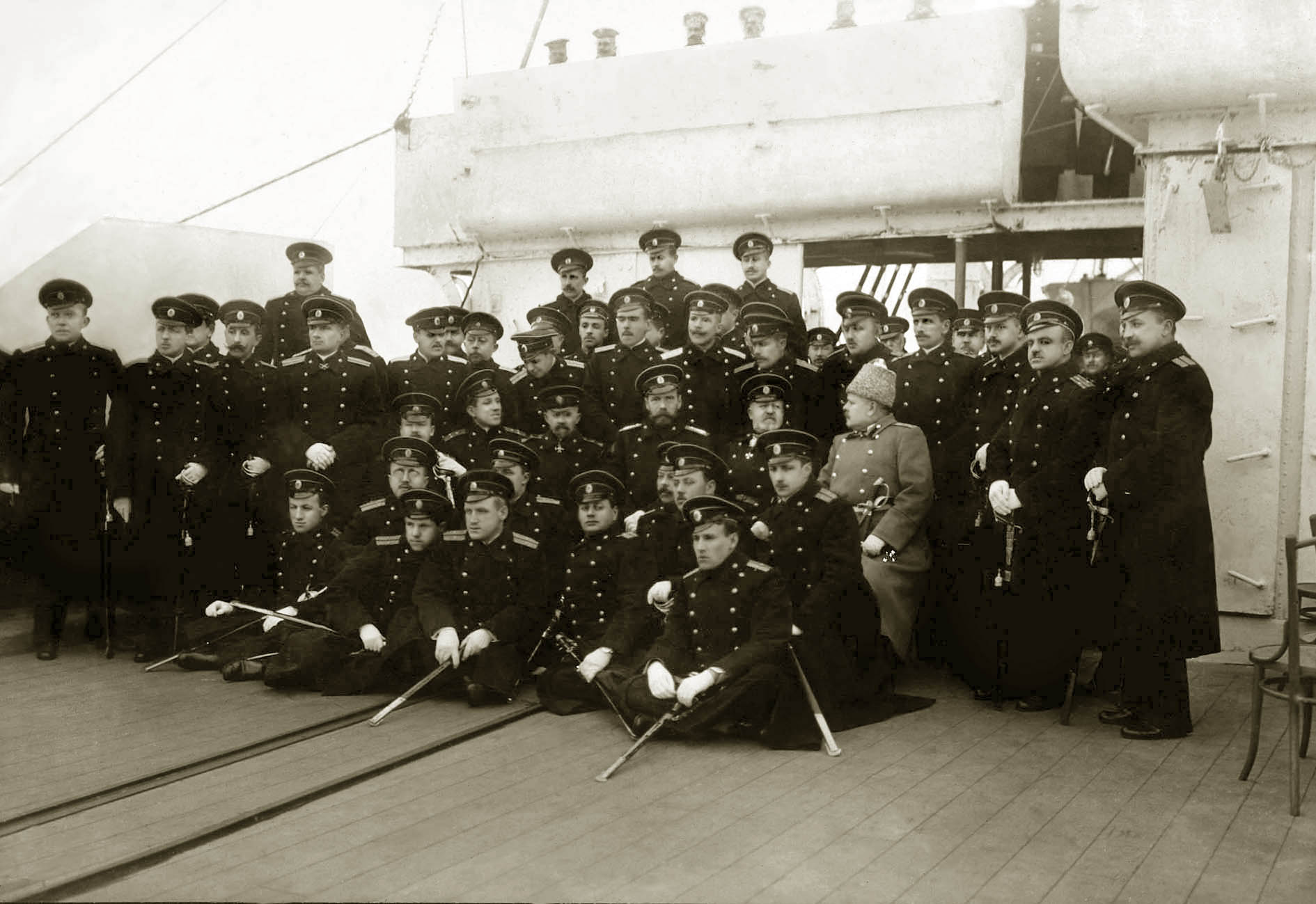
Emperor Nicholas II with Baltic Fleet officers, including Admirals Essen and Kolchak

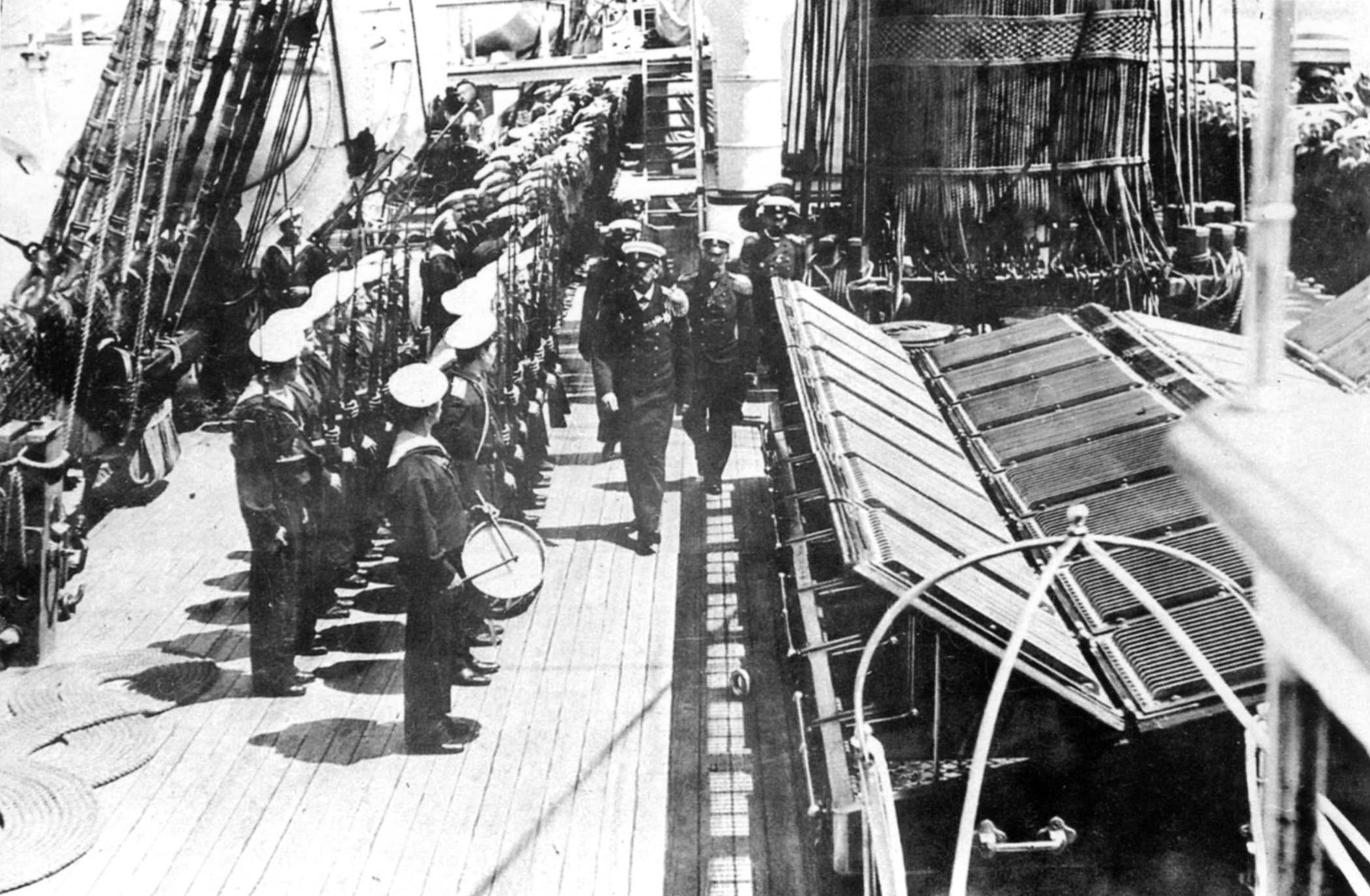
An admiral boarding the cruiser Dmitry Donskoi

The Emperor of Russia was the commander-in-chief of the armed forces and administered the fleet through the Ministry of the Navy. After the creation of the State Duma the Navy also had to negotiate with the defense committee in the parliament for approval to finance its armament plans. The rank and post of General Admiral was the ceremonial head of the navy and was held by a member of the Romanov dynasty. The Director of the Navy Ministry assisted the General Admiral. The position of General Admiral was abolished in 1905 after the defeat to Japan and the Navy Minister became the head of the Navy. Within the Ministry, the Main Staff was responsible for the overall administration of the navy as well as the preparations for war. There was also the Main Administration for Shipbuilding and Supplying and the Naval Technological Committee. The roles of all three organizations were broad and they had disputes over their jurisdictions. There was no separate naval general staff for setting strategic doctrine and operational planning, and the role of deciding on strategy was given to special commissions of admirals that were led by the General Admiral or the Director of the Navy Ministry. In 1902, there was a proposal to form an operations section in the Main Staff and other naval staffs in each fleet of the navy, but it was not until 1906 that Emperor Nicholas II created a Naval General Staff. From that point the Main Staff was only responsible for administrative tasks, leaving strategic and operational planning to the new organization.

The Chief of the Naval General Staff became the closest adviser to the Navy Minister. The staff was organized into six sections, including operational sections for the Baltic Sea, the Black Sea, and the Russian Far East (which also coordinated with the fleet staffs on construction programs), the organization and mobilization section (later the organization and tactical section), the statistical and intelligence section, and the historical section. Unlike in the Imperial Army, where the Army General Staff officers had their own insignia and titles, becoming a separate branch within the officer corps, the first chief of the Naval General Staff had his officers use the same uniforms as the rest of the fleet and tried to keep close relations between staff officers and those that went to sea. Graduating from the Nikolaev Naval Academy was not necessary to be on the Naval General Staff, another difference from the Army, where all General Staff officers had to be graduates of the Nikolaev General Staff Academy. After World War I broke out, joint army-navy staffs were formed in different theaters and at the Stavka, though the structure of the naval command remained the same until 1917, when the Russian Provisional Government made significant changes, though the Naval General Staff continued to exist.

Given the geographic situation and Russian tradition, the Imperial Navy had a secondary role to the Army, which was maintained in large numbers during peacetime to defend the Russian frontiers. Russia's access to ports that did not freeze over in the winter were limited to the most southern ports on the Baltic Sea, far from Saint Petersburg, and those on the Black Sea, which were closed in by the Turkish-controlled straits of Bosphorus. In the Russian Far East, most of the coast was too remote and undeveloped, while the port of Vladivostok was very close to Japan and also froze in the winter. The distance between these three theaters required passing long distances through waters controlled by other countries and that could be closed off. Passing through the Arctic Ocean was not possible without using icebreakers. Therefore, the Russian Navy was organized into separate fleets.

==== Tactical organization ====
The Imperial Navy was organized into two main fleets: the Baltic Fleet, tasked with defending the Gulf of Finland and Russian interests abroad, and the Black Sea Fleet, to defend Russian interests in the south and counter the Ottoman Navy. There were also the Siberian Flotilla and the Caspian squadron, though the former was devastated during the Russo-Japanese War. In addition to these, the Society of the Volunteer Fleet provided a fleet of fast steamers crewed by retired officers and sailors, or reservists. Operational planning for the fleets was done by the fleet staffs, which took on a greater role during World War I and sometimes had disputes with the Naval General Staff.

==== Personnel ====
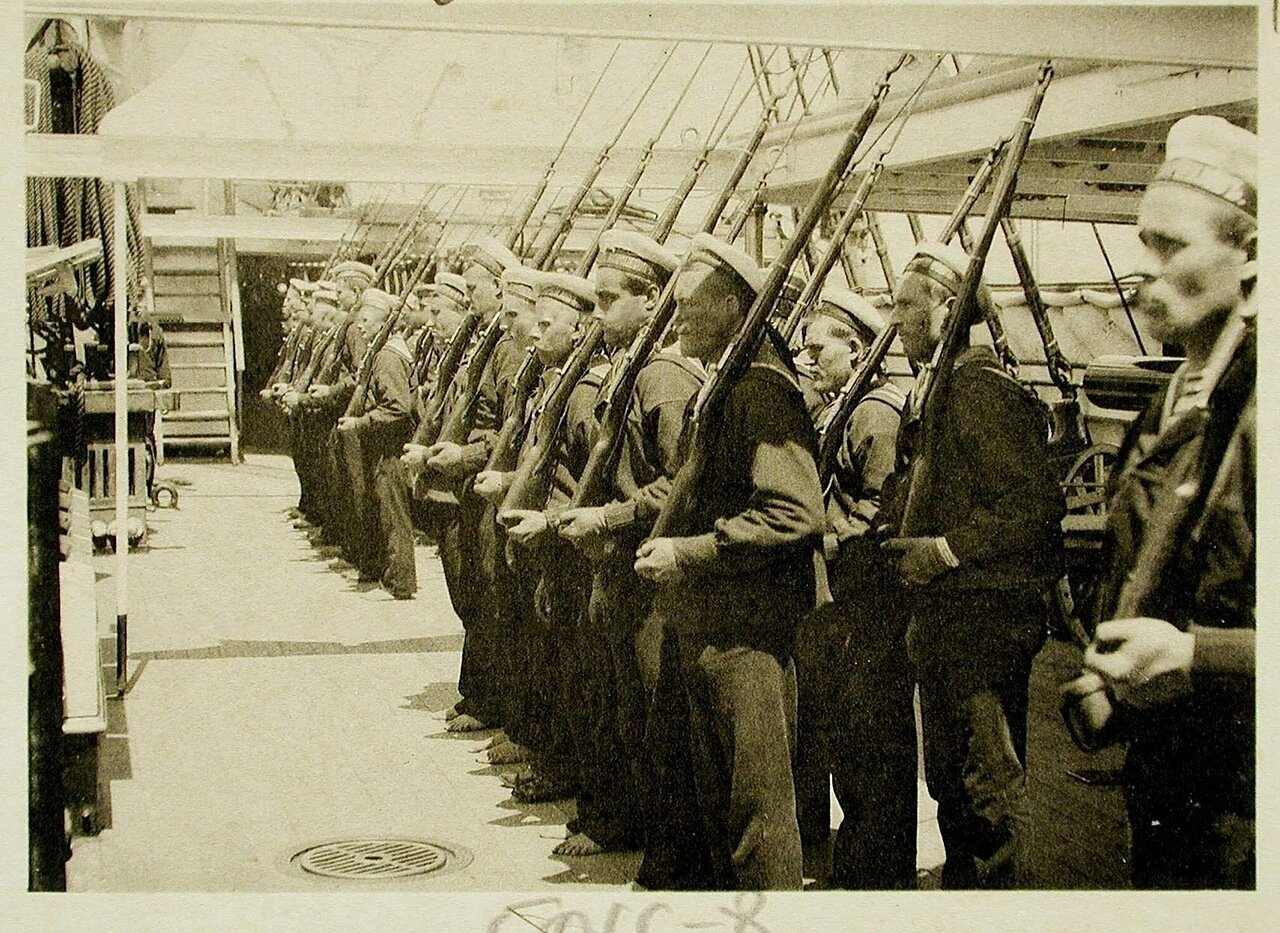
Russian sailors on the cruiser Admiral Kornilov, 1895

The conscription law of 14 January 1874 provided the basis for mandatory military service for men of the Russian Empire between the ages of 21 and 43 for a term of up to six years. The navy received much fewer conscripts than the army. For instance, in 1911 a total of 455,000 men were called up for the annual draft, out which 10,000 went to the navy, 14,500 to the border guard, and 430,500 to the army.

Naval conscripts traditionally came from the peasantry, though by the end of the 19th century the navy preferred those from the urban working class because they had more mechanical skills. There was a shortage of experienced petty officers because conscripts tended to leave the service after their term was complete, which meant that the navy was left without enough enlisted leaders between the sailors and the officers. Training for the crews was carried out in the Baltic Sea by tradition, though by the 1890s the training squadron consisted of obsolete ships suffering from mechanical problems, and the training was minimal. Officers had difficulty training illiterate conscripts from the interior of the empire to turn them into sailors, and the long winters in the Baltic also limited training opportunities. Most naval officers were from the nobility, and many of them were descended from Baltic German or Swedish families with a tradition of naval service. In Russia a career as a naval officer was considered to have less prestige than an army officer, and the navy had less opportunities for advancement.

The Naval Cadet Corps was the officer initial training and commissioning establishment. The Russian Empire had several cadet corps for the army and one for the navy. They were military boarding schools that accepted the sons of the wealthy landed nobility when they were teenagers and provided an education in academics and military subjects. The Naval Cadet Corps was a three-year program that taught mathematics, foreign languages, navigation and other naval sciences, and practical training. Graduates of the Corps were commissioned with the rank of michman in the Imperial Navy.

A staff college existed in the form of the Nikolayev Naval Academy, which provided further scientific and technical training as well as a course on theoretical subjects such as naval history, strategy, tactics, and maritime law. Specifically, there were three departments and one course: a hydrographic department for fleet officers, a ship building department for ship engineers, and a mechanical department for mechanical engineers, and a naval science course for staff officers. Officers had the option of attending the academy as senior lieutenants or captains, though it did not receive a large number of applicants because it was perceived by many officers as not being beneficial.

A submarine training unit was created in 1905 to prepare officers and sailors for the submarine service. From 1909 its officer graduates received a submarine officer badge. The school was initially located in Libau before being transferred to Petrograd in 1915, during World War I. It continued to train crews for the expanding submarine fleet during the war. The training unit stopped functioning for several years after the Revolution in 1917, but was restarted in 1925 for the Soviet Navy and continued functioning through World War II.

== Ranks and insignia ==
See for a more detailed history, ranks and rank insignia

Beginning in the second half of the 19th century, ranks of the Russian Navy were divided according to specialty and branch.

Different material colours of the shoulder board insignia denote the branches. These are mostly the deck rank insignia.
Deck ranks	Coastal troops ranks	Mechanical engineer ranks	Ship engineer ranks	Shoulder strap
Nizhniye chiny (Enlisted ranks)
Matros vtoroi stat'i (Matrose); Sailor of the 2nd article	Morskoi soldat (Soldat); Naval soldier	No equivalent		
Matros pervoi stat'i Sailor of the 1st article	Morskoi yefreitor (Gefreiter); Naval corporal	No equivalent		
Unter-ofitsery (Non-commissioned officers)
Kvartirmeister (Quartiermeister); Quartermaster	Morskoi mladshii unter-ofitzer (Unteroffizier); Naval junior sergeant	No equivalent		
Botzmanmat (Bootsmannsmaat); Boatswain's mate	Morskoi starshii unter-ofitser Naval senior sergeant	No equivalent		
Botzman (Bootsmann); Boatswain	Morskoi feldfebel (Feldwebel); Naval sergeant major	No equivalent		
Konduktor; Conductor	Morskoi podpraporshchik Naval junior ensign	No equivalent		
Konduktor; Conductor	Morskoi Zauryad-praporshchik; Naval deputy ensign	No equivalent		
Ober-ofitsery (Company officers)
No equivalent	Praporschik po admiralteistvu Ensign of the admiralty	No equivalent		
Michman; Midshipman	Podporuchik po admiralteistvu Junior lieutenant of the admiralty	Inzhener-mekhanik-michman; Engineer mechanic midshipman	Podporuchik; Junior lieutenant	
Leitenant; Lieutenant	Poruchik po admiralteistvu Lieutenant of the admiralty	Inzhener-mekhanik-leitenant; Engineer mechanic lieutenant	Poruchik; Lieutenant	
Starshii leitenant Senior lieutenant	Shtabs-kapitan po admiralteistvu (Stabskapitän); Staff captain of the admiralty	Inzhener-mekhanik-starshii leitenant Engineer mechanic senior lieutenant	Shtabs-kapitan; Staff captain	
Starshii leitenant Senior lieutenant	Kapitan po admiraltei'stvu Captain of the admiralty	Inzhener-mekhanik-starshii leitenant Engineer mechanic senior lieutenant	Kapitan; Captain	
Shtab-Ofitsery (Field officers)
Kapitan vtorogo ranga Captain 2nd rank	Podpolkovnik po admiralteistvu Lieutenant colonel of the admiralty	Inzhener-mekhanik-kapitan vtorogo ranga Engineer mechanic captain 2nd rank	Podpolkovnik; Lieutenant colonel	
Kapitan pervogo ranga Captain 1st rank	Polkovnik po admiralteistvu Colonel of the admiralty	Inzhener-mekhanik-kapitan pervogo ranga Engineer mechanic captain 1st rank	Polkovnik; Colonel	
Flag-ofitzery (Flag officers)
Kontr-admiral (Konteradmiral); Rear admiral	General-maior po admiralteistvu (Generalmajor); Major general of the admiralty	Inzhener-mekhanik-kontr-admiral; Engineer mechanic rear admiral	General-maior; Major general	
Vitze-admiral (Vizeadmiral); Vice admiral	General-leitenant po admiralteistvu (Generalleutnant); Lieutenant general of the admiralty	Inzhener-mekhanik-vitze-admiral; Engineer mechanic vice admiral	General-leitenant; Lieutenant general	
Admiral; Admiral	General po admiralteistvu General of the admiralty	No equivalent		
General-admiral; General admiral				

== Equipment ==
- Battleships
  - Dreadnought
- Cruisers
- Destroyers
- Sail frigates
- Ironclads
- Ships of the line
- Steam frigates
- During a specific period
  - Russo-Japanese War
  - World War I

== Sources ==
- Beskrovny, L. G. The Russian Army and Fleet in the Nineteenth Century. (1996). Gulf Breeze.
- Boyevaya letopis' russkogo flota. Khronika vazhneishikh sobytii voyennoi istorii russkogo flota s IX veka po 1917 god. Voyenizdat, Moskva, 1948. (Combat Annales of the Russian Navy. Chronicle of the Most Important Events of the Russian Navy History from the 9th century up to 1917)
- Corbett, Julian, Sir. Maritime Operations in the Russo-Japanese War 1904–1905. (1994). ISBN 1-55750-129-7
- Cracraft, James (2009). The Revolution of Peter the Great. Harvard University Press. p. 47. ISBN 978-0674029941.
- Forczyk, Robert. Russian Battleship vs Japanese Battleship, Yellow Sea 1904–05. (2009) Osprey. ISBN 978-1-84603-330-8.
- Grant, R. Captain. Before Port Arthur in a Destroyer; The Personal Diary of a Japanese Naval Officer. London: John Murray; first and second editions published in 1907.
- Halpern, Paul G. (1994). A Naval History of World War I. Annapolis: Naval Institute Press. ISBN 978-1-61251-172-6.
- Lebedev A.A. To march and battle ready? The combat capabilities of naval squadrons Russian sailing fleet XVIII – mid XIX centuries. from the point of view of the status of their personnel. SPb, 2015. ISBN 978-5-904180-94-2
- Olender, Piotr. Russo-Japanese Naval War 1904–1905, Vol. 2, Battle of Tsushima. (2010); Published by Stratus s.c., Sandomierz, Poland. ISBN 978-83-61421-02-3.
- Papastratigakis, Nicholas (2011). Russian Imperialism and Naval Power: Military Strategy and the Build-Up to the Russo-Japanese War. London: Bloomsbury Publishing. ISBN 978-1-8488-5691-2.
- Pleshakov, Constantine. The Tsar's Last Armada: The Epic Voyage to the Battle of Tsushima. (2002). ISBN 0-465-05792-6
- Reese, Roger R. (2019). The Imperial Russian Army in Peace, War, and Revolution, 1856-1917. Lawrence: University Press of Kansas. ISBN 978-0-7006-2860-5.
- Semenov, Vladimir, Capt. The Battle of Tsushima. Originally published in 1907. (1912) E. P. Dutton & CO.
- Showell, Jak M. The U-Boat Century; German Submarine Warfare 1906–2006. (2006); Chatham Publishing, Great Britain. ISBN 1-86176-241-0.
- Russian Warships in the Age of Sail, 1696–1860: Design, Construction, Careers and Fates. John Tredrea and Eduard Sozaev. Seaforth Publishing, 2010. ISBN 978-1-84832-058-1.
- Vinogradov, Sergei E. (1998). "Battleship Development in Russia from 1905 to 1917". Warship International. 35 (3): 267–90. JSTOR 44892563.
- Westwood, J. N. (1994). Russian Naval Construction, 1905–45. London: Palgrave Macmillan. ISBN 978-1-349-12458-9.
