= List of dreadnought battleships of Russia =

After the end of the disastrous Russo-Japanese War of 1904–05, the Imperial Russian Navy needed several years to absorb the lessons of that war, particularly from the Battle of Tsushima. Design work continued during this period, but designs for dreadnought battleships evolved constantly as new requirements were made. By late 1907, a consensus had been reached by the Russian Naval General Staff and an international design competition was ordered after domestic protests arose after the selection of a design by the British firm of Vickers. A Russian design was ultimately selected, albeit with extensive support from foreign companies, but money was tight and the ships took over five years to complete. All four ships survived World War I, but one was badly damaged in a fire while in reserve a few years later and was hulked. The three intact ships were modernized before World War II and they all participated in the war, primarily by providing naval gunfire support. All four ships were scrapped after the war.

Although the Black Sea Fleet had survived the Russo-Japanese War intact, it consisted solely of obsolete predreadnoughts that would be out-classed if the Ottoman Navy purchased any dreadnoughts. News of Turkish plans to do so from British shipyards in 1910 prompted the Naval General Staff to start design work on a class of dreadnoughts based on the Gangut-class battleships. A reduction in speed was accepted in order to increase the armor thickness, but the ships otherwise greatly resembled the previous class. One of these ships was destroyed during World War I by a magazine explosion, another was scuttled to avoid surrender and the third was captured by the Whites during the Russian Civil War and joined Wrangel's fleet in exile. Another dreadnought was ordered in 1914 after news was received that the Ottoman Turks had ordered another dreadnought in order to maintain superiority. To save time, the ship's design was derived from the previous Imperatritsa Mariya class, although with thicker armor. Her construction was suspended during the war and the ship was later scrapped in the 1920s.

In the late 1930s, the Soviets began an ambitious plan of naval expansion in reaction to the naval construction program already begun by Nazi Germany. The centerpiece of this plan was a total of 16 very large battleships. Only four of these ships were begun, and one had already been cancelled, before Nazi Germany invaded the Soviet Union in June 1941. Construction was suspended during the war and all four hulls were scrapped in the late 1940s.

== Key ==
Main guns	The number and type of the main battery guns
Armor	Waterline belt thickness
Displacement	Ship displacement at full load
Propulsion	Number of shafts, type of propulsion system, and top speed in knots
Service	The dates work began and finished on the ship and its ultimate fate
Laid down	The date the keel began to be assembled
Launched	The date the ship was launched
Completed	The date the ship was finished

== Gangut class ==
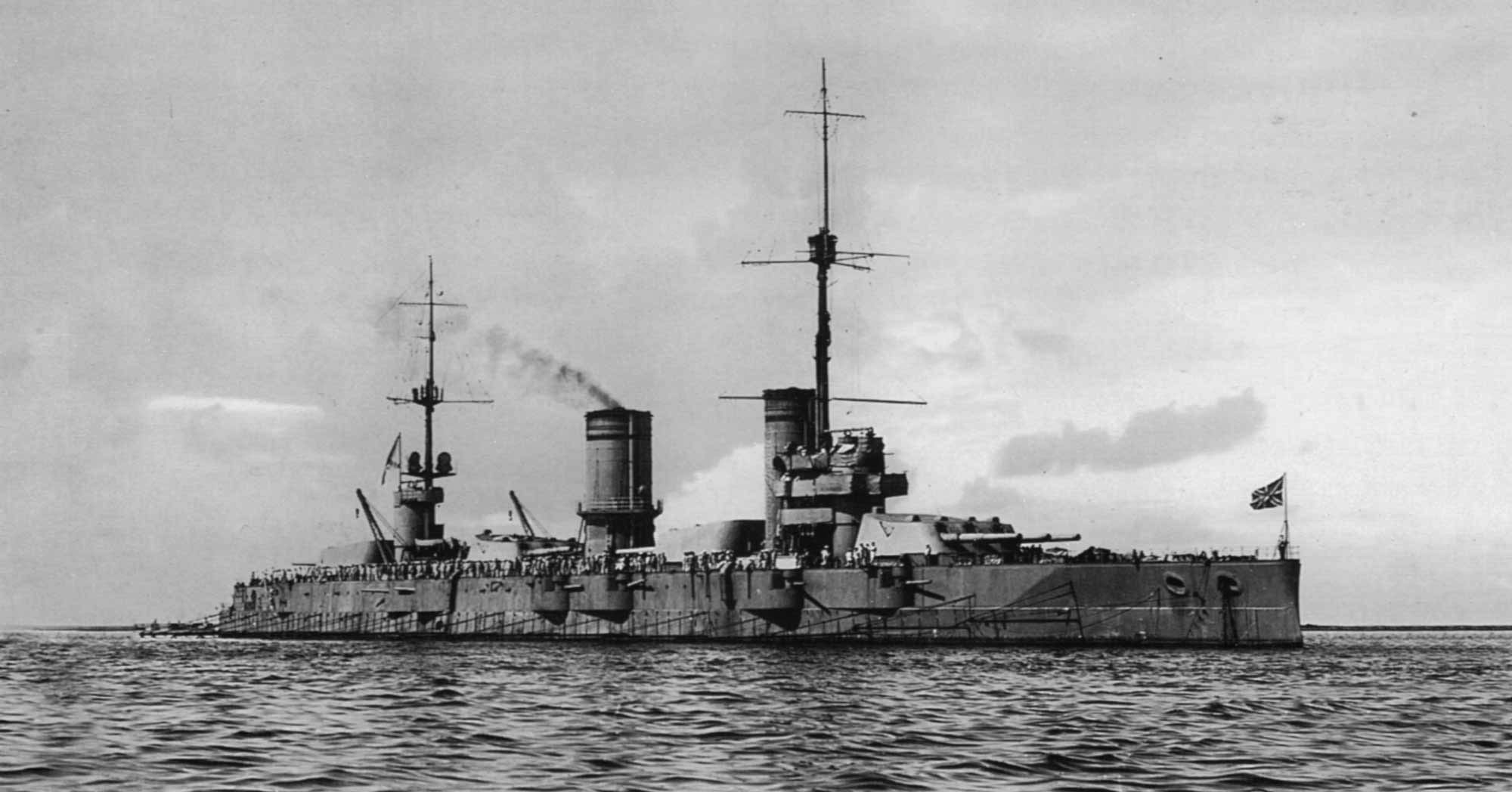
Gangut in 1915

The Gangut-class battleships were the first dreadnoughts begun for the Imperial Russian Navy before World War I. They had a convoluted design history involving several British companies, evolving requirements, an international design competition, and foreign protests. Their role was to defend the mouth of the Gulf of Finland against the Germans, who never tried to enter, so the ships spent their time training and providing cover for minelaying operations. Their crews participated in the general mutiny of the Baltic Fleet after the February Revolution in 1917, and joined the Bolsheviks the following year. The Russians were forced to evacuate their naval base at Helsinki after Finland became independent in December 1917. (Note: All dates used in this article are New Style) The Gangut-class ships led the first contingent of ships to Kronstadt even though the Gulf of Finland was still frozen.

All of the dreadnoughts except for Petropavlovsk were laid up in October–November 1918 for lack of manpower. Poltava was severely damaged by a fire while laid up in 1919. Petropavlovsk was retained in commission to defend Kronstadt and Leningrad against the British forces supporting the Whites Russians although she also helped to suppress a mutiny by the garrison of Fort Krasnaya Gorka in 1919. Her crew, and that of the Sevastopol, joined the Kronstadt rebellion of March 1921. After it was bloodily crushed, those ships were given proper 'revolutionary' names. Parizhskaya Kommuna, the former Sevastopol, was modified in 1928 to improve her sea-keeping abilities so that she could be transferred to the Black Sea Fleet which had nothing heavier than a light cruiser available. This proved to be the first of a series of modernizations where each ship of the class was progressively reconstructed and improved. A number of proposals were made in the 1930s to rebuild Frunze, ex-Poltava, to match her sisters or even as a battlecruiser by removing one turret, but these came to naught and she was hulked preparatory to scrapping.

The two ships of the Baltic Fleet did not play a prominent role in the Winter War, but did have their anti-aircraft guns significantly increased before Operation Barbarossa in 1941. However this did not help either ship as they attempted to provide fire support for the defenders of Leningrad. Marat had her bow blown off and Oktyabrskaya Revolyutsiya was badly damaged by multiple bomb hits in September. The former was sunk, but later raised and became a floating battery for the duration of the Siege of Leningrad while the latter spent over a year under repair, although this was lengthened by subsequent bomb hits while under repair. Both ships bombarded German and Finnish troops so long as they remained within reach, but Oktyabrskaya Revolyutsiya did not venture away from Kronstadt for the duration of the war. Parizhskaya Kommuna remained in Sevastopol until forced to evacuate by advancing German troops. She made one trip to besieged Sevastopol in December 1941 and made a number of bombardments in support of the Kerch Offensive during January–March 1942. She was withdrawn from combat in April as German aerial supremacy had made it too risky to risk such a large target.

Sevastopol and Oktyabrskaya Revolyutsiya remained on the active list after the end of the war although little is known of their activities. Both were reclassified as 'school battleships' (uchebnyi lineinyi korabl) in 1954 and stricken in 1956 after which they were slowly scrapped. There were several plans (Project 27) to reconstruct Petropavlovsk using the bow of Frunze, but they were not accepted and were formally cancelled on 29 June 1948. The ship was renamed Volkhov in 1950 and served as a stationary training ship until stricken in 1953 and subsequently broken up. Frunze was finally scrapped beginning in 1949.

Ship	Main guns	Armor	Displacement	Propulsion	Service			
Ship	Main guns	Armor	Displacement	Propulsion	Laid down	Launched	Completed	Fate
Gangut (Russian: Гангут)	12 × 12 in (305 mm)	225 mm (8.9 in)	24,400 long tons (24,800 t)	4 screws, steam turbines, 24 kn (44 km/h; 28 mph)	16 June 1909	20 October 1911	11 January 1915	Stricken, 17 February 1956
Petropavlovsk (Russian: Петропавловск)	12 × 12 in (305 mm)	225 mm (8.9 in)	24,400 long tons (24,800 t)	4 screws, steam turbines, 24 kn (44 km/h; 28 mph)	16 June 1909	22 September 1911	5 January 1915	Stricken, 4 September 1953
Sevastopol (Russian: Севастополь)	12 × 12 in (305 mm)	225 mm (8.9 in)	24,400 long tons (24,800 t)	4 screws, steam turbines, 24 kn (44 km/h; 28 mph)	16 June 1909	10 July 1911	30 November 1914	Scrapped beginning in 1949.
Poltava (Russian: Полтава)	12 × 12 in (305 mm)	225 mm (8.9 in)	24,400 long tons (24,800 t)	4 screws, steam turbines, 24 kn (44 km/h; 28 mph)	16 June 1909	23 July 1911	30 December 1914	Stricken, 17 February 1956

== Imperatritsa Mariya class ==
The Imperatritsa Mariya-class (Russian: Императрица Мария) battleships were the first dreadnoughts built for the Black Sea Fleet of the Imperial Russian Navy. All three ships were built in Nikolayev during World War I. Two ships were delivered in 1915 and saw some combat against ex-German warships that had been 'gifted' to the Ottoman Empire, but the third was not completed until 1917 and saw no combat due to the disorder in the navy after the February Revolution earlier that year.

Imperatritsa Mariya was sunk by a magazine explosion in Sevastopol harbor in 1916. Imperatritsa Ekaterina Velikaya, having been renamed Svobodnaya Rossiya in 1917, was scuttled in Novorossiysk harbor in 1918 to prevent her from being turned over to the Germans as required by the Treaty of Brest-Litovsk. The crew of Volya, as Imperator Aleksandr III had been renamed in 1917, voted to turn her over to the Germans. They were only able to make one training cruise before they had to turn her over the victorious Allies in 1918 as part of the armistice terms. The British took control of her, but turned her over to the White Russians in 1920 who renamed her General Alekseyev. She only had one operable gun turret by this time and she provided some fire support for the Whites, but it was not enough. They were forced to evacuate the Crimea later that year and sailed for Bizerte where she was interned by the French. She was eventually scrapped there during the 1930s to pay her docking fees.

Ship	Main guns	Armor	Displacement	Propulsion	Service			
Ship	Main guns	Armor	Displacement	Propulsion	Laid down	Launched	Completed	Fate
Imperatritsa Mariya (Russian: Императрица Мария)	12 × 12 in	262.5 mm (10.3 in)	23,413 long tons (23,789 t)	4 screws, steam turbines, 21 kn (39 km/h; 24 mph)	30 October 1911	19 October 1913	10 June 1915	Exploded 20 October 1916; Stricken 21 November 1925
Imperatritsa Ekaterina Velikaya (Russian: Императрица Екатерина Великая)	12 × 12 in	262.5 mm (10.3 in)	23,413 long tons (23,789 t)	4 screws, steam turbines, 21 kn (39 km/h; 24 mph)	30 October 1911	6 June 1913	18 October 1915	Scuttled, 19 June 1918
Imperator Aleksandr III (Russian: Император Александр Третий)	12 × 12 in	262.5 mm (10.3 in)	23,413 long tons (23,789 t)	4 screws, steam turbines, 21 kn (39 km/h; 24 mph)	30 October 1911	15 April 1914	28 June 1917	Sold for scrap, 1936

== Imperator Nikolai I ==
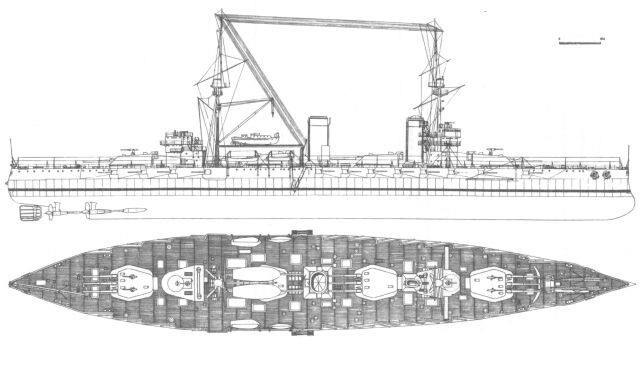
Right elevation drawing of Imperator Nikolai I

Imperator Nikolai I (Russian: Император Николай I) was built during World War I for service in the Black Sea. She was designed to counter the multiple Ottoman orders for dreadnoughts which raised the possibility that the Russian dreadnoughts being built for the Black Sea Fleet could be out-numbered. The ship used the same main armament as the preceding Imperatritsa Mariya class, but was larger and more heavily armored. Imperator Nikolai I was launched in 1916, but construction was suspended on 24 October 1917. The Soviets considered completing her in 1923, but rejected the idea. She was towed to Sevastopol in 1927 and scrapped.

Ship	Main guns	Armour	Displacement	Propulsion	Service		
Ship	Main guns	Armour	Displacement	Propulsion	Laid down	Launched	Fate
Imperator Nikolai I (Russian: Император Николай I)	12 × 12 in	270 mm (11 in)	31,877 long tons (32,389 t)	4 screws, steam turbines, 21 kn (39 km/h; 24 mph)	28 April 1915	18 October 1916	Scrapped beginning 28 June 1927

== Sovetsky Soyuz class ==
The Sovetsky Soyuz-class battleships (Project 23, Russian: Советский Союз), also known as "Stalin's Republics", were a class of battleships begun by the Soviet Union in the late 1930s but never brought into service. They were designed in response to the battleships being built by Germany. These ships would have rivaled the Imperial Japanese Yamato class in size if any had been completed, although with significantly weaker firepower: 406-millimeter (16.0 in) guns compared to the 460-millimeter (18.1 in) guns of the Japanese ships. However they would have been superior to their German rivals, the Bismarck class, at least on paper. The failure of the Soviet armor plate industry to build cemented armor plates thicker than 230 millimeters (9.1 in) would have negated any advantages from the Sovetsky Soyuz class's thicker armor in combat.

Construction of the first four ships was plagued with difficulties as the Soviet shipbuilding and related industries were not prepared to build such large ships. One battleship, Sovetskaya Belorussiya, was cancelled on 19 October 1940 to divert resources to an expanded army rearmament program, after serious construction flaws were found. Construction of the other three ships was suspended in June 1941, and never resumed. All three of the surviving hulls were scrapped in the late 1940s.

Ship	Main guns	Armor	Displacement	Propulsion	Service		
Ship	Main guns	Armor	Displacement	Propulsion	Laid down	Launched	Fate
Sovetsky Soyuz (Russian: Советский Союз)	9 × 406 mm (16.0 in)	420 mm (16.5 in)	65,150 tonnes (64,120 long tons)	4 screws, steam turbines, 28 kn (52 km/h; 32 mph)	15 July 1938	Never	Ordered scrapped, 29 May 1948
Sovetskaya Ukraina (Russian: Советская Украина)	9 × 406 mm (16.0 in)	420 mm (16.5 in)	65,150 tonnes (64,120 long tons)	4 screws, steam turbines, 28 kn (52 km/h; 32 mph)	31 October 1938	Never	Ordered scrapped, 27 March 1947
Sovetskaya Rossiya (Russian: Советская Россия)	9 × 406 mm (16.0 in)	420 mm (16.5 in)	65,150 tonnes (64,120 long tons)	4 screws, steam turbines, 28 kn (52 km/h; 32 mph)	22 July 1940	Never	Ordered scrapped, 27 March 1947
Sovetskaya Belorussiya (Russian: Советская Белоруссия)	9 × 406 mm (16.0 in)	420 mm (16.5 in)	65,150 tonnes (64,120 long tons)	4 screws, steam turbines, 28 kn (52 km/h; 32 mph)	21 December 1939	Never	Cancelled, 19 October 1940

== Notes ==
Footnotes

Citations
