= Cape Mykolaia =

Cape on the southern coast of Crimea

Coordinates: 44°23′12″N 33°46′38″E

Cape Mykolaia

Cape Mykolaia (Ukrainian: мис Миколая, romanized: mys Mykolaia) is a cape on the southern coast of Crimea, one of the southernmost points of the peninsula (the other is Cape Sarych).
