= Andrei Eberhardt =

Russian admiral

Admiral Andrei Eberhardt
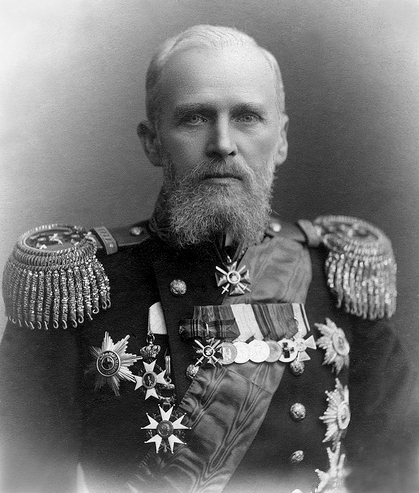
- Born: Andrei Avgustovich Ebergard; 9 November 1856; Patras, Greece
- Died: 19 April 1919 (aged 62); Petrograd, Russian SFSR
- Burial place: Novodeviche Cemetery
- Military career
- Allegiance: Russian Empire
- Branch: Imperial Russian Navy
- Service years: 1878–1916
- Rank: Admiral
- Commands: Black Sea Fleet
- Conflicts: Boxer Rebellion; Russo-Japanese War; World War I

Andrei Augustovich Ebergard (Russian: Андрей Августович Эбергард; 9 November 1856 – 19 April 1919) was an Imperial Russian Navy admiral of German ancestry.

== Biography ==
Eberhardt was born in Patras, Greece, where his father, August Eberhardt, served as the consul for the Russian Empire. He had Westphalian ancestry; his grandfather Johann Karl Eberhardt moved from Hamburg to Russia during the early-19th century. He was not baptised a Lutheran but an Orthodox because his mother was Russian.

Eberhardt graduated from the Russian Marine Cadet Corps in 1878. From 1882 to 1884 he served in the Siberian Military Flotilla as a signals officer. In 1886, he became a flag officer and adjutant to Admiral Ivan Shestakov (Minister of the Navy, in office: 1882-1888) and in 1891 he became a flag officer to Admiral Pavel Petrovich Tyrtov commanding the Russian Pacific Squadron. In 1896 Eberhardt transferred to the Black Sea Fleet, serving as gunnery officer on the battleships Ekaterina II and Chesma. In 1898 he moved back to the Russian Far East; he commanded the cruiser Admiral Nakhimov and took part in suppressing the Boxer Rebellion of 1899-1901 in China.

During the Russo–Japanese War of 1904-1905 Eberhardt served as chief naval aide to Yevgeni Ivanovich Alekseyev, the Viceroy of the Russian Far East (in office: 1903-1904). In 1905 he captained the battleship Imperator Aleksandr II and in 1906 became captain of the battleship Panteleimon. He was promoted to rear admiral in 1907 and to vice admiral in 1909.

Eberhardt served as Chief of the Russian Naval General Staff from 1908 and as Commander-in-Chief of the Black Sea Fleet from 1911. Following the outbreak of World War I in 1914, his top achievement was setting up a naval blockade of the Zonguldak coal fields from 1915 and thus choking the coal supply of the German-Turkish fleet. He also commanded the Russian battleship squadron during the Battle of Cape Sarych (near the Crimea) in November 1914. However, he showed reluctance to start further offensive actions against Ottoman positions in the Bosporus, and Aleksandr Kolchak succeeded him in June 1916.

Eberhardt retired from service in December 1917. The Cheka arrested him in 1918, but then released him. He died in 1919 and was buried in the Novodevichy Cemetery (Russian: Новодевичье кладбище) in Petrograd.

== Honours and awards ==
- Order of St. Vladimir, 4th class with swords and bow (December 28, 1900), 3rd degree with swords, 2nd class with swords
- Gold Sword for Bravery
- Order of the White Eagle, with swords,
- Order of St. Alexander Nevsky with diamonds (for the Black Sea Fleet Command in 1914-1916.)
- Order of St. Stanislaus, 1st and 2nd classes
- Order of St. Anne, 1st and 2nd classes
- Order of St Michael and St George (United Kingdom)
- Order of the Rising Sun (Japan)
- Commander Grand Cross of the Order of the Sword (Sweden)
- Knight Grand Cross of the Legion of Honour, also awarded Commander and Chevalier (France)
- Commander of the Order of the Redeemer (Greece)
