= Sarych =

Headland in Crimea

Coordinates: 44°23′14″N 33°44′17″E

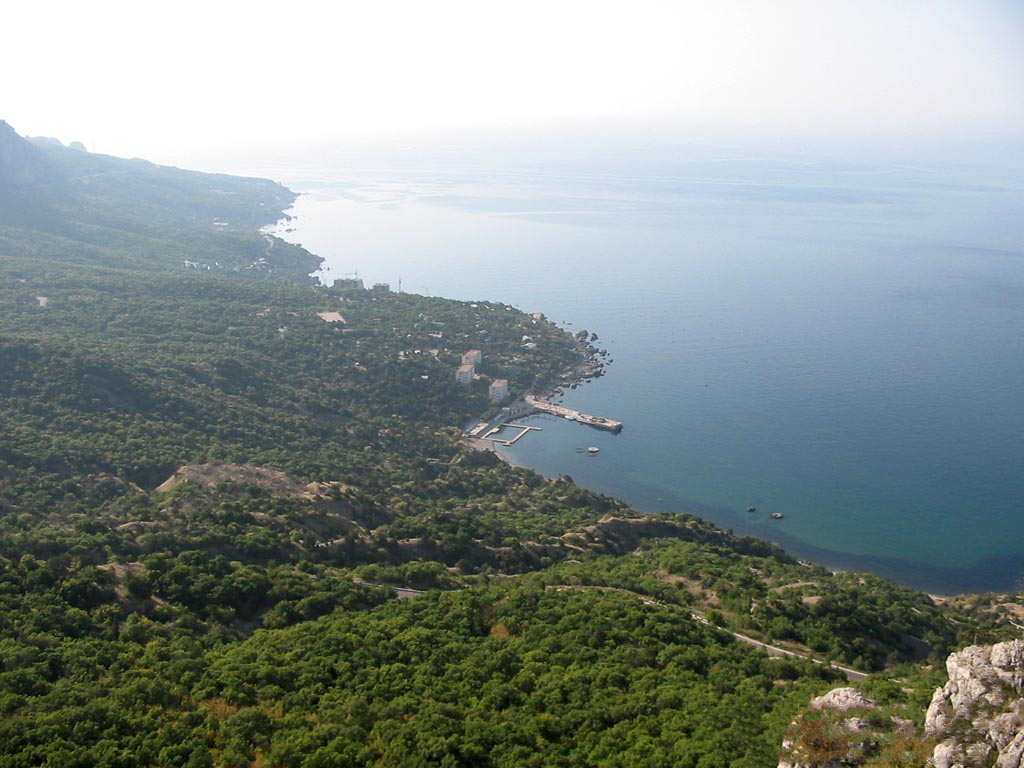
The Sarych headland on the northern shore of the Black Sea.

Sarych (Ukrainian: Сарич; Russian: Сарыч; Crimean Tatar: Sarıç) is a headland located on the shore of the Black Sea at the southern extremity of the Crimean Peninsula.

About five kilometers east of the Sarych headland lies the resort town of Foros. The city of Sevastopol is located about 30 kilometres (19 mi) away to the north-west, and Yalta about 40 kilometres (25 mi) away to the east. The distance from Sarych to the Kerempe headland of the Black Sea coast of Turkey is 229 kilometres (142 mi), making it the narrowest passage of the Black Sea.

== History ==
=== Ancient ===
The area presently known as Sarych was first referenced as Kriou metopon or Criu metopon (Ancient Greek: Κριοῦ μέτωπον), which means "ram's forehead" in Greek.

=== Battle of Cape Sarych ===
On November 18, 1914, elements of the Russian and Turkish navies fought a battle off the coast of Cape Sarych. The Turkish force consisted of the German-manned battle-cruiser SMS Goeben and the light cruiser SMS Breslau. Both ships were purchased by the Ottoman Empire and renamed as Yavuz and Midilli, although they retained their German crews. The Russian force consisted of five pre-dreadnought battleships. During the fight only a few salvoes were exchanged. The ships inflicted minor damage upon each other, but the commanding German admiral Wilhelm Souchon broke off the action after Goeben took a hit in one of her 15 cm casemates. Souchon felt the need to protect the Goeben, as the Ottoman Empire didn't provide facilities for repairing a modern ship like the Goeben.

=== Russia-Ukraine territorial dispute ===
Since August 3, 2005, a lighthouse on the headland has been occupied by the Russian Army. The Government Court in Sevastopol ruled the lighthouse needed to be returned to Ukraine, however Russian military officials said they were only subordinate to the chief of the Russian Navy. Ukrainian public activists said that Sarych was illegally occupied by the Russian Navy. The territory around the Sarych headland is closed to trespassers with barbed wire with the Russian flag flying above Sarych. The issue has since become a part of the broader 2014 Crimean crisis.

== See also ==
- Cape Mykolaia
