= Russian Naval General Staff =

The Russian Naval General Staff (Russian: Морской генеральный штаб, romanized: Morskoi generalnyi shtab) was created on May 7, 1906 by Tsar Nicholai II from the existing Research Unit of the Main Naval Staff after the Russo-Japanese War. Its mission was to formulate war plans and to decide the characteristics of new ships as the Main Naval Staff was too occupied with day-to-day matters. Its first head was Captain 1st Rank L. A. Brusilov, brother of General Aleksei Brusilov, and it initially was composed of only 15 officers. By the beginning of World War I it had expanded to 40 officers. It was disbanded by the Bolsheviks when they seized power in 1917.

== List of chiefs ==
- April 1906 – August 1908: Rear Admiral Lev Brusilov
- August 1908 – October 1911: Rear Admiral Andrei Eberhardt
- October 1911 – February 1914: Rear Admiral Alexander Karl Nikolai von Lieven
- April 1914 – March 1917: Vice Admiral Alexander Rusin
- April – June 1917: Rear Admiral Mikhail Kedrov
- July – November 1917: Rear Admiral Aleksey Kapnist
- November 1917 – April 1919: Captain 1st rank Yevgeny Berens
- April 1919 – April 1920: Senior Lieutenant Alexander Melentyev
