= Ivan Lebedev (disambiguation) =

Ivan Lebedev may refer to:

- Ivan Aleksandrovich Lebedev ( 1856 or 1861 – after 1917), Russian judge and politician
- Ivan Lebedeff (1894–1953), Russian-American film actor
- Ivan Lebedev a.k.a. Jean Lébédeff, (1884–1972), Russian-French painter and printmaker
- Ivan Lebedev (1850–1905), Russian naval officer
- Ivan Lebedev (wrestler) (1879–1950), Russian and Soviet professional wrestler
- Ivan Rom-Lebedev (1903–1991), Russian Romani actor, musician, and writer
