= Russian ship Tri Sviatitelia =

Two ships of the Imperial Russian Navy have been named Tri Sviatitelia (Three Holy Hierarchs).

- Russian ship of the line Tri Sviatitelia (ru:Три Святителя (линейный корабль, 1838)) - First rate ship of the line scuttled in 1854 during the Siege of Sevastopol
- Russian battleship Tri Sviatitelia - Predreadnought battleship assigned to the Black Sea Fleet during World War I
- ru:Трёх Иерархов (линейный корабль, 1766)
