= Russian destroyer Leytenant Shestakov =

WWI-era Russian destroyer

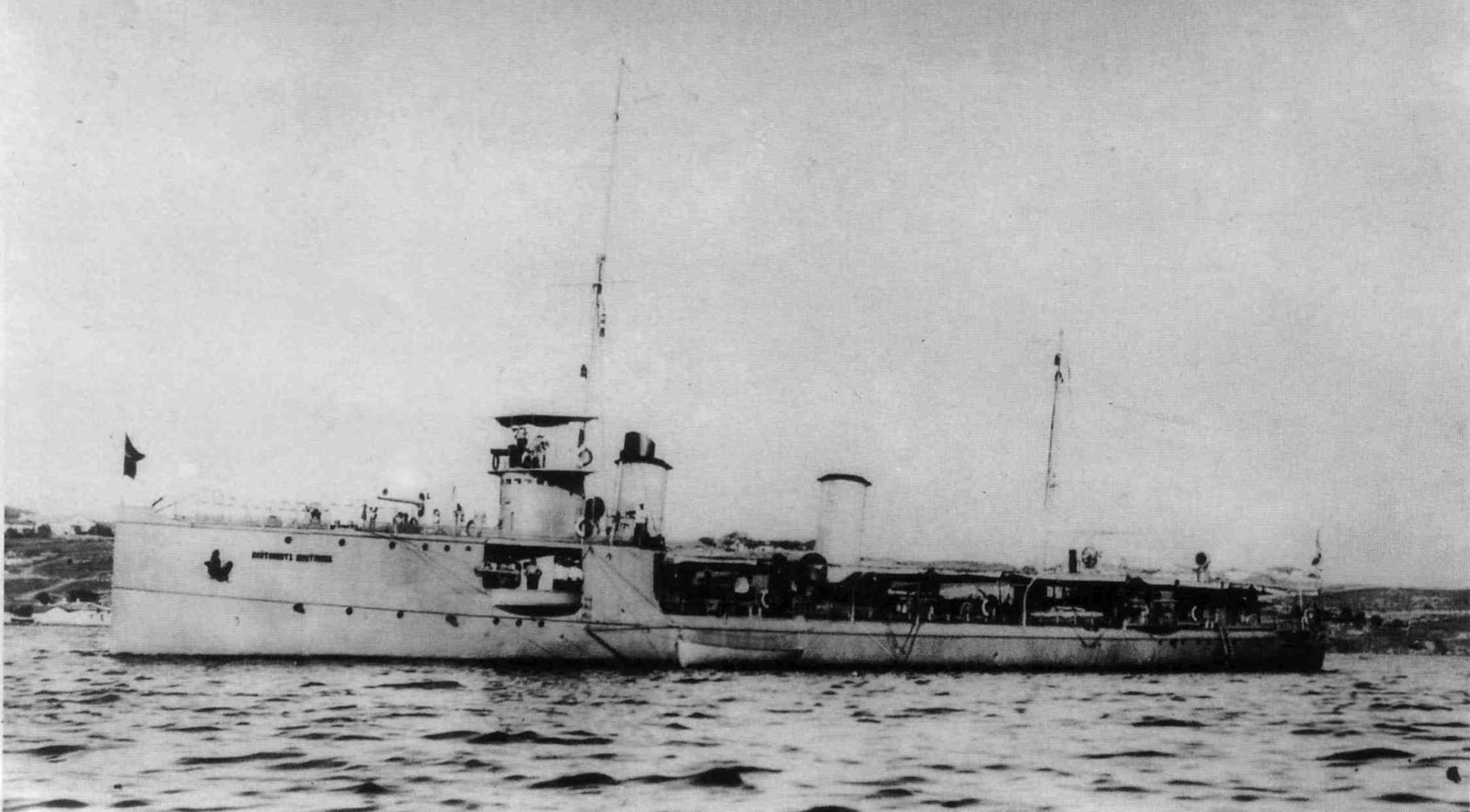

History

Russian Empire
- Name: Leytenant Shestakov
- Laid down: 16 September 1906
- Launched: 28 July 1907
- Completed: 1 October 1909
- Fate: Scuttled, 18 June 1918

General characteristics (as built)
- Class & type: Leytenant Shestakov-class destroyer
- Displacement: 640 long tons (650 t)
- Length: 74.07 m (243.0 ft)
- Beam: 8.28 m (27.2 ft)
- Draft: 2.59 m (8.5 ft)
- Installed power: 4 Normand boilers; 6,500 ihp (4,847 kW)
- Propulsion: 2 shafts; 2 triple-expansion steam engines
- Speed: 25 knots (46 km/h; 29 mph)
- Range: 1,944 nmi (3,600 km; 2,237 mi)
- Complement: 94
- Armament: 1 × single 120 mm (4.7 in) gun; 5 × single 75 mm (3 in) guns; 3 × single 450 mm (17.7 in) torpedo tubes; 40 mines

Leytenant Shestakov (Russian: Лейтенант Шестаков) was a destroyer of the Imperial Russian Navy and the name ship of her class. The ship was built by the Naval Yard, Nikolayev, from 1906 to 1909, being launched on 28 July 1908. The ship served in the Russian Black Sea Fleet during the First World War, passing to control of the Bolsheviks following the October Revolution, but was scuttled on 18 June 1918 to avoid capture by German troops.

== Design and construction ==
The Leytenant Shestakov class was developed to meet a requirement for larger destroyers for the Black Sea Fleet based on experience of the Russo-Japanese War. The basis of the design was the Vsadnik class, a German design being built for the Baltic Fleet, but the new ships were larger and had longer range. Leytenant Zatsarenny was 74.07 m (243 ft 0 in) long overall, with a beam of 8.28 m (27 ft 2 in) and a draft of 2.59 m (8 ft 6 in). Displacement was 640 long tons (650 t). Four coal-fired Normand boilers were fitted, feeding two triple expansion steam engines rated at 6,500 ihp (4,800 kW), which gave a design speed of 25 kn (29 mph; 46 km/h). Two funnels were fitted.

The ship was originally designed to have a gun armament of six 75 mm guns, but was completed with one of the guns replaced by a single 120 mm (4.7 in gun). Three 450 mm (17.7 in) torpedo tubes were fitted, while 40 mines could be carried. After 1909, another 75 mm gun was replaced by a 120 mm gun, while after 1914, the remaining 75 mm guns were replaced by two 47 mm anti-aircraft guns and the mine load increased to 50. The ship had a crew of 94.

Leytenant Shestakov was laid down at the Naval Yard, Nikolayev (now Mykolaiv), Ukraine on 16 September 1906 New Style (NS) (3 September 1906 Old Style (OS)), was launched on 28 July 1907, and entered service with the Black Sea Fleet on 1 October 1909 (NS) (18 September 1909 OS).

== Service ==
Leytenant Shestakov remained part of the Black Sea fleet during the First World War, although the low speed of the Leytenant Shestakovs limited their usefulness. Operations included raids against Turkish communications and bombardment of the Turkish coast, and blockade operations off Turkey and Romania.

Early on 8 January 1916, Leytenant Shestakov and the destroyer Pronzitelny sank the 4,400-gross register ton (GRT) collier Carmen, on passage to Zonguldak to load coal, off Kirpen island. Later that day, the Turkish battlecruiser Yavûz Sultân Selîm, (Note: Yavûz Sultân Selîm was the German battlecruiser Goeben, which had been transferred to Turkey at the beginning of the First World War. Although nominally part of the Turkish navy, Yavûz was still commanded by German officers and manned by a German crew.) which had been tasked to cover Carmen as the collier arrived at Zonguldak, spotted the two destroyers and set off in pursuit. The Russian destroyers signalled the presence of Yavûz by radio, and the Imperatritsa Ekaterina Velikaya intercepted Yavûz, resulting in the action of 8 January 1916, in which the two capital ships briefly exchanged fire. From September 1916, Leytenant Shestakov was deployed in support of the left flank of the Russian-Romanian armies during the Romanian Campaign.

In December 1918, following the October Revolution, Leytenant Shestakov came under control of the Bolshevik Black Sea Fleet. While an Armistice between Russia and the Central Powers was signed on 15 December 1917, hostilities restarted in February 1918, with the Germans advancing deep into Ukraine. The Black Sea Fleet, including Leytenant Shestakov, evacuated from Sevastopol on 14–15 May 1918, just before the Germans took the city, moving to Novorossiysk. On 18 May, with the Germans threatening to continue their attack if the Black Sea Fleet did not return to Sevastapol and be surrendered to German control, Leytenant Shestakov, along with much of the Black Sea Fleet, was scuttled in accordance with orders from Moscow.

The ship was raised on 10 December 1927 and was subsequently scrapped.

== Bibliography ==
- Apalkov, Yu. V. (1996). Боевые корабли русского флота: 8.1914-10.1917г [Combat ships of the Russian fleet: 8.1914-10.1917] (in Russian). Saint Petersburg, Russia: ИНТЕК. ISBN 5-7559-0018-3.
- Berezhnoy, S.S. (2002). Крейсера и Миносцы: Справочик [Cruisers and Destroyers: A Directory] (in Russian). Moscow: Ввоенное Ииздательство. ISBN 5-203-01780-8.
- Budzbon, Przemysław (1985). "Russia". In Gray, Randal (ed.). Conway's All the World's Fighting Ships 1906–1921. Annapolis, Maryland: Naval Institute Press. pp. 291–325. ISBN 0-85177-245-5.
- Campbell, N. J. M. (1979). "Russia". In Chesneau, Roger & Kolesnik, Eugene M. (eds.). Conway's All the World's Fighting Ships 1860–1905. New York: Mayflower Books. pp. 170–217. ISBN 0-8317-0302-4.
- Halpern, Paul G. (1994). A Naval History of World War I. London: UCL Press. ISBN 1-85728-498-4.
