= Leytenant Shestakov-class destroyer =

Early 20th-century Imperial Russian destroyer class

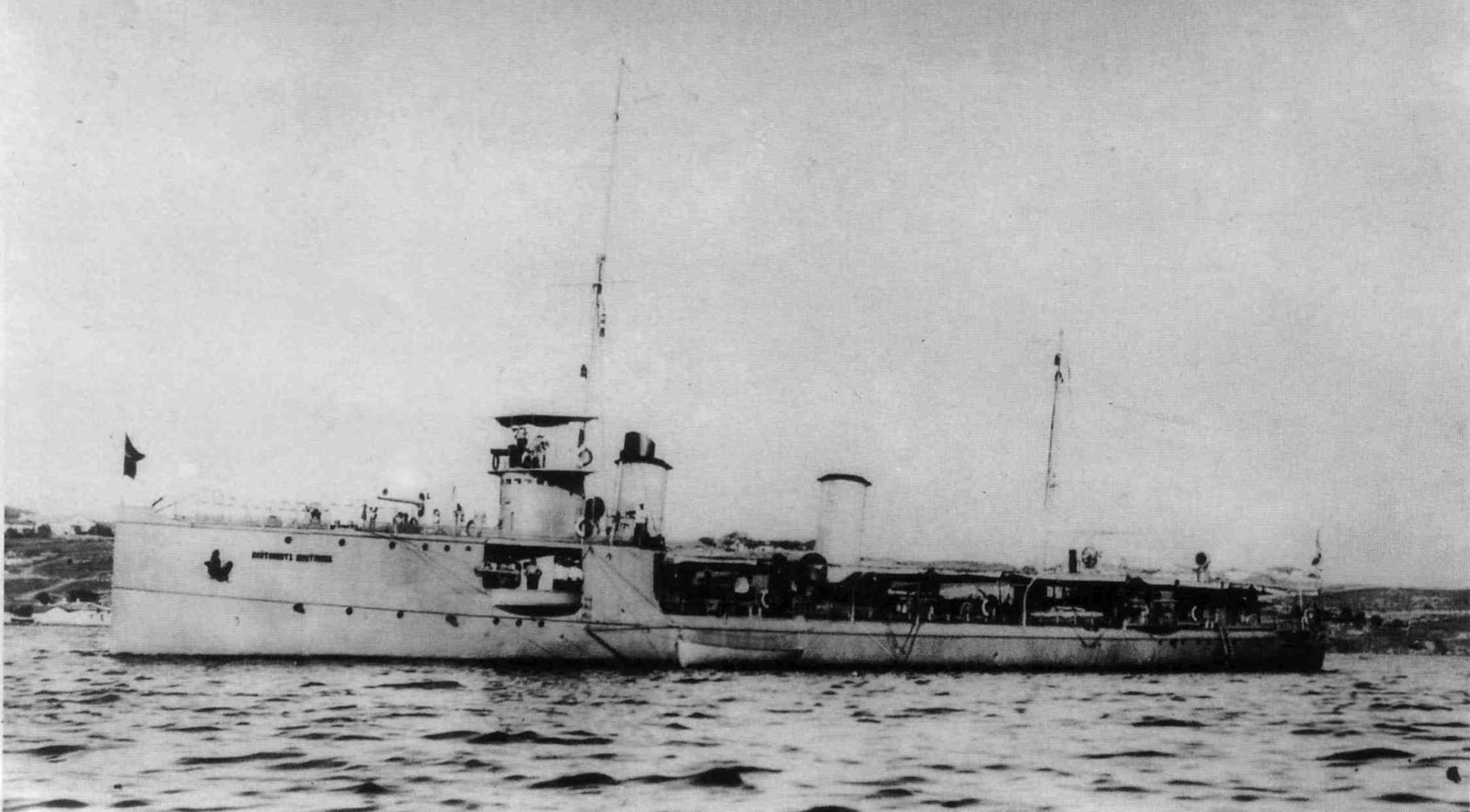
- Leytenant Shestakov

Class overview
- Builders: Naval Shipyard, Nikolayev
- Operators: Imperial Russian Navy; (Russian Soviet Federative Socialist Republic) Red Fleet; Imperial German Navy; (Russia) White Movement
- Preceded by: Leytenant Pushchin class
- Succeeded by: Derzky class
- Built: 1906–1909
- In commission: 1909–1920
- Completed: 4
- Lost: 1
- Scrapped: 3

General characteristics
- Type: Destroyer
- Displacement: 635–850 t (625–837 long tons)
- Length: 74.1 m (243 ft 1 in)
- Beam: 8.3 m (27 ft 3 in)
- Draught: 2.6–3.1 m (8 ft 6 in – 10 ft 2 in)
- Installed power: 4 Normand Boilers; 6,500 ihp (4,800 kW)
- Propulsion: 2 shafts, 2 vertical triple-expansion steam engines
- Speed: 25 knots (46 km/h; 29 mph) (design); 24.2–24.8 knots (44.8–45.9 km/h; 27.8–28.5 mph) (actual)
- Range: 1,700–1,994 mi (2,736–3,209 km) at 12 knots (22 km/h; 14 mph); 310–630 mi (500–1,010 km) at 22 knots (41 km/h; 25 mph)
- Complement: 5 officers; 89 enlisted
- Armament: 1909: 1 × 120 mm (5 in)/45 Pattern 1892 gun; 5 × 75 mm (3 in)/50 Pattern 1892 guns; 4 × 7.62 mm (0.30 in) Maxim machine guns; 3 × 456 mm (18.0 in) torpedo tubes; 40 naval mines; 1915: 2 × 120 mm/45 Pattern 1892 guns; 2 × 47 mm (1.85 in) Hotchkiss AA guns; 4 × 7.62 mm Maxim machine guns; 3 × 456 mm torpedo tubes; 50 naval mines

The Leytenant Shestakov class consisted of four destroyers built for the Imperial Russian Navy. They were an enlarged derivative of the Vsadnik-class destroyers built by the Germany shipyard Friedrich Krupp Germaniawerft. Originally classified as torpedo cruisers, they were redesignated as destroyers on 10 October 1907, (Note: Few references state whether they are using New or Old Style dates. Whenever possible, New Style is used in this article, but some dates are ambiguous.) prior to completion. The ships served as part of the Black Sea Fleet during the First World War and the Russian Civil War. They are often considered a part of the broader Dobrovolets class, which included several similar classes of destroyers.

== Background ==
Originally, the 1903–1923 shipbuilding programme called for additional 350-tonne (340-long-ton) destroyers to be built for the Black Sea Fleet. (Note: Sources agree that the plan was to increase the number of 350-tonne destroyers in the Black Sea Fleet to 20, some claiming 6 ships were planned while others state only 4. However, it seems that there were only 13 such ships in the Black Sea Fleet (4 of the Sokol class and 9 of the Leytenant Pushchin class), so neither number would result in 20.) Experience from the Russo-Japanese War showed the need for larger destroyers, and on 21 November 1904 the Naval Technical Committee (Морской технический комитет, MTK) decided to replace the planned ships with four of a larger type. At the time, the only suitable design available was that of the 570-tonne (560-long-ton) Vsadnik class ordered from Germaniawerft. Four ships based on a modified version of this design were ordered from the Nikolayev Naval Shipyard.

The design process was prolonged due to numerous changes in requirements as it progressed. Design modifications resulted in a significantly increased displacement; the MTK allowed an increase to 605 tonnes (595 long tons), but this was already too low and the displacement continued to climb. Construction of the "enlarged 570 t destroyers" finally began in early 1906. Their names were added to the list of Black Sea Fleet ships on 29 March 1906 and they were officially laid down on 16 September that year.

== Design ==
=== Propulsion ===
As designed, the ships had four Normand boilers providing 6,500 indicated horsepower (4,800 kW) to two vertical triple-expansion steam engines, giving a top speed of 25 knots (46 km/h; 29 mph). A higher speed was hoped for, but, as larger machinery would have come at the cost of increased displacement or reduced range, 25 knots was settled on. They could carry up to 215 tonnes (212 long tons) of coal for fuel.

When Leytenant Shestakov began trials in August 1908, she failed to reach the 25 knot design speed. By May 1909, none of the ships had reached 25 knots even after receiving modifications to their propellers and machinery (Kapitan Saken was the fastest at 24.78 knots (45.89 km/h; 28.52 mph)). The ships' machinery produced between 6,675 and 7,310 hp (4,978 and 5,451 kW).

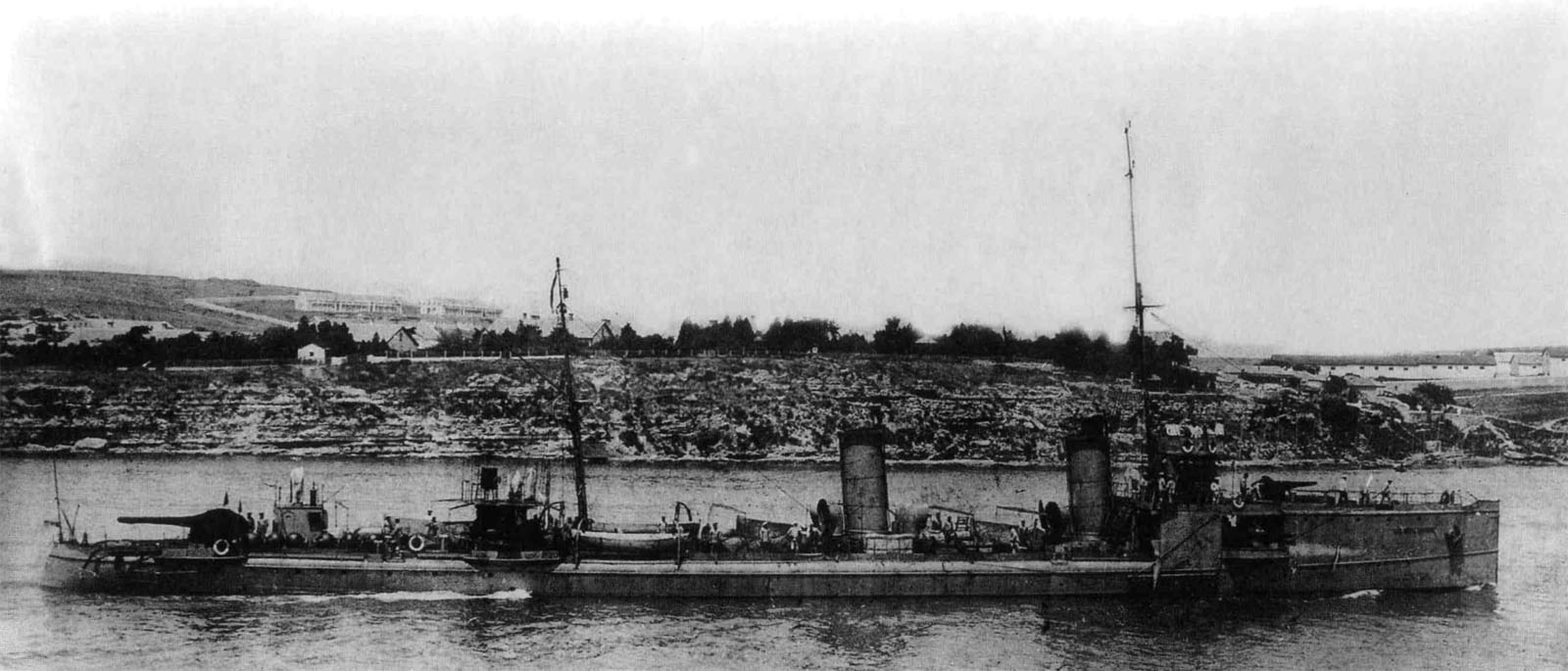
Leytenant Shestakov in an early configuration, showing the larger 120 mm gun at the stern

=== Armament ===
The armament of the ships was based on experience in the Russo-Japanese War, which showed that larger guns were needed to defeat enemy destroyers. The secondary armament of six 57 mm (2.24 in) guns on the Vsadnik class was replaced by four additional 75 mm (3 in) Canet Pattern 1892 for a total of six 75 mm guns; two on the centreline and two on each beam. An unusual design feature carried over from the Vsadniks was the mounting of two guns in sponsons on each side of the forecastle. During construction, replacing the stern 75 mm gun with a 120 mm (5 in) Canet Pattern 1892 was considered and modifications were made to allow this, although the larger guns were not fitted until after the ships had commissioned.

The ships were armed with three 456 mm (18 in) torpedo tubes in single mounts along the centreline, and could carry 40 mines.

==== Modifications ====
In December 1909, the aft 75 mm gun was replaced by a 120 mm gun as planned. The 75 mm guns had their shields removed in December 1910. In 1913–1914, the remaining 75 mm guns were removed, the sponsons eliminated, and a second 120 mm gun mounted on the forecastle. In 1914–1915, the ships received two 47 mm (1.9 in) anti-aircraft guns, and the number of mines they could carry was increased to 50.

== Service ==
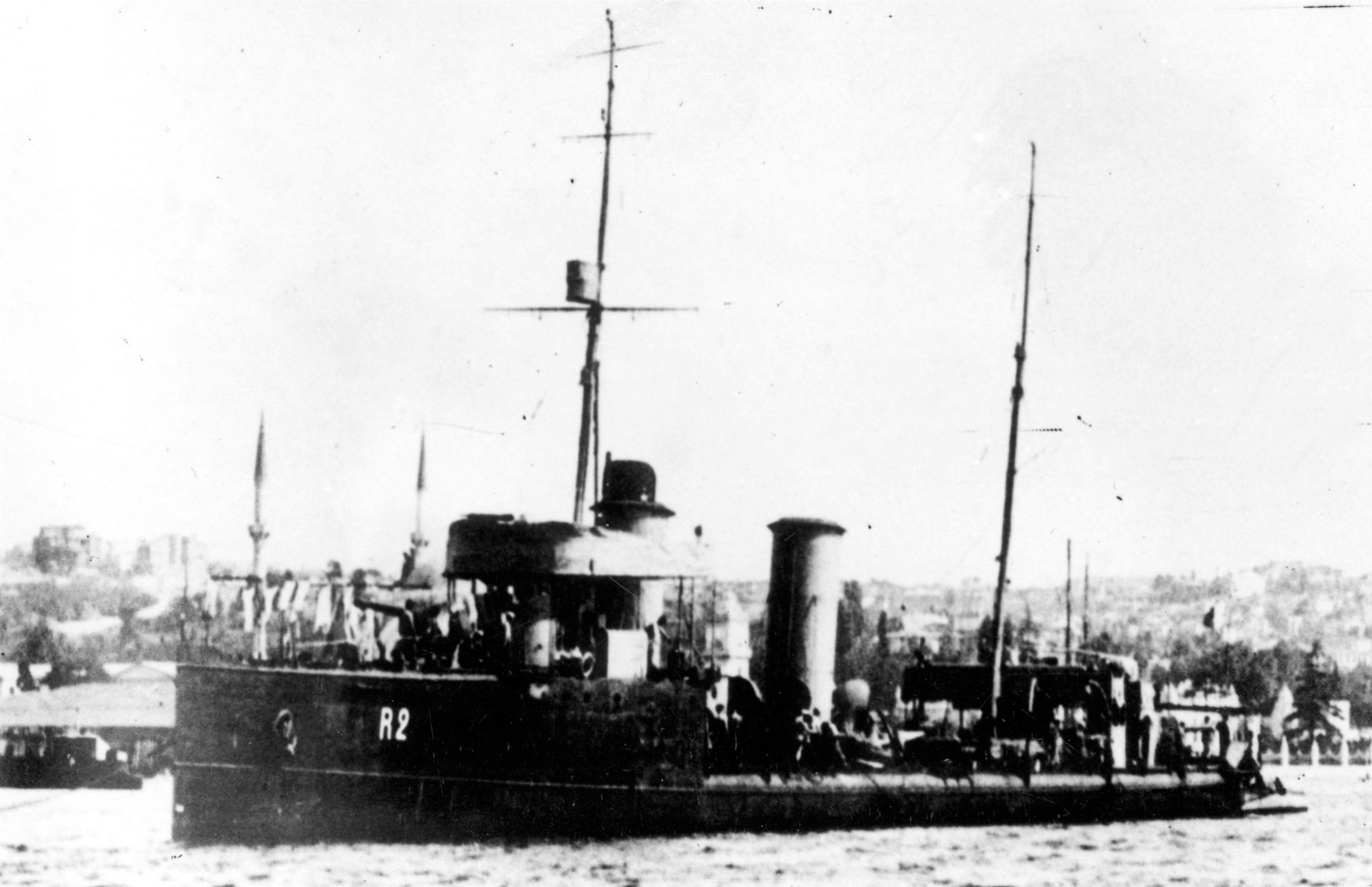
Kapitan Saken in Istanbul, 1919, while under the French flag as R 2

The four destroyers joined the Black Sea Fleet on 25 November 1909, forming the 2nd Division of the Torpedo Brigade. Modifications continued even after the ships entered active service. In August 1911, the 2nd Division became part of the Black Sea Torpedo Division. With the arrival of the new Derzky-class destroyers in 1914, the ships were moved to the 3rd Division.

After the Ottoman Empire entered the First World War on 29 October 1914, the ships were involved in blockading the Turkish coast, participating in raids and minelaying operations. In early 1916, they helped to cover the Trebizond Offensive. In September 1916, they became part of a special detachment tasked with assisting the Romanian Army in Dobruja. Leytenant Zatsarenny was sunk on 30 June 1917 after hitting a mine laid by the Ottoman cruiser Midilli near Snake Island, with the loss of 44 men.

Following the October Revolution, the three surviving ships joined the Red Black Sea Fleet on 29 December 1917. Leytenant Shestakov and Kapitan-leytenant Baranov moved from Sevastopol to Novorossiysk on 29 April 1918 ahead of the advancing German forces. Both were scuttled in Tsemes Bay on 18 June 1918 to avoid capture. In December 1927 they were raised by EPRON and scrapped.

Kapitan Saken was placed in storage in Sevastopol in March 1918. On 1 May, she was captured there by German forces and pressed into service on 12 October as R 04. She was taken over by the Allies after the armistice on 24 November and sent to İzmit before joining the Naval Forces of South Russia in October 1919. She participated in the evacuation of Novorossiysk in March 1920. At the end of 1920, she sailed to be interned in Bizerte with the rest of Wrangel's Fleet and was eventually scrapped in France in the early 1930s.

== Ships ==
All dates given are New Style:

Construction data
Name	Laid down	Launched	Entered Service	Fate
Leytenant Shestakov (Лейтенант Шестаков)	16 September 1906	August 1907	1 October 1909	Scuttled, 18 June 1918 in Tsemes Bay, raised and scrapped, 1927–1928
Kapitan Saken (Капитан Сакен)	16 September 1906	September 1907	13 October 1909	Interned, 29 December 1920 in Bizerte, scrapped, early 1930s
Kapitan-leytenant Baranov (Капитан-лейтенант Баранов)	16 September 1906	5 November 1907	13 October 1909	Scuttled, 18 June 1918 in Tsemes Bay, raised and scrapped, 1927–1928
Leytenant Zatsarenny (Лейтенант Зацаренный)	16 September 1906	29 October 1907	16 October 1909	Sunk, 17 June 1917, after hitting a mine near Snake Island

Originally, Kapitan Saken was to be named Leytenant Pushchin (Лейтенант Пущин), but this was changed in March 1907, with another destroyer (formerly Zadorny) receiving the name instead.

== Bibliography ==
- Budzbon, Przemysław (1985). "Russia". In Gray, Randal (ed.). Conway's All the World's Fighting Ships 1906–1921. Naval Institute Press. pp. 291–325. ISBN 0-85177-245-5.
- Campbell, N. J. M. (1979). "Russia". In Chesneau, Roger & Kolesnik, Eugene M. (eds.). Conway's All the World's Fighting Ships 1860–1905. Mayflower Books. pp. 170–217. ISBN 0-8317-0302-4.
- Watts, Anthony J. (1990). The Imperial Russian Navy. Arms and Armour. ISBN 0-85368-912-1.
- Zubkov, Dmitry (2025). Soviet and Russians Destroyer Exports. Vol. 1: Imperial Russian-Built Destroyers in Service with Foreign Navies, 1904–1954. Helion. ISBN 978-1-804515-58-7.
