= Russian destroyer Leytenant Zatsarenny =

WWI-era Russian destroyer

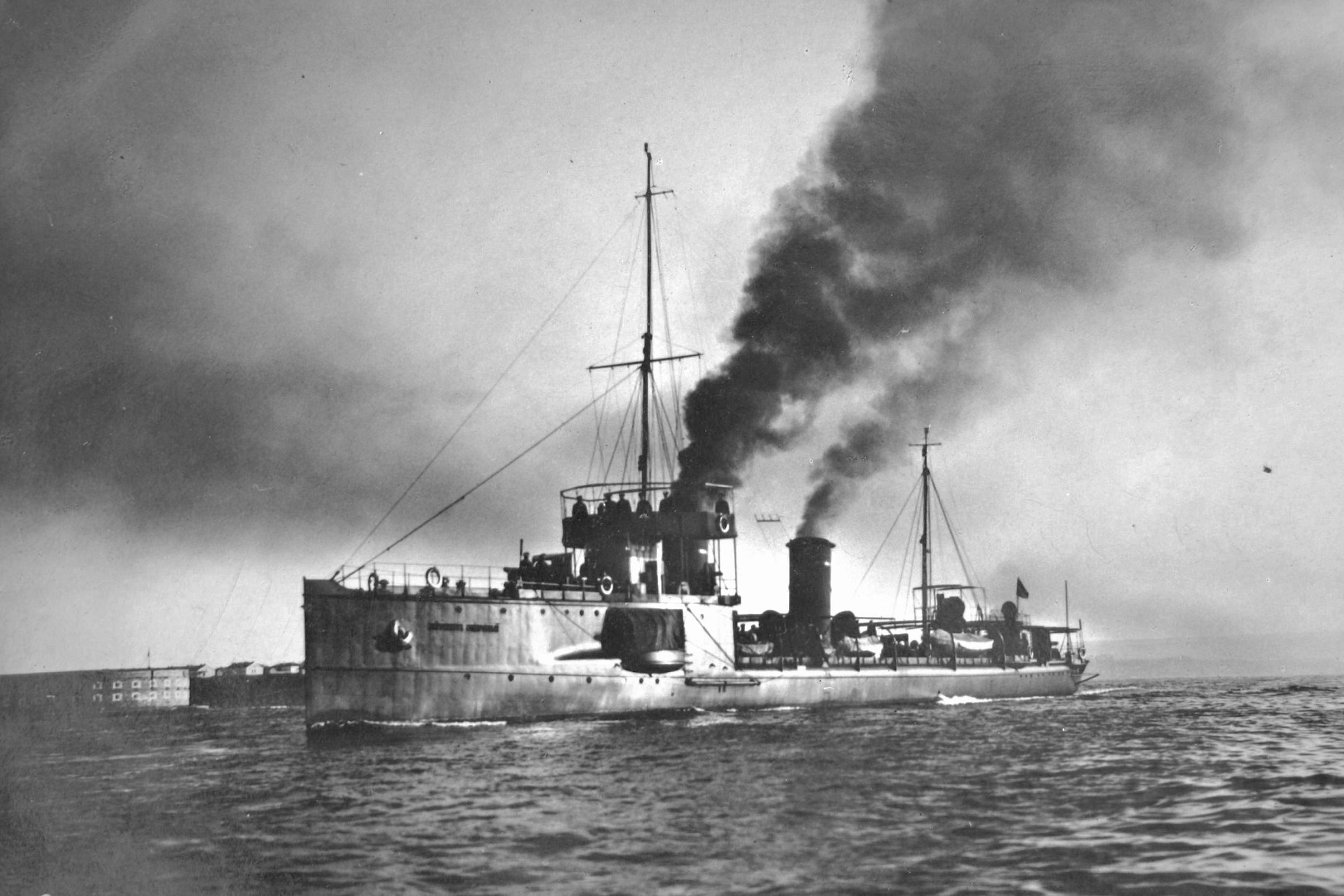
- Leytenant Zatsarennyy in Sevastopol

History

Russian Empire
- Name: Leytenant Zatsarenni
- Laid down: 1905
- Launched: 29 October 1907
- Commissioned: 1908
- Fate: Sunk by mine 30 June 1917

General characteristics
- Class & type: Leytenant Shestakov class
- Displacement: 640 tons
- Length: 74.14 m (243.2 ft)
- Beam: 8.28 m (27.2 ft)
- Draft: 2.74 m (9.0 ft)
- Propulsion: Steam engines, four Normand boilers, two shafts, 6,500 ihp (4,800 kW)
- Speed: 25 knots (46 km/h; 29 mph)
- Range: 1,944 nmi (3,600 km; 2,237 mi)
- Complement: 91
- Armament: 1 × single 120 mm gun; 5 × single 75 mm guns; 3 × single 450 mm (17.7 in) torpedo tubes

Leytenant Zatsarenny (Russian: Лейтенант Зацаренный) was an Imperial Russian Navy destroyer of the four-strong Leytenant Shestakov class (named after Ivan Shestakov (1820–1888)).

Leytenant Zatsarenny herself was named after a torpedo boat captain who had distinguished himself in the Russo-Turkish War of 1877–1878.

She was sunk on 30 June 1917, when she ran onto a German naval mine that had been laid only days before by the Ottoman Navy light cruiser Midilli (formerly the Imperial German Navy′s SMS Breslau). Midilli had laid seventy mines off the mouth of the Danube, followed by another ten off Fidonisi Island, which to the Germans was then known as Schlangen Insel (Snake Island), off Sulina.

Leytenant Zatsarenny was rediscovered in July 2007 by Russian divers.

== Design and construction ==
The Leytenant Shestakov class was developed to meet a requirement for larger destroyers for the Black Sea Fleet based on experience of the Russo-Japanese War. The basis of the design was the Gaidamak class, a German design being built for the Baltic Fleet, but the new ships were larger and had longer range. Leytenant Zatsarenny was 74.07 m (243 ft) long overall, with a beam of 8.28 m (27 ft 2 in) and a draft of 2.59 m (8 ft 6 in). Displacement (ship) was 640 long tons (650 t). Four coal-fired Normand boilers were fitted, feeding two triple-expansion steam engines rated at 6,500 indicated horsepower (4,800 kW), which gave a design speed of 25 knots (46 km/h; 29 mph). Leytenant Zatsarenny reached a speed of 24.28 kn (44.97 km/h; 27.94 mph) during sea trials, but by 1912 this speed had dropped to 22.5 kn (41.7 km/h; 25.9 mph). Two funnels were fitted.

The ship was originally designed to have a gun armament of six 75 mm guns, but was completed with the forward gun replaced by a single 120 mm (4.7 in gun). Three 450 mm (17.7 in) torpedo tubes were fitted, while 40 mines could be carried. After 1909, another 75 mm gun was replaced by a 120 mm gun, while after 1914, the remaining 75 mm guns were replaced by two 47 mm anti-aircraft guns and the mine load increased to 50. The ship had a crew of 91–94.

Leytenant Zatsarenny was laid down at the Naval Yard, Nikolayev (now Mykolaiv), Ukraine, on 3 September 1906 Old Style (OS) (16 September New Style (NS)), and was launched on 16 October 1907 OS, entering service on 3 October 1909 (OS).

== Service ==
Leytenant Zatsarenny remained part of the Black Sea fleet during the First World War, although the low speed of the Leytenant Shestakovs limited their usefulness. Operations included escort operations, support for fleet operations, minelaying, landing sabotage teams and bombarding Turkish fortifications and ports. On 1–6 January 1915 (OS) Leytenant Shestakov, along with other ships, took part in the destruction of the steamer Georgios and three sailing ships off Sinop.

From January to April 1916, Leytenant Zatsarenny took part in the Trebizond Campaign, a Russian land and amphibious offensive that resulted in the capture of the Turkish city of Trabzon. On 2 November (NS) (20 October (OS)) that year, Leytenant Zatsarenny, along with sister ship Kapitan Saken and the destroyer Strogi, carried out a raid against Turkish coastal craft hidden at the mouth of the Terme River, with 20 Turkish barges and sailing craft being captured or destroyed.

Leytenant Zatsarenny was sunk on 17 June 1917 (OS) (30 June NS), when she ran onto a German naval mine that had been laid only days before by the Ottoman Navy light cruiser Midilli (formerly the Imperial German Navy′s SMS Breslau). Midilli had laid seventy mines off the mouth of the Danube, followed by another ten off Fidonisi Island, which to the Germans was then known as Schlangen Insel (Snake Island), off Sulina.

== Bibliography ==
- Apalkov, Yu. V. (1996). Боевые корабли русского флота: 8.1914-10.1917г [Combat ships of the Russian fleet: 8.1914-10.1917] (in Russian). Saint Petersburg, Russia: ИНТЕК. ISBN 5-7559-0018-3.
- Berezhnoy, S.S. (2002). Крейсера и Миносцы: Справочик [Cruisers and Destroyers: A Directory] (in Russian). Moscow: Ввоенное Ииздательство. ISBN 5-203-01780-8.
- Budzbon, Przemysław (1985). "Russia". In Gray, Randal (ed.). Conway's All the World's Fighting Ships 1906–1921. Annapolis, Maryland: Naval Institute Press. pp. 291–325. ISBN 0-85177-245-5.
- Campbell, N. J. M. (1979). "Russia". In Chesneau, Roger & Kolesnik, Eugene M. (eds.). Conway's All the World's Fighting Ships 1860–1905. New York: Mayflower Books. pp. 170–217. ISBN 0-8317-0302-4.
- Fock, Harald (1989). Z-Vor!: Internationale Entwicklung und Kriegseinsätze von Zerstörern und Torpedobooten: 1914 bis 1939. Herford, Germany: Koelers Verlagsgesellschaft mbH. ISBN 3-7822-0207-4.
- Halpern, Paul G. (1994). A Naval History of World War I. London: UCL Press. ISBN 1-85728-498-4.
- Watts, Anthony J. (1990). The Imperial Russian Navy. London: Arms and Armour. ISBN 0-85368-912-1.
