= Action of 8 January 1916 =

- Part of World War I
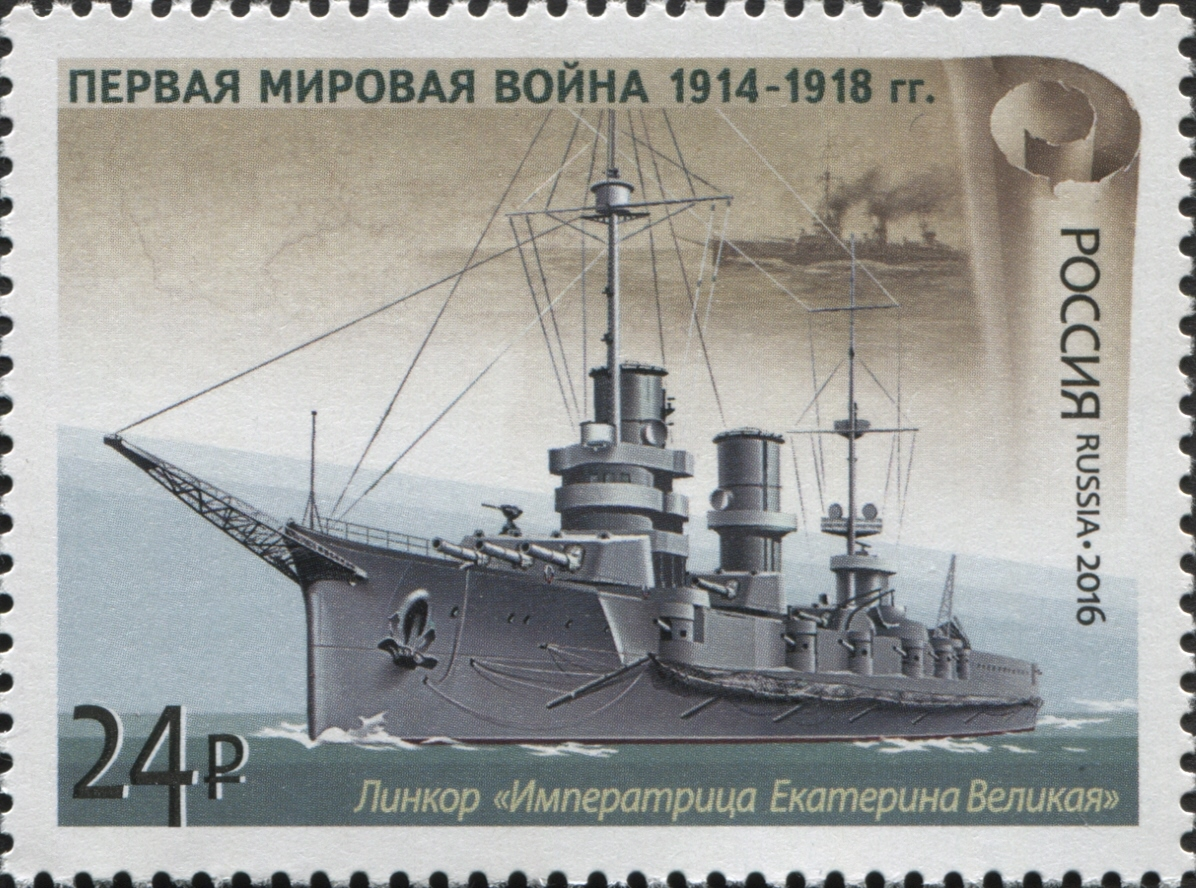
- Russian stamp depicting Imperatritsa Ekaterina Velikaya
Date	8 January 1916
Location	Black Sea
Result	Russian victory

Belligerents
Russian Empire	Ottoman Empire

Commanders and leaders
Andrei Eberhardt	Wilhelm Souchon

Strength
1 battleship 2 destroyers	1 battlecruiser 1 collier

Casualties and losses
None	1 collier sunk 1 battlecruiser damaged

On 8 January 1916 the Russian dreadnought Imperatritsa Ekaterina Velikaya and the Ottoman battlecruiser Yavuz Sultan Selim encountered one another in the Black Sea. After a brief exchange of fire the Ottomans withdrew.

== Battle ==
On 8 January 1916, Yavuz Sultan Selim was scheduled to arrive off of Zonguldak to cover the entrance of the empty 4,400-gross register ton (GRT) collier SS Carmen. Early that morning the collier was intercepted by the Russian destroyers Pronzitelny and Leytenant Shestakov off of Kirpen island and sunk. As she was returning to the Bosporus, Yavuz spotted the two destroyers and gave chase. The destroyers retreated and radioed a warning to the recently commissioned dreadnought Imperatritsa Ekaterina II, which increased speed to come to their aid.

Imperatritsa Ekaterina II opened fire at 18,500 meters (20,200 yd) with her 12-inch guns, forcing Yavuz to turn to the southwest to avoid being struck. The Russian battleship fired 96 rounds and scored no hits, though some near misses did cause splinter damage to the battlecruiser. The Ottomans fired 60 rounds, but couldn't bring their 11-inch guns into range, and withdrew after 30 minutes. The Russians attempted to pursue, but the Yavuz was faster and outran them.

== Aftermath ==
The engagement was the only ever battle between dreadnoughts on the Black Sea. Though the incident was only a minor confrontation, it solidified Russia's naval superiority and deeply troubled Admiral Souchon. Already outnumbered and outclassed in cruisers, destroyers, and torpedo boats, the Ottomans no longer held a dreadnought advantage over the Russian Empire. From then on Russia would continue consolidate its hold on the Black Sea and Yavuz would eventually shift her operations to the Dardanelles.
