= Russian destroyer Kapitan-leytenant Baranov =

WWI-era Russian destroyer

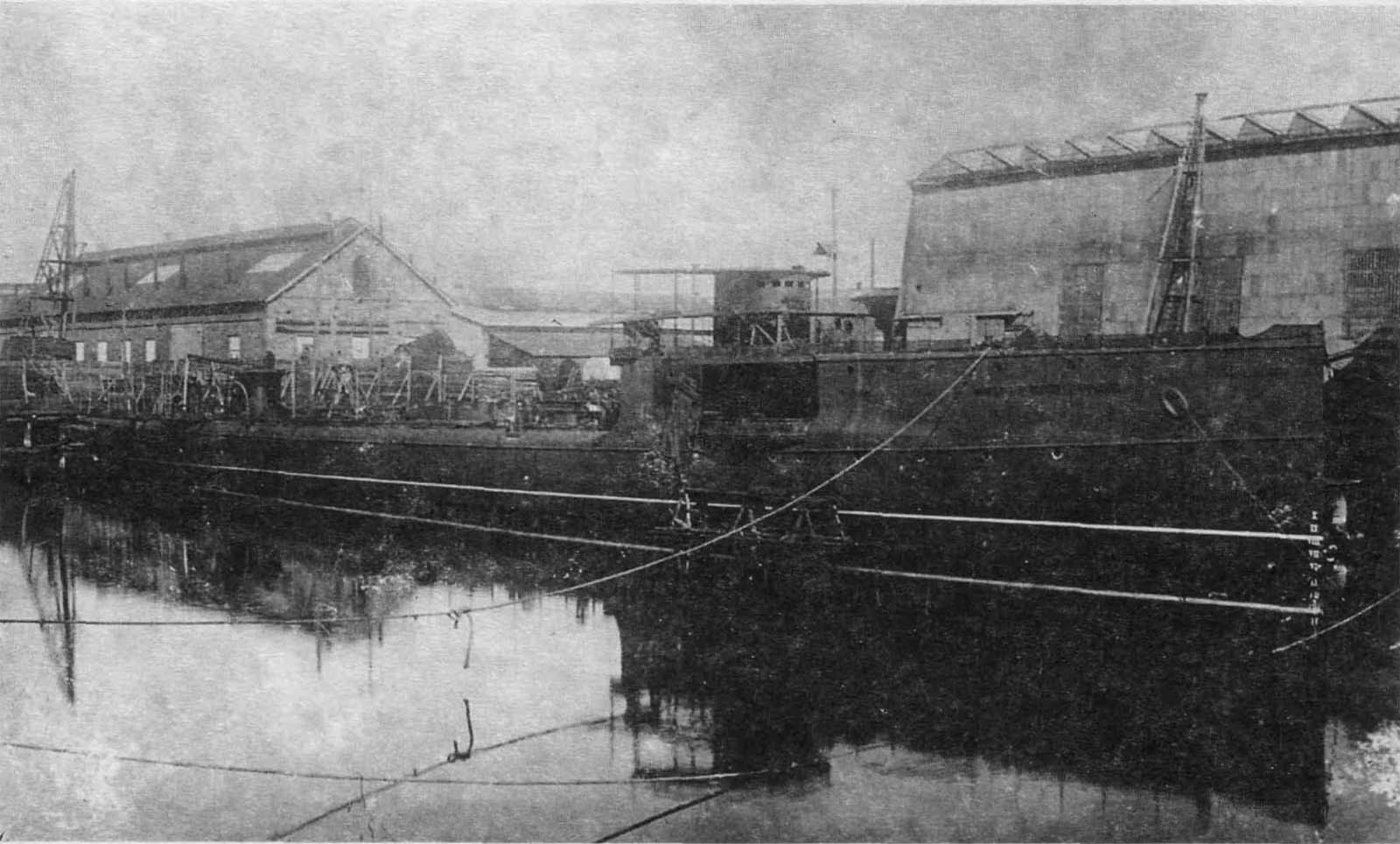

History

Russian Empire
- Name: Kapitan-leytenant Baranov
- Laid down: 3 September 1906
- Launched: 23 October 1907
- Completed: 30 September 1909
- Fate: Scuttled, 18 June 1918

General characteristics (as built)
- Class & type: Leytenant Shestakov-class destroyer
- Displacement: 648 t (638 long tons)
- Length: 74.14 m (243.2 ft)
- Beam: 8.29 m (27.2 ft)
- Draft: 3.05 m (10 ft)
- Installed power: 4 Normand boilers; 6,500 ihp (4,847 kW)
- Propulsion: 2 shafts; 2 triple-expansion steam engines
- Speed: 24 knots (44 km/h; 28 mph)
- Range: 1,440 nmi (2,670 km; 1,660 mi) at 12 knots (22 km/h; 14 mph)
- Complement: 94
- Armament: 1 × single 120 mm (4.7 in) gun; 5 × single 75 mm (3 in) guns; 6 × single 7.62 mm (0.30 in) machine guns; 3 × single 450 mm (17.7 in) torpedo tubes; 40 mines

Kapitan-leytenant Baranov (Russian: Капитан-лейтенант Баранов) was a Leytenant Shestakov-class destroyer built for the Imperial Russian Navy during the first decade of the 20th century. Completed in 1909, she served in the Black Sea Fleet and participated in the First World War. The ship was scuttled in 1918 to prevent her capture by German troops. Her wreck was salvaged in 1926 and subsequently scrapped.

== Design and description ==
The Leytenant Shestakov-class destroyers were enlarged and improved versions of the Gaidamak class. Kapitan-leytenant Baranov displaced 645 metric tons (635 long tons) normal load and 802 metric tons (789 long tons) at deep load. She measured 74.14 meters (243 ft 3 in) long overall with a beam of 8.29 meters (27 ft 2 in), and a draft of 3.05 meters (10 ft 0 in). The ship was propelled by two vertical triple-expansion steam engines, each driving one propeller shaft using steam from four Normand boilers. The engines were designed to produce a total of 6,500 indicated horsepower (4,800 kW) for an intended maximum speed of 25 knots (46 km/h; 29 mph), although the ships were overweight and proved to be slower than estimated. During Kapitan-leytenant Baranov's sea trials, she only reached 24.4 knots (45.2 km/h; 28.1 mph) from 6,674 ihp (4,977 kW). The ship had enough coal to give her a range 1,440 nmi (2,670 km; 1,660 mi) at 12 knots (22 km/h; 14 mph). Her crew numbered 94 officers and men.

The main armament of the Leytenant Shestakov class was intended to consist of two 75-millimeter (3 in) guns, one gun each at the forecastle and stern. Their secondary armament would have included six 57-millimeter (2.2 in) guns, three on each broadside. The ineffectiveness of the 57 mm guns during the Russo-Japanese War of 1904–1905 was realized in January 1906 and the secondary armament was changed to four more 75 mm guns. The forward pair was positioned on a sponson at the main deck level below the forecastle, firing through an embrasure. The forecastle was narrowed to allow the guns to fire directly forward. This installation proved to be very wet, especially at high speeds, and made the guns very difficult to work. The other guns were abreast the rear funnel and the mainmast. All of the guns were fitted with gun shields. They were also fitted with four 7.62 mm (0.30 in) machine guns. The ships were equipped with three 450-millimeter (17.7 in) torpedo tubes in single rotating mounts. The forward mount was located between the funnels while the middle mount was to the rear of the aft funnel and the rear mount was between the mainmast and the stern gun. The ships were equipped to lay 40 mines.

Kapitan-leytenant Baranov was probably completed with a single 120-millimeter (4.7 in) gun replacing her stern gun. All of her 75 mm guns were replaced by another 120 mm gun on the forecastle in 1914. The sponsons were removed and the embrasures were plated over. As a weight-saving measure the gun shields had been removed in 1910.

== Construction and career ==
Kapitan-leytenant Baranov was laid down on 3 September 1906 by the Associated Nikolayev (Naval) Shipyard at its facility in Mykolaiv. The ship was launched on 23 October 1907 and entered service on 30 September 1909. She was scuttled on 18 June 1918 to prevent her capture by German troops. Kapitan-leytenant Baranov was salvaged on 25 December 1926 and subsequently scrapped.

== Bibliography ==
- Apalkov, Yu. V. (1996). Боевые корабли русского флота: 8.1914-10.1917г [Combat ships of the Russian fleet: 8.1914-10.1917] (in Russian). ИНТЕК. ISBN 5-7559-0018-3.
- Berezhnoy, S.S. (2002). Крейсера и Миносцы: Справочик [Cruisers and Destroyers: A Directory] (in Russian). Ввоенное Ииздательство. ISBN 5-203-01780-8.
- Breyer, Siegfried (1992). Soviet Warship Development: Volume 1: 1917–1937. Conway Maritime Press. ISBN 0-85177-604-3.
- Budzbon, Przemysław (1985). "Russia". In Gray, Randal (ed.). Conway's All the World's Fighting Ships 1906–1921. Naval Institute Press. pp. 291–325. ISBN 0-85177-245-5.
- Campbell, N. J. M. (1979). "Russia". In Chesneau, Roger & Kolesnik, Eugene M. (eds.). Conway's All the World's Fighting Ships 1860–1905. Mayflower Books. pp. 170–217. ISBN 0-8317-0302-4.
- Halpern, Paul G. (1994). A Naval History of World War I. UCL Press. ISBN 1-85728-498-4.
- Melnikov, R. M. (1999). Эскадренные миноносцы класса Доброволец [Volunteer-class Destroyers] (in Russian). Ed. Almanac Ships & Battles. OCLC 62741262.
- Watts, Anthony J. (1990). The Imperial Russian Navy. Arms and Armour. ISBN 0-85368-912-1.
