= Russian destroyer Kapitan Saken =

WWI-era Russian destroyer

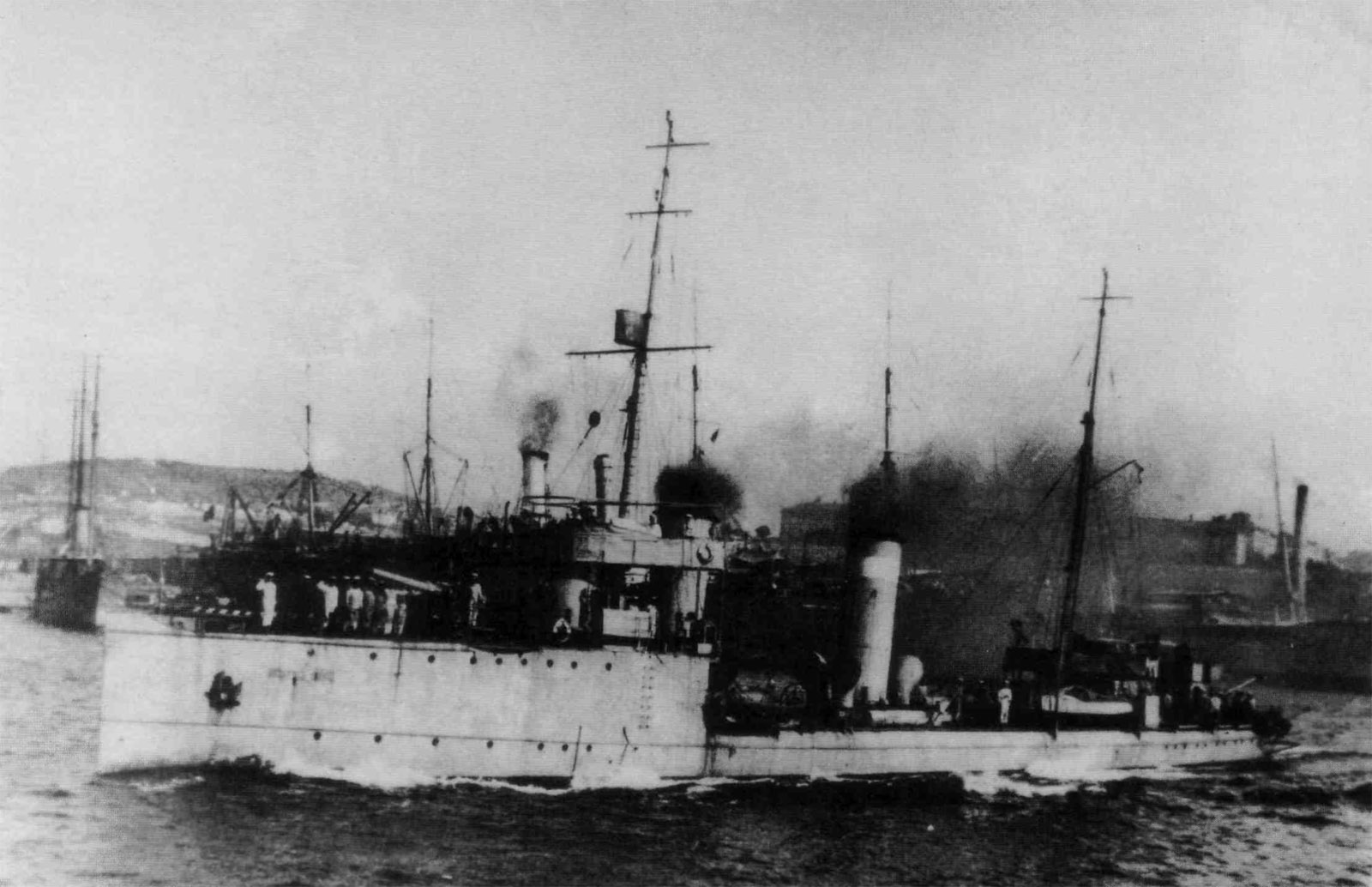

History

Russian Empire
- Name: Leytenant Pushin
- Ordered: 15 June 1905
- Laid down: 24 June 1906
- Launched: 14 September 1907
- Completed: 3 October 1909
- Renamed: Kapitan Saken, 8 April 1907
- Fate: Scrapped, early 1930s

General characteristics (as built)
- Class & type: Leytenant Shestakov-class destroyer
- Displacement: 635 long tons (645 t)
- Length: 74.07 m (243 ft 0 in)
- Beam: 8.31 m (27 ft 3 in)
- Draft: 2.59 m (8 ft 6 in)
- Installed power: 4 Normand boilers; 6,500 ihp (4,847 kW)
- Propulsion: 2 shafts; 2 triple-expansion steam engines
- Speed: 23 knots (43 km/h; 26 mph)
- Range: 1,700 nmi (3,100 km; 2,000 mi) at 12 knots (22 km/h; 14 mph)
- Complement: 94
- Armament: 6 × single 75 mm (3 in) guns; 4 × single 7.62 mm (0.30 in) machine guns; 3 × single 450 mm (17.7 in) torpedo tubes; 40 mines

Kapitan Saken (Russian: Капитан Сакен) was a Leytenant Shestakov-class destroyer built for the Imperial Russian Navy during the first decade of the 20th century. Construction began under the name of Leytenant Pushin (Russian: Лейтенант Пушин), but she was renamed Kapitan Saken in 1907. Completed in 1909, she served in the Black Sea Fleet and participated in the First World War.

== Design and description ==
The Leytenant Shestakov-class destroyers were enlarged and improved versions of the Gaidamak class. Kapitan Saken displaced 635 metric tons (625 long tons) normal load and 802 metric tons (789 long tons) at deep load. She measured 74.07 meters (243 ft 0 in) long overall with a beam of 8.31 meters (27 ft 3 in), and a draft of 2.59 meters (8 ft 6 in). The ship was propelled by two vertical triple-expansion steam engines, each driving one propeller shaft using steam from four Normand boilers. The engines were designed to produce a total of 6,500 indicated horsepower (4,800 kW) for an intended maximum speed of 25 knots (46 km/h; 29 mph), although the ships were overweight and proved to be slower than estimated. During Kapitan Saken's sea trials, she proved to be the fastest ship of the class, even though she only reached 24.78 knots (45.89 km/h; 28.52 mph) from 7,310 ihp (5,450 kW). The ship had enough coal to give her a range 1,700 nmi (3,100 km; 2,000 mi) at 12 knots (22 km/h; 14 mph). Her crew numbered 94 officers and men.

The main armament of the Leytenant Shestakov class was intended to consist of two 75-millimeter (3 in) guns, one gun each at the forecastle and stern. Their secondary armament would have included six 57-millimeter (2.2 in) guns, three on each broadside. The ineffectiveness of the 57 mm guns during the Russo-Japanese War of 1904–1905 was realized in January 1906 and the secondary armament was changed to four more 75 mm guns. The forward pair was positioned on a sponson at the main deck level below the forecastle, firing through an embrasure. The forecastle was narrowed to allow the guns to fire directly forward. This installation proved to be very wet, especially at high speeds, and made the guns very difficult to work. The other guns were abreast the rear funnel and the mainmast. All of the guns were fitted with gun shields. They were also fitted with four 7.62 mm (0.30 in) machine guns. The ships were equipped with three 450-millimeter (17.7 in) torpedo tubes in single rotating mounts. The forward mount was located between the funnels while the middle mount was to the rear of the aft funnel and the rear mount was between the mainmast and the stern gun. The ships were equipped to lay 40 mines.

Kapitan Saken retained her original armament until December 1913 when all of her existing guns were replaced by a pair of 120-millimeter (4.7 in), one on the forecastle and the other at the stern. The sponsons were removed and the embrasures were plated over. As a weight-saving measure the gun shields had been removed in 1910.

== Construction and career ==
Kapitan Saken was laid down on 24 January 1906 by the Associated Nikolayev (Naval) Shipyard at its facility in Mykolaiv with the name of Leytenant Pushin and was renamed on 8 April 1907. The ship was launched in September and entered service on 30 September 1909.

== Bibliography ==
- Apalkov, Yu. V. (1996). Боевые корабли русского флота: 8.1914-10.1917г [Combat ships of the Russian fleet: 8.1914-10.1917] (in Russian). ИНТЕК. ISBN 5-7559-0018-3.
- Berezhnoy, S.S. (2002). Крейсера и Миносцы: Справочик [Cruisers and Destroyers: A Directory] (in Russian). Ввоенное Ииздательство. ISBN 5-203-01780-8.
- Breyer, Siegfried (1992). Soviet Warship Development: Volume 1: 1917–1937. Conway Maritime Press. ISBN 0-85177-604-3.
- Budzbon, Przemysław (1985). "Russia". In Gray, Randal (ed.). Conway's All the World's Fighting Ships 1906–1921. Naval Institute Press. pp. 291–325. ISBN 0-85177-245-5.
- Campbell, N. J. M. (1979). "Russia". In Chesneau, Roger & Kolesnik, Eugene M. (eds.). Conway's All the World's Fighting Ships 1860–1905. Mayflower Books. pp. 170–217. ISBN 0-8317-0302-4.
- Halpern, Paul G. (1994). A Naval History of World War I. UCL Press. ISBN 1-85728-498-4.
- Melnikov, R. M. (1999). Эскадренные миноносцы класса Доброволец [Volunteer-class Destroyers] (in Russian). Ed. Almanac Ships & Battles. OCLC 62741262.
- Watts, Anthony J. (1990). The Imperial Russian Navy. Arms and Armour. ISBN 0-85368-912-1.
- Zubkov, Dmitry (2025). Soviet and Russians Destroyer Exports. Vol. 1: Imperial Russian-Built Destroyers in Service with Foreign Navies, 1904–1954. Helion. ISBN 978-1-804515-58-7.
