= Ivan Aleksandrovich Lebedev =

Russian politician

Ivan Lebedev Russian: Иван Лебедев
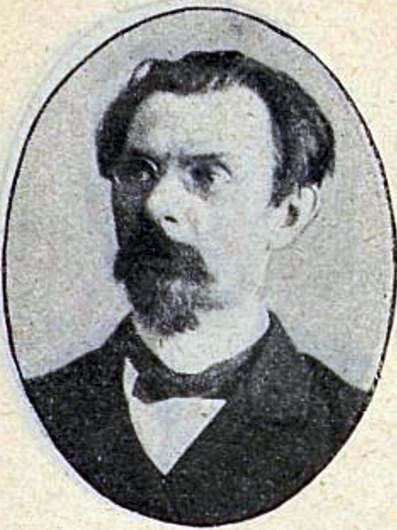
- 1907

Deputy of the Second Imperial Duma
- In office 5 March 1907 – 16 June 1907
- Monarch: Nicholas II

Personal details
- Born: Ivan Aleksandrovich Lebedev; 1856/1861 Arkhangelsk Governorate, Russian Empire
- Died: after 1917
- Party: Socialist Revolutionary Party

Ivan Aleksandrovich Lebedev (Russian: Ива́н Алекса́ндрович Ле́бедев; 1856 or 1861, Arkhangelsk Governorate – after 1917) was a son of an orthodox priest, a member of the Socialist Revolutionary Party, a justice of the peace, and a deputy of the Second Duma of the Russian Empire from the Arkhangelsk Governorate (1907); some sources state that he became a member of the Trudoviks.

== Literature ==
- Николаев, А. Б. (2008). "Лебедев Иван Александрович". Государственная дума Российской империи: 1906—1917 (in Russian). Москва: РОССПЭН. p. 735. ISBN 978-5-8243-1031-3.
- Лебедев (in Russian) // Члены Государственной думы (портреты и биографии): Четвертый созыв, 1912—1917 г. / сост. М. М. Боиович. — Москва: Тип. Т-ва И. Д. Сытина, 1913. — P. 1. — LXIV, 454, [2] p.
