= Russian cruiser Dmitrii Donskoi =

Russian armoured cruiser

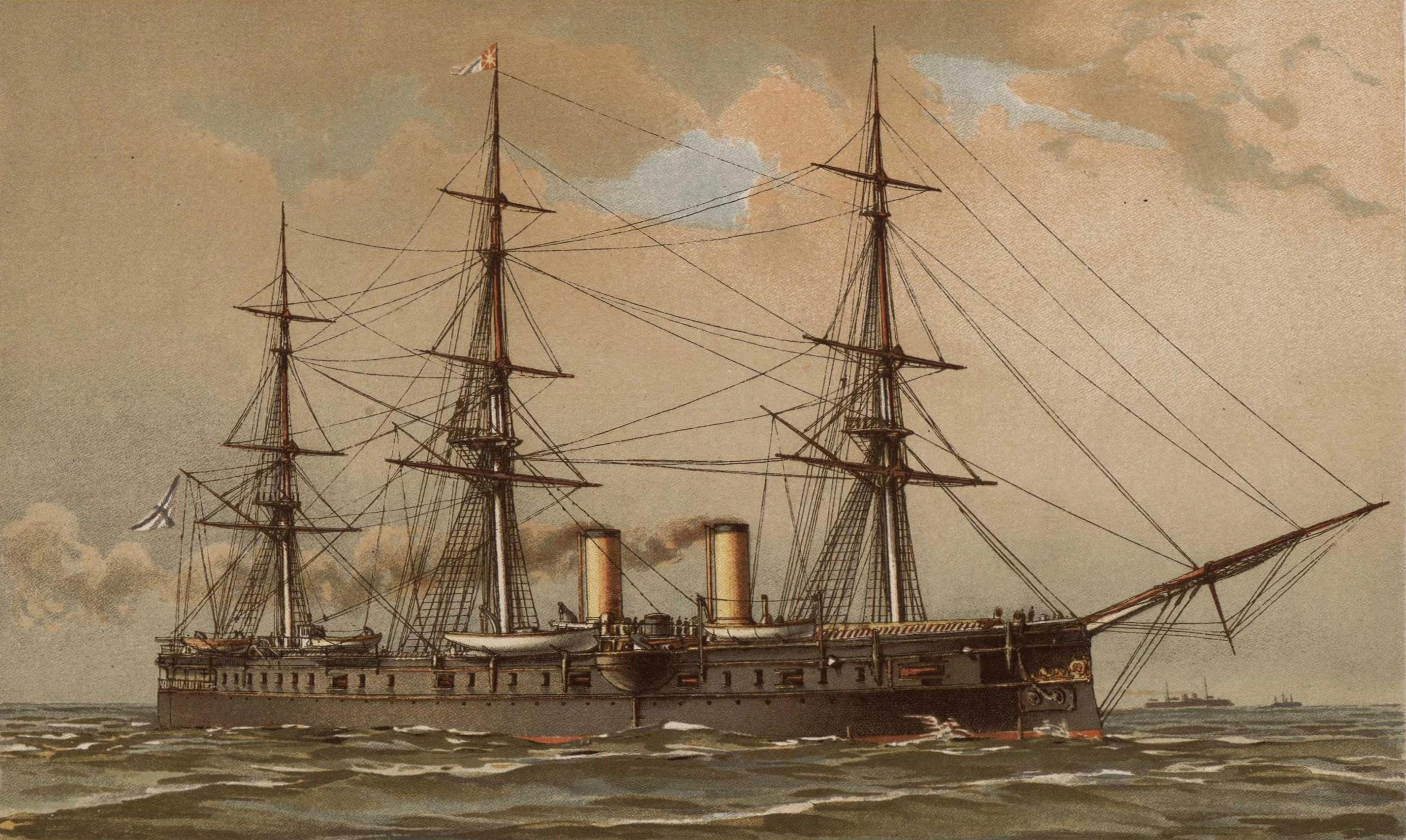
- Dmitrii Donskoi

History

Russian Empire
- Name: Dmitrii Donskoi
- Namesake: Dmitry Donskoy
- Builder: New Admiralty Shipyard, Saint Petersburg
- Cost: 3,421,468 rubles
- Laid down: 21 May 1881
- Launched: 30 August 1883
- Completed: Early 1885
- Stricken: 28 September 1905
- Fate: Scuttled after the Battle of Tsushima, 29 May 1905

General characteristics (as built)
- Type: Armoured cruiser
- Displacement: 5,882 long tons (5,976 t)
- Length: 306 ft 5 in (93.4 m)
- Beam: 58 ft 1 in (17.7 m)
- Draught: 25 ft 10 in (7.88 m)
- Installed power: 7,000 ihp (5,200 kW); 8 cylindrical boilers
- Propulsion: 1 shaft; 2 compound steam engines
- Sail plan: ship rigged
- Speed: 16.5 knots (30.6 km/h; 19.0 mph)
- Range: 7,000 nmi (13,000 km; 8,100 mi) at 10 knots (19 km/h; 12 mph)
- Complement: 591
- Armament: 2 × single 8 in (203 mm) guns; 14 × single 6 in (152 mm) guns; 4 × 15 in (381 mm) torpedo tubes
- Armour: Compound armour; Belt: 9–4.5 in (230–110 mm); Deck: .5 in (13 mm); Barbettes: 12 in (305 mm)

Dmitrii Donskoi (Russian: Дмитрій Донской) was an armoured cruiser built for the Imperial Russian Navy in the early 1880s. She was designed as a commerce raider and equipped with a full suite of sails to economize on coal consumption. The ship spent the bulk of her career abroad, either in the Far East or in the Mediterranean.

Dmitrii Donskoi was assigned to the Second Pacific Squadron after the Japanese destroyed Russian ships deployed in the Far East during the early stages of the Russo-Japanese War of 1904–1905. The squadron was intercepted by the Japanese fleet in May 1905 in the Battle of Tsushima after a lengthy voyage from the Baltic. The cruiser was not seriously damaged during the initial fighting and tried to continue on to Vladivostok after the first day's fighting. She was spotted by several groups of Japanese warships the following day and was badly damaged in the resulting combat. Her captain ordered the crew ashore near Ulleungdo and had Dmitrii Donskoi scuttled offshore.

== Design and description ==
Dmitrii Donskoi was classified as a semi-armoured frigate and was an improved version of her half-sister Vladimir Monomakh. The ship was designed with long endurance and high speed to facilitate her role as a commerce raider. She was laid out as a central-battery ironclad with her armament concentrated amidships. The iron-hulled ship was fitted with a ram and was sheathed in wood and copper to reduce fouling. Her crew numbered approximately 550 officers and men.

The ship was 306 feet 5 inches (93.4 m) long overall. She had a beam of 58 feet 1 inch (17.7 m) and a draught of 25 feet 7 inches (7.8 m). The ship displaced 5,593 long tons (5,683 t) at deep load. Dmitrii Donskoi had a pair of three-cylinder compound steam engines driving a single propeller shaft. Steam was provided by eight cylindrical boilers. The engines were designed to produce 7,000 indicated horsepower (5,200 kW), but produced 6,609 ihp (4,928 kW) during sea trials which gave the ship a maximum speed around 16.5 knots (30.6 km/h; 19.0 mph). The ship normally carried 900 long tons (910 t) of coal which gave her an economical range of 7,000 nautical miles (13,000 km; 8,100 mi) at a speed of 10 knots (19 km/h; 12 mph), but she is known to have loaded 1,625 long tons (1,651 t) in May 1889. She was ship rigged with three masts and had a total sail area of 26,000 square feet (2,400 m^{2}). To reduce drag while under sail, her funnels were retractable. The highest speed that she made solely under sail was 10.5 knots (19.4 km/h; 12.1 mph).

Dmitrii Donskoi was armed with two 30-calibre 8-inch (203 mm) Model 1877 guns, on sponsons on the upper deck between the funnels. The fourteen 28-calibre Model 1877 6-inch (152 mm) guns were mounted in casemates on the main deck. Anti-torpedo boat defence was provided by a number of nine-pounder (42 mm (1.7 in)), four-pounder (34 mm (1.3 in)) and 37 mm (1.5 in) five-barreled revolver Hotchkiss guns. (Note: Sources disagree on the numbers of each weapon at any time.) The ship was also equipped with four above-water 15-inch (381 mm) torpedo tubes.

The ship's waterline belt was composed of compound armour and extended the full length of the ship. It was six inches thick amidships, but reduced to 4.5 inches (114 mm) at the ship's ends. It extended 2 feet (0.6 m) above the waterline and 5 feet (1.5 m) below. Transverse bulkheads 3–4 inches (76–102 mm) thick protected the guns in the battery from raking fire. The sponsons of the 8-inch guns were equally thick. The protective deck was 0.5-inch (13 mm) thick.

== Service ==
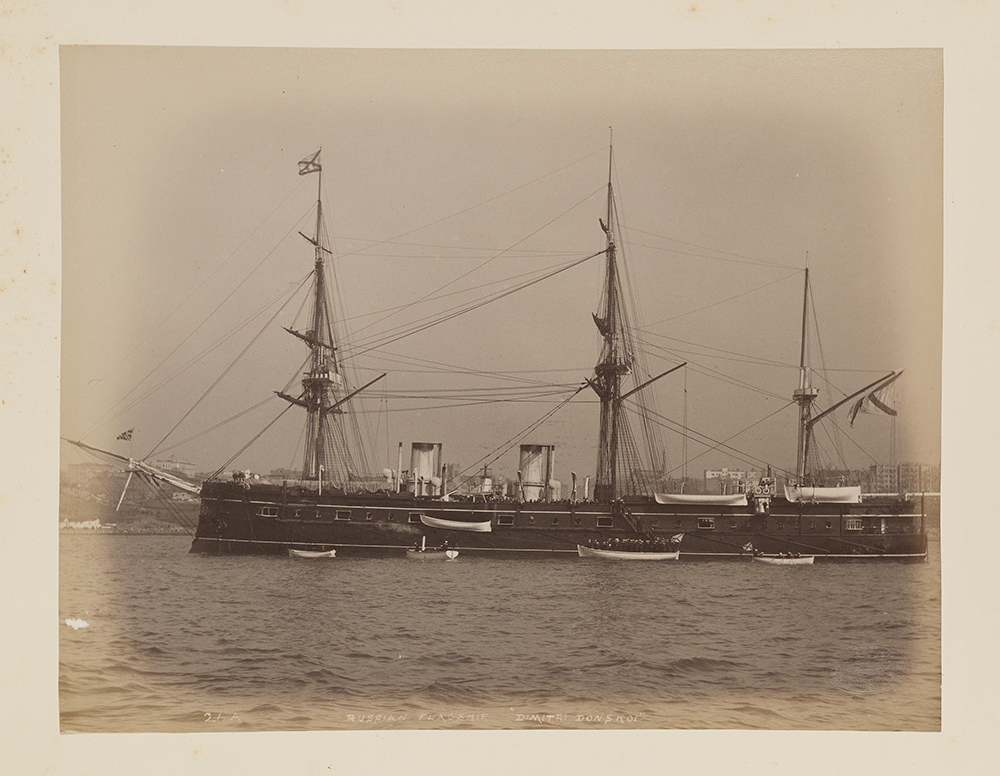
Russian flagship 'Dimitri Donskoi', World's Columbian Exposition, New York, 1893

Construction began on Dmitrii Donskoi on 22 September 1880, (Note: All dates used in this article are New Style) at the New Admiralty Shipyard in St. Petersburg, and the keel-laying ceremony was held on 21 May 1881. She was launched on 30 August 1882 and completed in early 1885. The ship's total cost was 3,421,468 rubles. She was named after Dmitry Donskoy, Grand Duke of Moscow.

She sailed to the Mediterranean on 8 August 1885 and remained there until she arrived at Port Said on 6 March 1887 en route to the Far East. Dmitrii Donskoi reached Nagasaki, Japan, on 19 May and remained in Japanese waters for several months. The ship arrived at Vladivostok on 20 July and accidentally grounded on 12 October whilst conducting torpedo practice. Only lightly damaged, she was refloated the following day. Dmitrii Donskoi wintered in Japan that year and made port visits to Chefoo and Shanghai in February 1888. She was refitted in Yokohama before she began her return to the Baltic on 20 January 1889. The ship was inspected by Tsar Alexander III after her arrival at Kronstadt on 12 June. She began a lengthy overhaul in preparation for her next foreign cruise shortly afterwards.

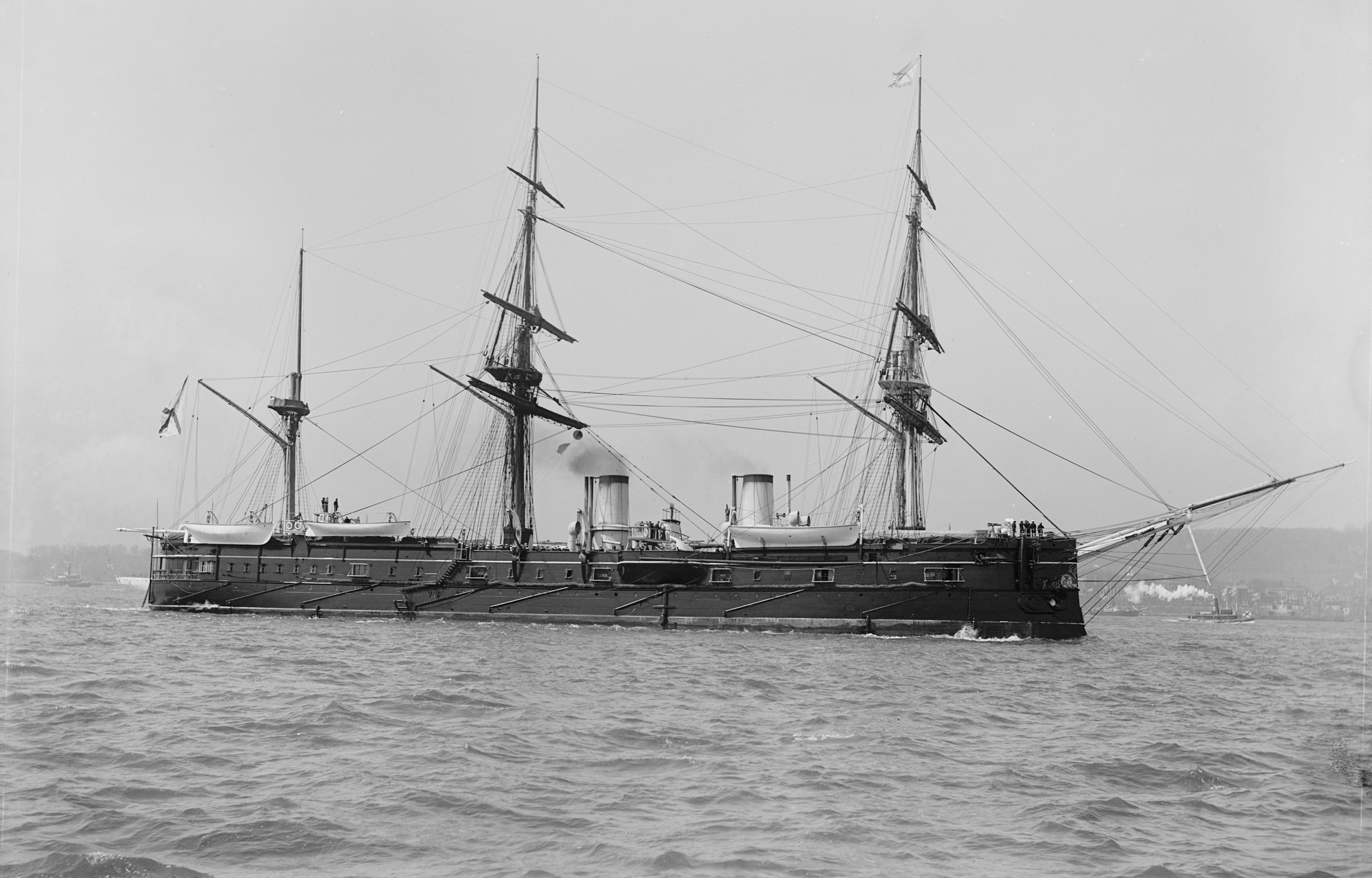
Dmitrii Donskoi at the Columbian Exposition, 1893

Dmitrii Donskoi began her second foreign cruise on 3 October 1891 when she sailed for the Mediterranean, visiting Brest, France en route. She was reclassified as a cruiser of the first rank on 13 February 1892 and remained in the Mediterranean for another month or so. The ship reached Vladivostok on 29 June, stopping at Aden, Singapore, and Hong Kong en route. Dmitrii Donskoi served as the flagship of Rear Admiral Tirtov several times during the year. She spent the winter in Yokosuka and Nagasaki before she sailed in early 1893 to America for a goodwill visit to mark the 400th anniversary of America's discovery. In Algiers in March, the ship picked up Grand Duke Alexander Mikhailovich of Russia and became flagship of Rear Admiral Kaznakov who commanded all the Russian ships at the exhibition. Dmitrii Donskoi reached New York City on 25 April and participated in the Presidential Review two days later. She made port visits to Philadelphia, Boston and Newport, Rhode Island before she arrived back at Kronstadt in early September.

During the ship's lengthy 1893–95 refit, she was rearmed with six 45-calibre six-inch guns, ten 45-calibre 4.7-inch (120 mm) guns, and six 47-millimetre (1.9 in) guns. Her boilers may have been replaced at this time and her sailing rig was replaced by three pole masts. Wilgelm Vitgeft was appointed as the ship's captain in late 1895 and Dmitrii Donskoi began her voyage to the Far East on 10 November. She was one of the Russian ships that occupied Port Arthur in March 1898 and participated in suppressing the Boxer Rebellion in mid-1900. The ship was ordered home in late 1901. Dmitrii Donskoi was refitted again upon her arrival and six of her 4.7-inch guns were replaced by six 75-millimetre (3.0 in) guns and two additional 47 mm guns.

After the completion of her refit, she escorted a group of seven destroyers and five torpedo boats to the Mediterranean in October 1903 where they were assigned to the Mediterranean Squadron under the command of Rear Admiral Virenius. The Naval Staff decided to reinforce the Pacific Squadron with the Mediterranean Squadron in December, but its departure was delayed by repairs to the battleship Oslyabya after it had grounded. When the Russo-Japanese War began in February 1904, the squadron was in the Red Sea and was recalled to the Baltic lest it be caught and destroyed en route by the Japanese.

=== Sinking ===
Dmitrii Donskoi was assigned to the cruiser force of the Second Pacific Squadron and departed Libau on 15 October 1904 bound for Vladivostok with Captain 1st Rank Ivan Lebedev in command. En route in the North Sea, she was damaged by friendly fire from seven sister ships in mistake for a Japanese vessel during the Dogger Bank Incident of 21/22 October. The ship passed the Cape of Good Hope on 20 December. Whilst approaching the Strait of Tsushima on 27 May 1905, the Russian force was intercepted by the Japanese in the Battle of Tsushima. The cruiser was assigned to defend the transport ships at the rear of the Russian formation and was not seriously engaged during the day.

She became separated from the rest of the fleet during the early evening and attempted to steam north to Vladivostok through the Japanese fleet. Dmitrii Donskoi was unsuccessfully attacked by Japanese destroyers and torpedo boats during the night. The following morning, she helped to transfer the badly wounded squadron commander, Vice Admiral Zinovy Rozhestvensky, from the destroyer Buinyi to the destroyer Biedovi and then was forced to scuttle Buinyi when the destroyer's machinery broke down. The destroyer's crew as well as some 205 survivors from Oslyabya were transferred to the cruiser before Buinyi was scuttled.

As the ship sailed northward, she was spotted late in the day by several groups of Japanese ships and badly damaged in the ensuing combat. Captain Lebedev decided to run his ship aground on Ulleungdo, but the ship anchored instead and all of the men aboard were taken to the island. Roughly 60 men of the ship's crew had been killed and another 120 wounded during the fighting. The next morning, 29 May, Dmitrii Donskoi was scuttled about a 1.5 nautical miles (2.8 km; 1.7 mi) offshore at approximately 37°30′N 130°57′E. The survivors were taken prisoner that afternoon by landing parties from the destroyer Fubuki and the armed merchant cruiser Kasuga Maru.

== Shipwreck ==
In 2000, the Korea Ocean Research and Development Institute, contracted in 1999 by Dong Ah Construction Industrial Co., South Korea's fifth-largest construction company, was rumoured to have found the shipwreck of Dmitrii Donskoi. A month beforehand, the company had gone into receivership, but was allowed to continue trading shares. Its share price rose by 41% in one week on media reports that 14,000 tons of gold (10% of all the gold ever mined on Earth) were on board the ship, but they never raised anything from the sea, and the company went bankrupt.

South Korea's Institute of Ocean Science and Technology claims to have discovered the wreck in 2003 and has photographs dating from 2007 on its website.

=== Shinil Group ===
In July 2018, the Shinil Group, a South Korean treasure hunting company, announced it had found Dmitrii Donskoi 1,400 feet (430 m) below the surface, 1 mile (1.6 km) off the South Korean island of Ulleungdo. Under the group's plan, a Chinese salvage company would attempt to retrieve the 5,500 boxes of gold bullion and 200 tons of gold coins, altogether worth £101.3 billion (c. US$133 billion), which they believed to be inside the wreck. Half of the gold would be given back to Russia.

The company, founded in June 2018, had not applied to South Korea's Ministry of Maritime Affairs and Fisheries for the salvage rights. No evidence was offered by Shinil Group for the ship carrying any gold when it sank. South Korea's financial regulator warned the public against investing money in treasure hunting ventures. Park Sung-jin, a spokesman for Shinil Group, said that a cryptocurrency exchange website purporting to be theirs was fake.

A representative of the Central Naval Museum in Saint Petersburg said there was no evidence to support the claim of gold in the Dmitrii Donskoi's wreck.

On 26 July, the group changed its name to Shinil Marine Technology and publicly withdrew its claims about Dmitrii Donskoi, having raised an estimated US$53 million in funds. A Singapore-based cryptocurrency exchange, Shinil Group PTE, from which Shinil Marine Technology had tried to distance itself, said that 124,000 pre-sale investors were signed up and the value of a coin was expected to rise by 25,000%. South Korean police launched a fraud investigation and imposed travel bans on heads of the Korean firm. A South Korean court found the vice chairman of the group guilty of fraud and sentenced him to a five-year prison term, along with a key accomplice. The former chairman of the group received a two-year prison sentence.
