= Ivan Lebedev =

Russian naval officer (1850–1905)

Ivan Lebedev Иван Лебедев
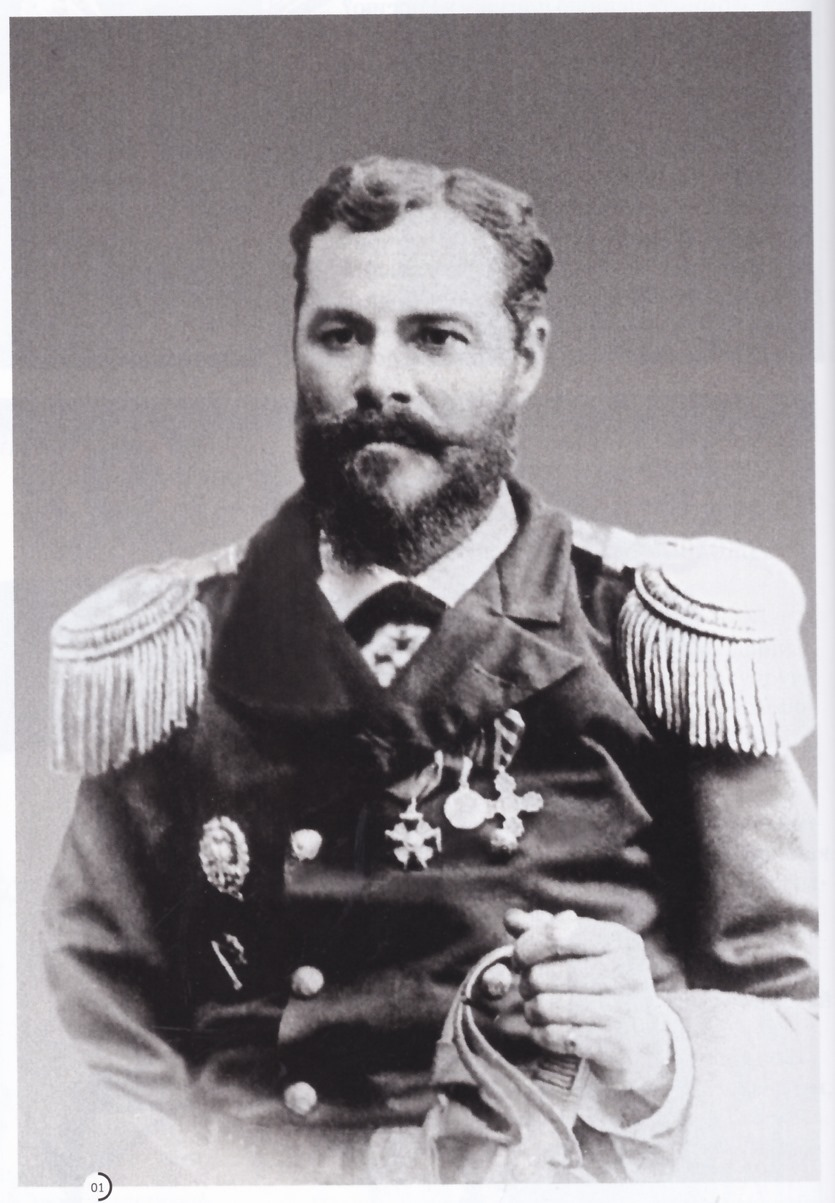
- Born: 12 August 1850; Unknown
- Died: 3 June 1905 (aged 54) (Note: 20 May in the Julian calendar) Sasebo, Nagasaki Prefecture, Empire of Japan
- Buried: Kirishi, Leningrad Oblast, Russia
- Allegiance: Russia
- Branch: Imperial Russian Navy
- Service years: 1867–1872; 1875–1905
- Rank: Captain 1st rank
- Commands: Dmitrii Donskoi
- Conflicts: Russo-Japanese War; Battle of Tsushima
- Education: Naval Cadet Corps

Ivan Nikolaevich Lebedev (1850–1905) was a Russian naval officer who held the rank of Captain 1st Rank. He served in the Russo-Japanese War and is best known for commanding the armored cruiser Dmitrii Donskoi during the Battle of Tsushima. Lebedev died on 3 June 1905 in Sasebo, Japan, following the ship's scuttling after the battle.

== Biography ==
On 14 September 1867, Lebedev enrolled in the Naval Cadet Corps. He entered active service on 17 April 1868 and was promoted to Garde de la Marine on 17 April 1871. From 1871 to 20 May 1872 he served in the 15th and 8th Naval Crews. Holding the rank of lieutenant, he was dismissed from the navy on 20 May 1872. Around this period he attempted to study at the Saint Petersburg State Institute of Technology while earning a living through translation and tutoring, but he was expelled after attempting to take an examination in place of a friend. He subsequently worked for the Novotorzhskaya Railway and later supervised a blacksmith workshop in Odessa.

In 1875 he re-enlisted as a Garde de la Marine and was assigned to the 2nd Naval Crew in the Black Sea. He was promoted to aspirant on 30 August 1875. During the Russo-Turkish War, he served as the military commander of Odessa (24 May 1878). He served aboard Duma from 22 June to 22 September 1878 and was promoted to lieutenant on 1 January 1880. He completed his officer training at the Naval Cadet Corps on 13 November 1880.

Lebedev served as a mine officer on the Vitse-admiral Popov, commanded the destroyers Mackerel (from 20 February 1882) and Sultanka, and later served as junior mine officer on Pamyat Merkuriya (23 September 1883) and Novgorod (23 September 1884). He returned to Vitse-admiral Popov on 23 September 1884. On 1 April 1885 he was appointed senior officer aboard the Bulgarian yacht Alexander the First, returning to Russian service on 14 October 1885.

From 18 January to 18 April 1886 he served as a mine officer aboard the Zabiyaka, and in March 1887 he transferred to the Russian Siberian Flotilla, where he commanded destroyer No. 76 (30 March 1887). From 8 November 1887 to 26 April 1888 he commanded the 6th Naval Crew while also attending specialist mine courses. On 23 April 1888 he was appointed head of the destroyer detachment and took command of the Bobr (4 October 1888). He was assigned to oversee apprentice miners and divers from 28 October 1888. From 16 February 1889 to 1 October 1890 he commanded the Yanchikhe. After a temporary transfer to the Black Sea Fleet (11 September 1890), he returned to the Siberian Flotilla on 24 November 1890.

He commanded the Dzhim Gamil'ton L’yuis from 17 August to 10 October 1891 in patrol operations from the Bering Islands to Vladivostok, then briefly commanded the Tunguz. On 10 November 1891 he assumed command of the Aleut, and later the destroyer Nargen.

Lebedev was promoted to captain 2nd rank on 1 January 1893 and served on the Provisional Naval Court beginning 30 June 1893. He returned to Yanchikhe on 31 July 1893 and later served aboard the Korietz (8 September 1893 – 26 March 1895). He rejoined the Zabiyaka on 6 December 1895 and became assistant adjutant commander of Vladivostok on 16 December 1896. On 17 November 1897 he commanded the Oprichnik and supervised construction of the Forel-class destroyers in France.

He was promoted to Captain 1st rank on 1 January 1901 and took command of the Oleg upon its completion, later assuming command of the Dmitrii Donskoi in 1904, with which he sailed to participate in the Battle of Tsushima. He was severely wounded during the battle and died on 3 June 1905 at Sasebo.

== Awards ==
- Order of St. Anna, 3rd Class
- Order of St. Anna, 2nd Class

=== Foreign Awards ===
- Romania: Crossing the Danube Cross
