= Russian battleship Tri Sviatitelia =

Russian pre-dreadnought battleship

- Tri Sviatitelia at anchor

Class overview
- Name: Tri Sviatitelia
- Operators: Imperial Russian Navy
- Preceded by: Navarin
- Succeeded by: Sissoi Veliky
- Built: 1891–1896
- In commission: 1896–1923
- Completed: 1
- Scrapped: 1

History

Russian Empire
- Name: Tri Sviatitelia (Russian: Три Святителя)
- Namesake: Three Holy Hierarchs
- Operator: Imperial Russian Navy
- Builder: Nikolayev Dockyard
- Laid down: 15 August 1891 (Note: All dates used in this article are New Style)
- Launched: 12 November 1893
- Completed: 1896
- Stricken: 21 November 1925
- Fate: Scrapped, 1923

General characteristics
- Type: Pre-dreadnought battleship
- Displacement: 13,318 long tons (13,532 t)
- Length: 378 ft (115.2 m)
- Beam: 73 ft 3 in (22.3 m)
- Draught: 28 ft 6 in (8.7 m)
- Installed power: 14 fire-tube boilers; 10,600 ihp (7,904 kW)
- Propulsion: 2 shafts, 2 triple expansion steam engines
- Speed: 16.5 knots (30.6 km/h; 19.0 mph)
- Range: 2,250 nmi (4,170 km; 2,590 mi) at 10 knots (19 km/h; 12 mph)
- Complement: 730
- Armament: 2 × twin 12 in (305 mm) guns; 8 × single 6 in (152 mm) guns; 4 × single 4.7 in (119 mm) guns; 10 × single 47 mm (1.9 in) guns; 40 × single 37 mm (1.5 in) guns; 6 × 15 in (381 mm) torpedo tubes
- Armour: Harvey armour; Belt: 16–18 in (406–457 mm); Deck: 2–3 in (51–76 mm); Turrets: 16 in (406 mm); Conning tower: 12 in (305 mm); Bulkheads: 14–16 in (356–406 mm)

Tri Sviatitelia (Russian: Три Святителя, meaning the Three Holy Hierarchs) was a pre-dreadnought battleship built for the Imperial Russian Navy during the 1890s. She served with the Black Sea Fleet and was flagship of the forces pursuing the mutinous battleship Potemkin in June 1905. During World War I the ship encountered the German battlecruiser SMS Goeben (formally Yavuz Sultan Selim) twice, but never hit the German ship, nor was she damaged by her. From 1915 onward she was relegated to the coast bombardment role as she was the oldest battleship in the fleet. Tri Sviatitelia was refitting in Sevastopol when the February Revolution of 1917 began and she was never operational afterwards.

Tri Sviatitelia was captured when the Germans took the city in May 1918 and was turned over to the Allies after the Armistice in November 1918. Her engines were destroyed in 1919 by the British when they withdrew from Sevastopol to prevent the advancing Bolsheviks from using her against the White Russians. She was abandoned when the Whites evacuated the Crimea in 1920 and was scrapped in 1923.

== Design ==
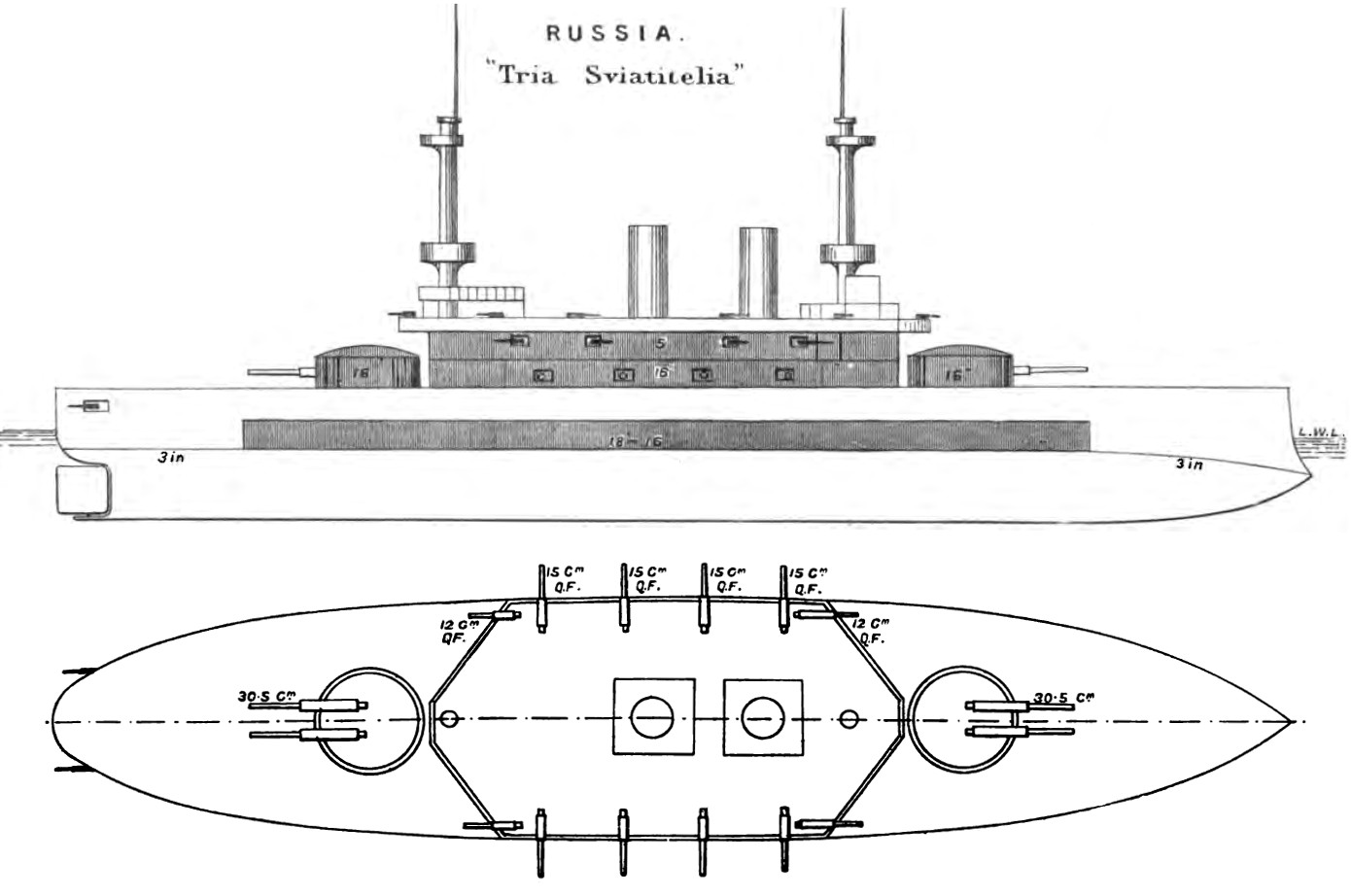
Right elevation and deck plan as depicted in Brassey's Naval Annual 1896

Tri Sviatitelia's design was based on an enlarged version of the Baltic Fleet battleship Navarin with some improvements in armour and armament. The ship was 371 feet (113.1 m) long at the waterline and 378 feet (115.2 m) long overall. She had a beam of 73 feet 3 inches (22.3 m) and a draught of 28 feet 6 inches (8.7 m). She displaced 13,415 long tons (13,630 t), over 800 long tons (813 t) more than her designed displacement of 12,480 long tons (12,680 t). Tri Sviatitelia was considerably larger than Navarin, being 23 feet 6 inches (7.2 m) longer, 6 feet (1.8 m) wider and displacing 3,000 long tons (3,048 t) more. She had a metacentric height of 5.58 feet (1.7 m).

=== Propulsion ===
The ships had a pair of three-cylinder vertical triple-expansion steam engines built by the British firm of Humphreys & Tennant that had a total designed output of 10,600 indicated horsepower (7,900 kW). Steam was provided to the engines by 14 cylindrical fire-tube boilers at a pressure of 128 psi (883 kPa; 9 kgf/cm^{2}), which drove pair of four-bladed screw propellers. On sea trials, the powerplant produced a total of 11,308 ihp (8,432 kW) and a top speed of 16.5 knots (30.6 km/h; 19.0 mph). She carried a maximum of 1,000 long tons (1,000 t) of coal at full load that provided a range of 2,250 nautical miles (4,170 km; 2,590 mi) at a speed of 10 knots (19 km/h; 12 mph). Tri Sviatitelia had three dynamos with a total output of 305 kW, but these were too small and could not supply enough power to work all the electrical equipment simultaneously.

=== Armament ===
Her main armament consisted of four 40-calibre 12-inch (305 mm) Obukhov Model 1895 guns mounted in hydraulically powered twin-gun turrets fore and aft. Each turret had a firing arc of 270°. The guns had a firing interval of 105 seconds between rounds. They had a maximum elevation of +15 degrees and could depress to −5 degrees. They fired a 731.3-pound (331.7 kg) shell at a muzzle velocity of 2,598 ft/s (792 m/s) to a range of 12,010 yards (10,980 m) at an elevation of 10°. 75 rounds per gun were carried.

All eight 45-caliber 6-inch (152 mm) Canet Pattern 1892 guns were mounted in casemates on the upper deck. The guns could elevate to a maximum of 20 degrees and depress to −5 degrees. They fired shells that weighed 91.27 lb (41.40 kg) with a muzzle velocity of 2,600 ft/s (790 m/s). They had a maximum range of 12,600 yards (11,500 m) when fired at maximum elevation.

The anti-torpedo boat armament consisted of a large number of different guns. Four 45-calibre 4.7-inch (119 mm) Canet Pattern 1892 guns were mounted at the corners of the superstructure. The gun fired 45.15-pound (20.48 kg) shells to a range of about 11,000 yards (10,000 m) at 18 degrees elevation with a muzzle velocity of 2,700 ft/s (820 m/s). The rate of fire was between twelve and fifteen rounds per minute. A total of 10 47-millimetre (1.9 in) Hotchkiss guns were carried: six between the 4.7-inch guns, two at the forward end of the superstructure and two in embrasures in the aft hull. They fired a 3.3-pound (1.5 kg) shell at a muzzle velocity of 1,476 ft/s (450 m/s) at a rate of 20 rounds per minute to a range of 2,020 yards (1,850 m). A total of 40 37-millimetre (1.5 in) Hotchkiss guns were mounted; eight in each of the fighting tops, eight on top of the superstructure, twelve in small hull embrasures fore and aft and the locations of the remaining four are uncertain. They fired a 1.1-pound (0.50 kg) shell at a muzzle velocity of 1,450 ft/s (440 m/s) at a rate of 20 rounds per minute to a range of 3,038 yards (2,778 m).

Tri Sviatitelia carried six 15-inch (381 mm) torpedo tubes. The forward broadside tubes were underwater, but the other four tubes were above water, one each in the bow and stern and the aft pair of broadside tubes. The Type L torpedo carried a 141-pound (64 kg) warhead of TNT. It had two speed settings which gave it a maximum range of 980 yards (900 m) at 25 knots (46 km/h; 29 mph) or 660 yards (600 m) at 29 knots (54 km/h; 33 mph).

=== Protection ===
Tri Sviatitelia was the first Russian ship to use Harvey armour. The armour was made by Vickers in Britain as well as the French firms of Schneider et Cie and Saint Chamond. The maximum thickness of the waterline belt was 18 inches (457 mm) which reduced to 16 inches (406 mm) abreast the magazines. This was the thickest armour ever carried by a Russian battleship. It covered 246 feet (75.0 m) of the ship's length. The belt was 8 feet (2.4 m) high, and tapered down to a thickness of 9 inches (229 mm) at the bottom edge. The upper 18 inches (457.2 mm) of the belt was intended to be above the waterline, but the ship was overweight and much of the belt was submerged. The belt terminated in 14–16-inch (356–406 mm) transverse bulkheads.

The lower casemate was above the belt, 218 feet (66.4 m) long and eight feet high, and was intended to protect the bases of the turrets. It had 16-inch sides and was closed off by 16-inch transverse bulkheads fore and aft. The upper casemate protected the six-inch guns and was 5 inches (127 mm) thick on all sides. The sides of the turrets were 16 inches (406 mm) thick and the conning tower's sides were 12 inches (305 mm) in thickness. The nickel steel armor deck was 2 inches (51 mm) thick over the lower casemate, but 3 inches (76 mm) thick forward and aft of the main armor belt to the bow and stern.

=== Major refit in 1911–12 ===
Tri Sviatitelia was reconstructed between November 1911 and August 1912. A number of different proposals had been considered earlier, including one to replace all of her obsolete Harvey armour with modern Krupp armour and others to replace her main guns or turrets, but these were rejected as too expensive. Her masts and fighting tops were replaced by pole masts and all of her light guns and torpedo tubes were removed with the exception of two 47-millimetre guns retained for use as saluting guns. Her 4.7-inch guns were replaced by four shielded 6-inch guns on the roof of the upper casemate. The upper casemate was modified to accommodate two extra 6-inch guns and her superstructure was reduced in size. The maximum elevation of her main guns was increased to 25° and their breeches and loading mechanisms were upgraded to increase their rate of fire to one round every 40 seconds. These modifications had the effect of reducing her displacement by almost 100 long tons (102 t) and she was capable of 16 knots (30 km/h; 18 mph) on her post-reconstruction sea trials.

== Service ==
Tri Sviatitelia was named after the Three Holy Hierarchs of the Eastern Orthodox Church. She was built by Nikolayev Dockyard and laid down 15 August 1891, although actual construction had begun about January 1891. The ship was launched 12 November 1893 and transferred to Sevastopol for completion the following year. Officially she entered service in 1895 with the Black Sea Fleet, but her sea trials did not begin until September–October 1896. In 1899 Tri Sviatitelia became the first ship in the world to be fitted with a radio, an installation designed by the Russian physicist Alexander Stepanovich Popov that had a range of about 3 miles (4.8 km). The ship was flagship of Rear Admiral F. F. Vishnevetskii during the failed attempt to recapture the mutinous battleship Potemkin on 30 June 1905. Her forward fighting top was removed about 1908.

=== World War I ===
Tri Sviatitelia, accompanied by the pre-dreadnoughts Evstafi (flagship), Ioann Zlatoust, Panteleimon (the former Potemkin), Rostislav, bombarded Trebizond on the morning of 17 November 1914 and was intercepted by the Ottoman battlecruiser Yavuz Sultan Selim and the light cruiser Midilli the following day on their return voyage to Sevastopol in what came to be known as the Battle of Cape Sarych. Despite the noon hour the conditions were foggy and the capital ships initially did not spot each other. The Black Sea Fleet had experimented on concentrating fire from several ships under the control of a "master ship" before the war and Evstafi held her fire until Ioann Zlatoust, the master ship, could see Yavuz. When the gunnery commands were finally received they showed a range 4,000 yards (3,700 m) in excess of Evstafi's own estimate of 8,000 yards (7,300 m), so Evstafi opened fire using her own data before the Yavuz turned to unmask its broadside. However the Tri Sviatitelia used Ioann Zlatoust's inaccurate range data and failed to register any hits on the Ottoman ship.

Tri Sviatitelia and Rostislav bombarded Ottoman fortifications at the mouth of the Bosphorus on 18 March 1915, but only fired 105 rounds before sailing north to rejoin the covering force. Tri Sviatitelia and Rostislav were to have repeated the bombardment the following day, but heavy fog prevented the operation. On 3 April, Yavuz and several ships of the Turkish navy raided the Russian port at Odessa; the Russian battleship squadron sortied to intercept them. The battleships chased Yavuz the entire day, but were unable to reach effective gunnery range and were forced to break off the chase. On 25 April Tri Sviatitelia and Rostislav repeated their bombardment of the Bosporus forts. Sviatitelia, Rostislav and Panteleimon bombarded the forts again on 2 and 3 May. However, this time a total of 337 main gun rounds were fired in addition to a total of 528 six-inch shells between the three battleships.

On 9 May 1915, Tri Sviatitelia and Panteleimon returned to bombard the Bosphorus forts, covered by the remaining pre-dreadnoughts. Yavuz intercepted the three ships of the covering force, although no damage was inflicted by either side. Tri Sviatitelia and Pantelimon rejoined their consorts and the latter scored two hits on Yavuz before she broke off the action. The Russian ships pursued her for six hours before giving up the chase. Tri Sviatitelia was fitted with a pair of 63.5-millimetre (2.50 in) anti-aircraft guns on top of each of her turrets during 1915 and screens were added on top of her funnels to keep out light bombs. On 12 August 1915 she, and all the other pre-dreadnoughts, were transferred to the 2nd Battleship Brigade, after the dreadnought Imperatritsa Mariya had entered service. During 1916 she conducted coast bombardment and anti-shipping missions off the Anatolian coast.

Tri Sviatitelia was refitting in Sevastopol during the February Revolution of 1917. Immobile, she was captured by the Germans in Sevastopol in May 1918 and handed over to the Allies in December 1918 after the Armistice. The British wrecked her engines on 24 April 1919 when they left the Crimea to prevent the advancing Bolsheviks from using her against the White Russians. The ship was captured by both sides during the Russian Civil War, but was abandoned by the White Russians when they evacuated the Crimea in November 1920. Tri Sviatitelia was scrapped in 1923, although she was not stricken from the Navy List until 21 November 1925.

== Bibliography ==
- Campbell, N. J. M. (1979). "Russia". In Chesneau, Roger & Kolesnik, Eugene M. (eds.). Conway's All the World's Fighting Ships 1860–1905. New York: Mayflower Books. pp. 170–217. ISBN 0-8317-0302-4.
- Halpern, Paul G. (1995). A Naval History of World War I. Annapolis, Maryland: Naval Institute Press. ISBN 1-55750-352-4.
- McLaughlin, Stephen (2003). Russian & Soviet Battleships. Annapolis, Maryland: Naval Institute Press. ISBN 1-55750-481-4.
- Nekrasov, George (1992). North of Gallipoli: The Black Sea Fleet at War 1914–1917. East European Monographs. Vol. CCCXLIII. Boulder, Colorado: East European Monographs. ISBN 0-88033-240-9.
