= Three Holy Hierarchs =

Influential bishops of the early church (4th century)

The Three Hierarchs
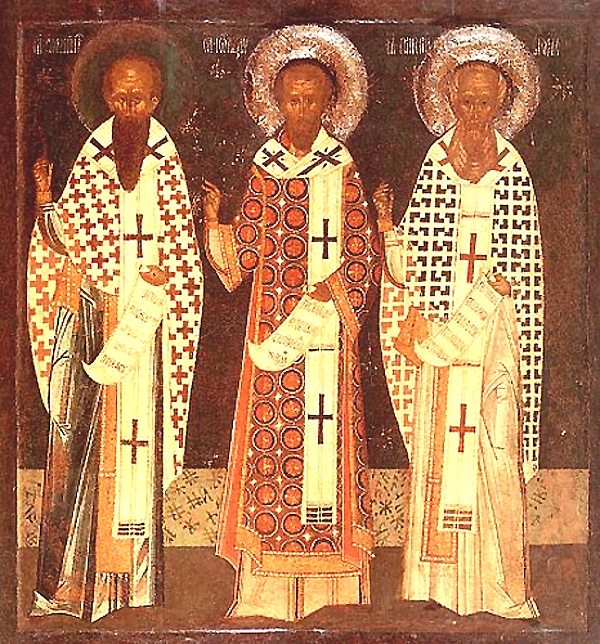
- Icon for the feast day of the Synaxis of the Three Hierarchs

Fathers Among the Saints Doctors of the Church
- Born: 330 (Basil); 349 (John); 329 (Gregory)
- Died: 379 (Basil); 407 (John); 389 (Gregory)
- Venerated in: Eastern Orthodox Church; Catholic Church; Oriental Orthodox Church; Church of England
- Feast: January 30
- Attributes: Vested as bishops, wearing omophoria; raising right hand in blessing; holding Gospel Books or scrolls
- Patronage: Education

The Three Hierarchs (Ancient Greek: Οἱ Τρεῖς Ἱεράρχαι; Greek: Οι Τρεις Ιεράρχες) of Eastern Christianity refers to Basil the Great (also known as Basil of Caesarea), Gregory the Theologian (also known as Gregory of Nazianzus) and John Chrysostom. They were highly influential bishops of the early church who played pivotal roles in shaping Christian theology. In Eastern Christianity they are also known as the Three Great Hierarchs and Ecumenical Teachers, while in Roman Catholicism the three are honored as Doctors of the Church. The three are venerated as saints in Eastern Orthodoxy, Catholicism, Anglicanism, and other Christian churches.

== Who is Greatest? ==
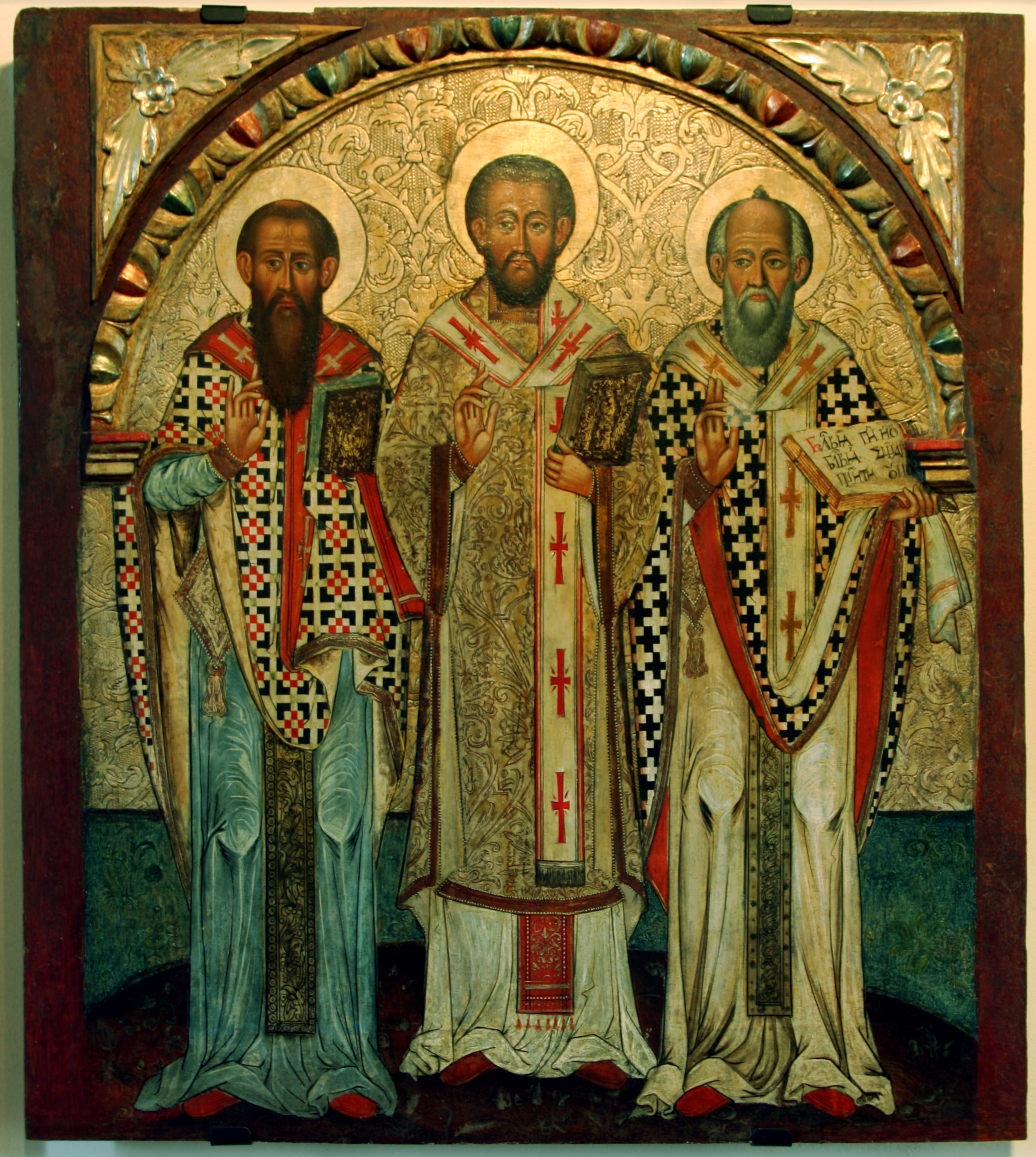
Icon of the Three Hierarchs: Basil the Great (left), John Chrysostom (center) and Gregory the Theologian (right)—from Lipie, Historic Museum in Sanok, Poland.

Disputes raged in 11th century Constantinople about which of the three hierarchs was the greatest. Some argued that Basil was superior to the other two because of his explanations of Christian faith and monastic example. Supporters of John Chrysostom countered that the "Golden Mouthed" (Greek: Χρυσόστομος) archbishop of Constantinople was unmatched in both eloquence and in bringing sinners to repentance. A third group insisted that Basil's close friend, Gregory the Theologian, was preferred to the others due to the majesty, purity, and profundity of his homilies and his defense of the faith from the Arian heresy.

== Feast Days ==
All three have separate feast days in January: Basil on January 1, Gregory on January 25, and Chrysostom on January 27. The Eastern Churches teach that the three hierarchs appeared together in a vision to St. John Mauropous, bishop of Euchaita, in the year 1084, and said that they were equal before God: "There are no divisions among us, and no opposition to one another." As a result, a January 30 feast day commemorating all three in common was instituted around 1100 under the Byzantine Emperor Alexios I Komnenos.

== See also ==
- Cappadocian Fathers
- Patristics
- Russian battleship Tri Sviatitelia, named after the Three Holy Hierarchs
- Kyiv Theological Seminary of the Three Holy Hierarchs, a major seminary of the Ukrainian Greek Catholic Church.
