= 120 mm 45 caliber Pattern 1892 =

120mm 45 caliber Pattern 1892
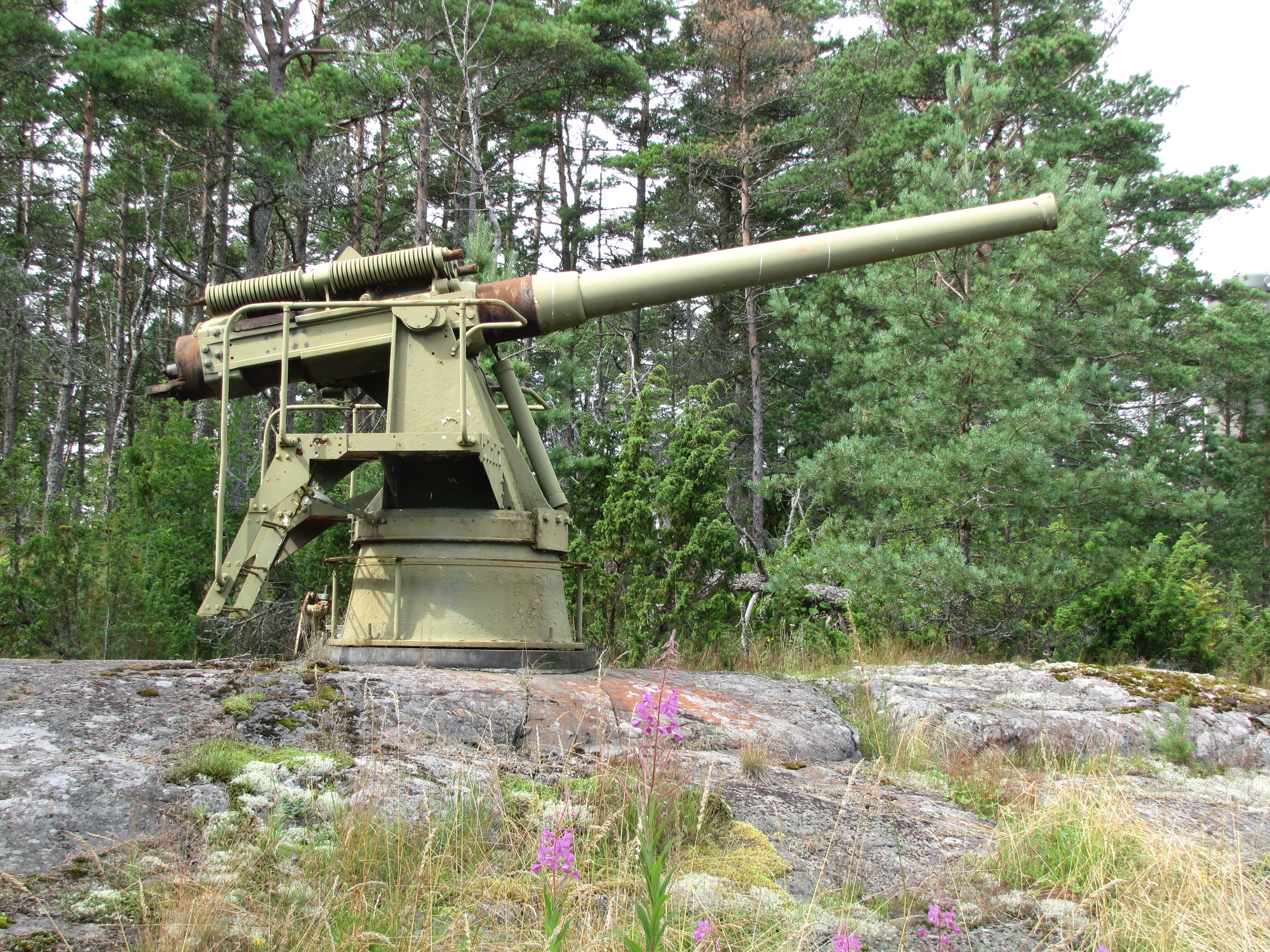
- 120mm 45 caliber Pattern 1892 gun on Kuivasaari Island.
- Type: Naval gun Coastal artillery Railway artillery
- Place of origin: France

Service history
- In service: 1897-1945
- Used by: Russian Empire; Soviet Union; Finland; Japan
- Wars: Boxer Rebellion; Russo-Japanese War; World War I Russian Civil War; Winter War; World War II

Production history
- Designer: Canet
- Designed: 1891
- Manufacturer: Obukhov; Perm
- Produced: 1897

Specifications
- Mass: 2.95 t (3.25 short tons)
- Length: 5.4 m (17 ft 9 in)
- Barrel length: 4.2 m (13 ft 9 in)
- Shell: Fixed QF ammunition
- Shell weight: 20.4 kg (45 lb)
- Caliber: 120 mm (4.7 in) 45 caliber
- Elevation: -7° to +20°
- Rate of fire: 12-15 rpm
- Muzzle velocity: 823 m/s (2,700 ft/s)
- Maximum firing range: 11.8 km (7.3 mi) at +20°

The 120mm 45 caliber Pattern 1892 was a Russian naval gun developed in the years before the Russo-Japanese War that armed a variety of warships of the Imperial Russian Navy during the Russo-Japanese War and World War I. Guns salvaged from scrapped ships found a second life on river gunboats of the Soviet Navy during the Russian Civil War and as coastal artillery and railway artillery during World War II. It was estimated that in 1941 there were 35 still in service.

== History ==
In 1891 a Russian naval delegation was shown three guns designed by the French designer Canet. One was a 75/50 gun, one was a 120/45 gun, and the last was a 152/45 gun. All three guns used fixed QF ammunition which produced a rate of fire of 15 rpm for the 75/50 gun, 12 rpm for the 120/45 gun and 10 rpm for the 152/45 gun. The Russians were impressed and in 1892 they negotiated a production license for all three guns.

== Construction ==
There were two main series of the 120/45 guns produced. The first series of 76 guns were built between 1897 and 1905 at the Obhukov factory. During the Russo-Japanese war a number of barrels of the 152/45 guns burst in action and a strengthened series of 152/45 and 120/45 guns were ordered. 34 of the second series of strengthened guns were built between 1905 and 1915 at the Obhukov factory. Between 1914 and 1916 production switched to the Perm factory and a further 18 strengthened guns were produced there.

== Naval use ==
120/45 guns armed a variety of ships such as armored cruisers, auxiliary cruisers, coastal defense ships, destroyers, gunboats, minesweepers, pre-dreadnought battleships, protected cruisers, seaplane tenders and unprotected cruisers of the Imperial Russian Navy built between 1890 and 1916.

=== Armored cruisers ===
- Dmitriy Donskoi-class - The secondary armament of Dmitrii Donskoi consisted of ten, 120/45 guns, in single mounts after an 1895 refit. The secondary armament of Vladimir Monomakh consisted of six, 120/45 guns, in single mounts after an 1897 refit.
- Rurik - The tertiary armament of this ship consisted of six, 120/45 guns, in single mounts.

=== Auxiliary cruisers ===
- Angara - The primary armament of this ship consisted of six, shielded, 120/45 guns.
- Dnepr - The primary armament of this ship consisted of seven, shielded, 120/45 guns.
- Don - The primary armament of this ship consisted of two, shielded, 120/45 guns.
- Lena - The primary armament of this ship consisted of six, shielded, 120/45 guns.
- Kuban - The primary armament of this ship consisted of two, shielded, 120/45 guns.
- Oryol - The primary armament of this ship consisted of two, shielded, 120/45 guns.
- Rion - The primary armament of this ship consisted of eight, shielded, 120/45 guns.
- Terek - The primary armament of this ship consisted of two, shielded, 120/45 guns.
- Ural - The primary armament of this ship consisted of two, shielded, 120/45 guns.

=== Coastal defense ships ===
- Admiral Ushakov-class - The secondary armament of this class of three ships consisted of four, 120/45 guns, in casemates amidships.

=== Destroyers ===
- Lieutenant Shestakov-class - The primary armament of this class of four ships consisted of one, forward, shielded, 120/45 gun.

=== Gunboats ===
- Gilyak - The primary armament of this ship consisted of one, forward, shielded, 120/45 gun.
- Gilyak-class - The primary armament of this class of four ships consisted of two, shielded, 120/45 guns, in single mounts, fore and aft.
- Korietz-class - Four ships of this class the Donets, Kubanets, Terets and Uralets had a tertiary armament of one, 120/45 gun, after 1905-1921 refits.
- Vogul-class - The primary armament of this ship consisted of two, shielded, 120/45 guns, in single mounts, fore and aft.

=== Minesweepers ===
- Sofiya - This ships primary armament consisted of one, 120/45 gun, in a forward single mount.
- Amur-class - This class of two ships primary armament consisted of five 120/45 guns, in single mounts.

=== Pre-dreadnought battleships ===
- Andrei Pervozvanny-class - This class of two ships tertiary armament consisted of twelve, casemated, 120/45 guns, in single mounts. Four guns were in the bow, four in the stern and four amidships.
- Sissoi Veliky - This ships tertiary armament consisted of four, 120/45 guns, in single mounts after a 1904 refit.
- Tri Sviatitelia - This ships tertiary armament consisted of four, 120/45 guns, in single mounts.
- Navarin - This ships tertiary armament consisted of four, 120/45 guns, in single mounts after a 1904 refit.

=== Protected cruisers ===
- Boyarin - The primary armament of this ship consisted of six, shielded, 120/45 guns, in single mounts. One each at the bow and stern and four in sponsons amidships.
- Izumrud-class - This class of two ships primary armament consisted of six, 120/45 guns, in single mounts.
- Novik - The primary armament of this ship consisted of six, 120/45 guns, in single mounts.

=== Seaplane tenders ===
- Imperator Aleksandr I - The primary armament of this ship consisted of six, 120/45 guns, in single mounts.
- Imperator Nikolay I - The primary armament of this ship consisted of six, 120/45 guns, in single mounts.

=== Unprotected cruisers ===
- Almaz - The primary armament of this ship consisted of seven, 120/45 guns, in single mounts after a 1915 refit.

== Ammunition ==
Ammunition was of fixed QF type. A complete round weighed 20.4 kg (45 lb).

The gun was able to fire:

- Armor Piercing
- Chemical
- Common
- High Explosive
- Illumination
- Incendiary
- SAP
- Shrapnel

== Photo gallery ==
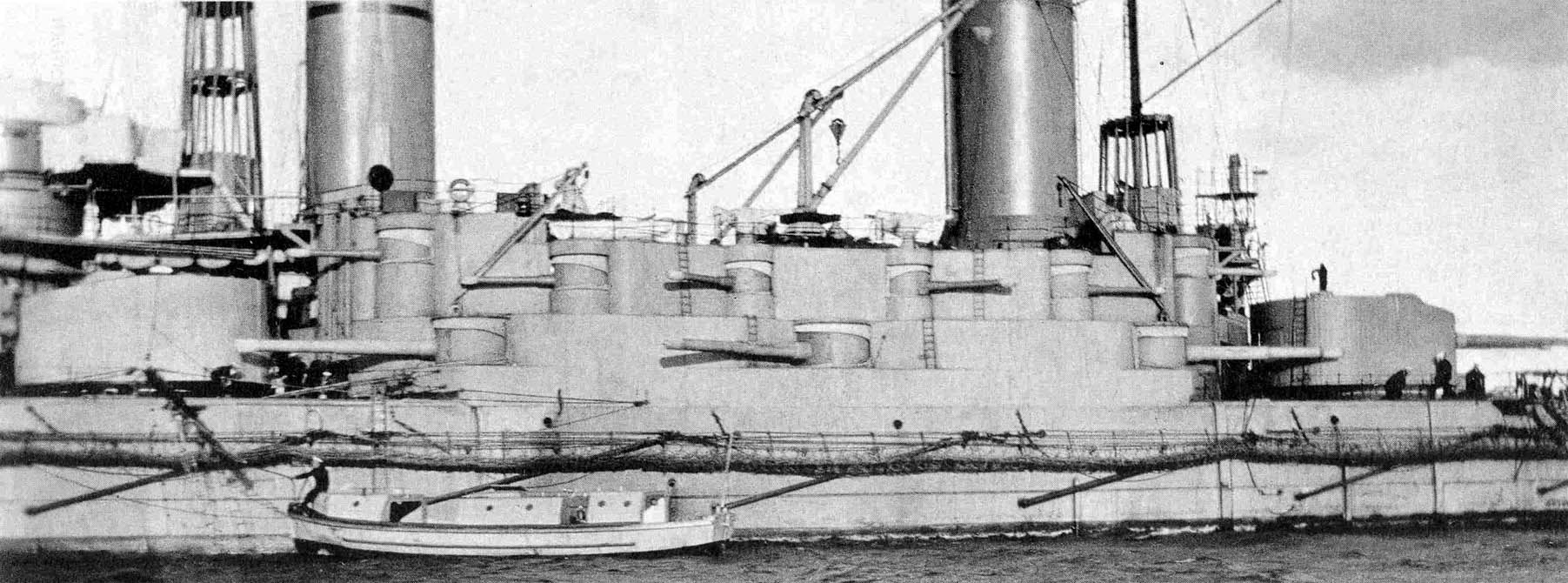
Casemated 120mm guns aboard the battleship Andrei Pervozvanny, August 1914.

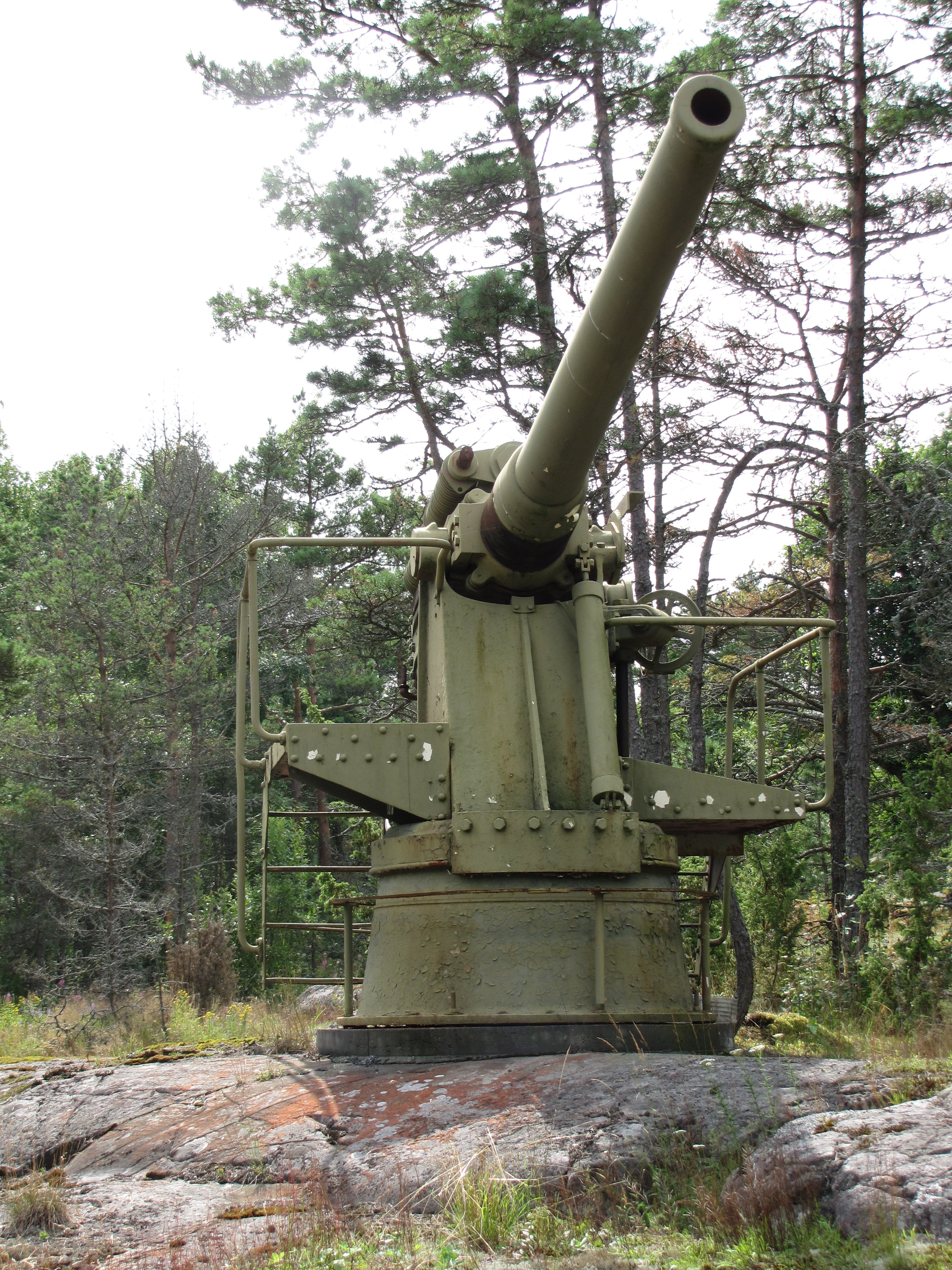
120mm 45 caliber Canet coastal gun on Kuivasaari Island. This gun was in Finnish coastal artillery school until 1993.

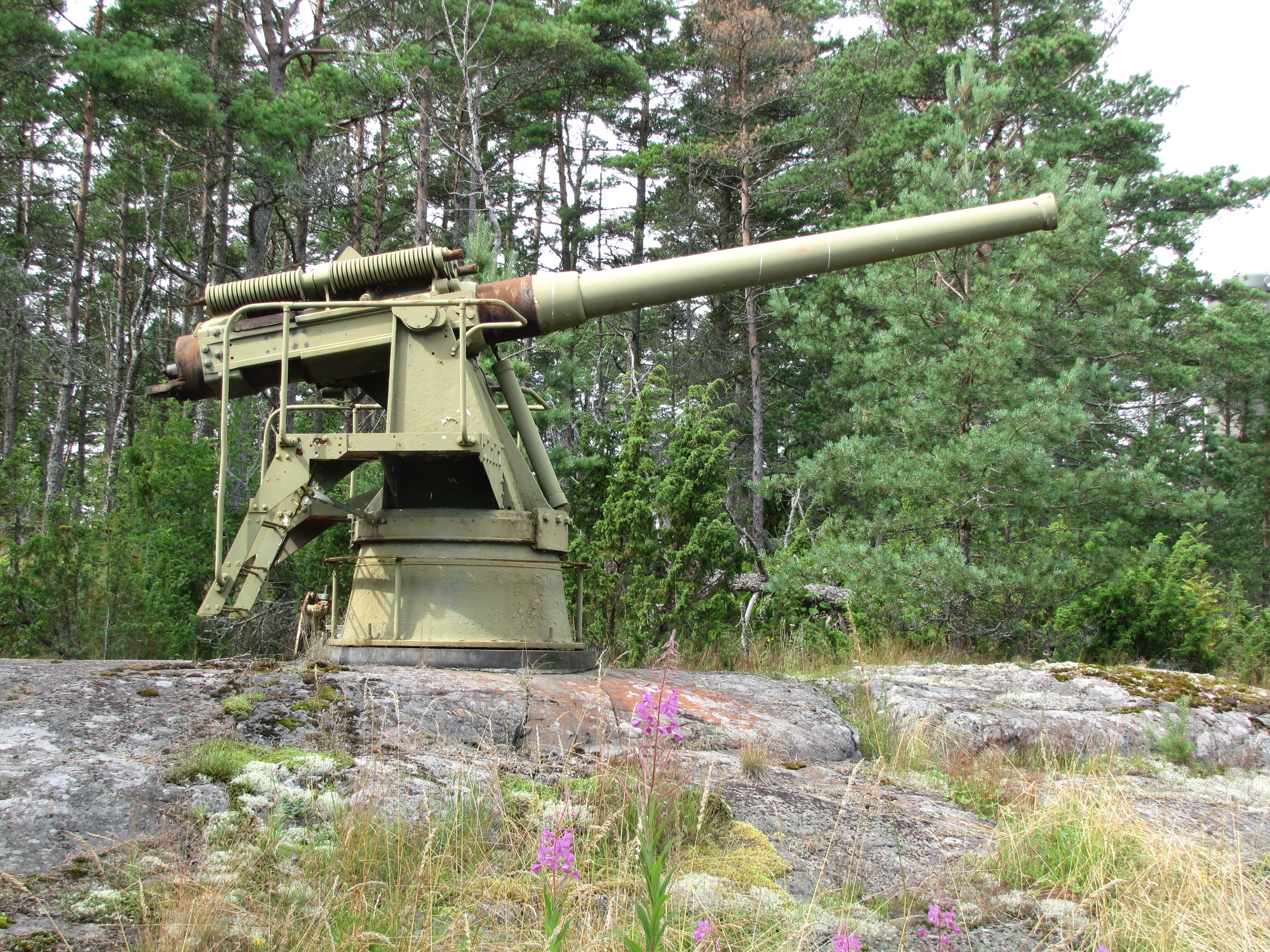
This gun has been modified from the original 1892 model, including rotating the gun 180 degrees so that the recoil system is on top of the barrel to increase elevation.
