= List of former ships of the Indonesian Navy =

Naval Jack of Indonesia

The following article lists the many former ships of the Indonesian Navy that are no longer in service. Older ships may use the old prefix "RI" instead of the current "KRI" prefix. Note: some of the classes use the 'Indonesian Designation' from SIPRI.

== Submarine Fleet ==
Image	Class	Origin	Quantity	Ships	Notes
Attack Submarine
	Cakra class	Germany	1	KRI Nanggala (402)	Sank on 21 April 2021 during torpedo exercise. Sinking presumably caused by power outage.
	Type 206	Germany	5	KRI Nagarangsang (403); KRI Nagabanda (404); KRI Bramastra (405); KRI Cundamani (406); KRI Alugoro (407)	Former West German Type 206 submarines. Cancelled. Two submarines were acquired in September 1997, to be followed by three more. Already named and assigned pennant numbers. Cancelled in June 1998 due to funding issues.
RI Tjakra, Jalesveva Jayamahe, p180	Tjakra class	Soviet Union	14	KRI Tjakra (401); KRI Nanggala (402); KRI Nagabanda (403); KRI Trisula (404); KRI Nagarangsang (405); KRI Tjandrasa (406); KRI Alugoro (407); KRI Tjundamani (408); KRI Widjajadanu (409); KRI Pasopati (410); KRI Hendradjala (411); KRI Bramastra (412) no name no name	Former Soviet medium submarines of Project 613. Retired. Last 2 ships are used as source of spare parts. KRI Pasopati is preserved as a museum/monument ship in Surabaya.

== Surface Fleet ==
Image	Class	Origin	Quantity	Ships	Notes
Cruiser
	Irian class	Soviet Union	1	KRI Irian (201)	Ex-Ordzhonikidze. Bought from the Soviet Union in 1962. Retired and sold for scrap to Taiwan in 1972.
Destroyer
	Imam Bondjol class	Italy	2	KRI Imam Bondjol (355)	Retired 1978.
	Imam Bondjol class	Italy	2	KRI Soerapati (356)	Retired 1978.
Indonesian ship RI Siliwangi, Jalesveva Jayamahe, p44	Skory class	Soviet Union	8	KRI Siliwangi (201)	Retired. Sold for scrap 1973.
Indonesian ship RI Siliwangi, Jalesveva Jayamahe, p44	Skory class	Soviet Union	8	KRI Sisingamaradja (202)	Retired. Sold for scrap 1971.
Indonesian ship RI Siliwangi, Jalesveva Jayamahe, p44	Skory class	Soviet Union	8	KRI Sandjaja (203)	Retired 1971.
Indonesian ship RI Siliwangi, Jalesveva Jayamahe, p44	Skory class	Soviet Union	8	KRI Sawoenggaling (ex-Sarwadjala-204)	Retired 1971. Sold for scrap.
Indonesian ship RI Siliwangi, Jalesveva Jayamahe, p44	Skory class	Soviet Union	8	KRI Sultan Iskandar Muda (304)	Retired 1973.
Indonesian ship RI Siliwangi, Jalesveva Jayamahe, p44	Skory class	Soviet Union	8	KRI Sultan Darmuda (305)	Retired 1973.
Indonesian ship RI Siliwangi, Jalesveva Jayamahe, p44	Skory class	Soviet Union	8	KRI Diponegoro (306)	Retired 1973.
Indonesian ship RI Siliwangi, Jalesveva Jayamahe, p44	Skory class	Soviet Union	8	KRI Brawidjaja (307)	Retired 1973.
RI Gadjah Mada, Jalesveva Jayamahe, p32	Gadjah Mada class	United Kingdom	1	KRI Gadjah Mada	Ex-HNLMS Tjerk Hiddes. Scrapped 1961.
Frigate
	Ahmad Yani class	Netherlands	1	KRI Slamet Riyadi (352)	Ex-HNLMS Van Speijk. Retired in 2019. Sunk as a target ship 2023.
	Martha Khristina Tiyahahu class (Note: Also called "Tiyahahu class" by SIPRI Armstrade)	United Kingdom	3	KRI Martha Christina Tiahahu (331)	Ex-HMS Zulu (F124). Stricken 2000, scrapped.
	Martha Khristina Tiyahahu class	United Kingdom	3	KRI Wilhelmus Zakaria Johannes (332)	Ex-HMS Gurkha (F122). Stricken 2000, scrapped.
	Martha Khristina Tiyahahu class	United Kingdom	3	KRI Hasanuddin (333)	Ex-HMS Tartar (F133). Stricken 2000, scrapped.
	Samadikun class	United States	4	KRI Samadikun (341)	Ex-USS John R. Perry (DE-1034). Decommissioned 2003.
	Samadikun class	United States	4	KRI Martadinata (342)	Ex-USS Charles Berry (DE-1035). Decommissioned 2005.
	Samadikun class	United States	4	KRI Monginsidi (343)	Ex-USS Claud Jones (DE-1033). Decommissioned 2003.
	Samadikun class	United States	4	KRI Ngurah Rai (344)	Ex-USS McMorris (DE-1036). Decommissioned 2003.
	Riga class	Soviet Union	8	KRI Jos Soedarso (351)	Retired.
	Riga class	Soviet Union	8	KRI Slamet Rijadi (352)	Retired.
	Riga class	Soviet Union	8	KRI Ngurah Rai (353)	Retired.
	Riga class	Soviet Union	8	KRI Walter Mongisidi (354)	Retired.
	Riga class	Soviet Union	8	KRI Lambung Mangkurat (357)	Retired.
	Riga class	Soviet Union	8	KRI Hang Tuah (358)	Retired.
	Riga class	Soviet Union	8	KRI Kakiali (359)	Retired.
	Riga class	Soviet Union	8	KRI Nuku (360)	Retired.
Corvette
KRI Ki Hajar Dewantara	Dewantara class	Yugoslavia	1	KRI Ki Hajar Dewantara (364)	Mostly used as training ship. Retired in 2019.
	Kapitan Pattimura class Ex-Parchim I-class (Project 133.1) Corvette	East Germany	2	KRI Memet Sastrawiria (380)	(380) Decommissioned in 2008. Scuttled 2008.
	Kapitan Pattimura class Ex-Parchim I-class (Project 133.1) Corvette	East Germany	2	KRI Pati Unus (384)	(384) Decommissioned in 2017.
	Banteng class	Australia	4	KRI Hang Toeah (253)	Ex-HMAS Ipswich (J186). Sunk 1958.
	Banteng class	Australia	4	KRI Radjawali (254)	Ex-HMAS Wollongong (J172). Scrapped 1968.
	Banteng class	Australia	4	KRI Banteng (255)	Ex-HMAS Cairns (J183). Scrapped in 1968.
	Banteng class	Australia	4	KRI Pati Oenes (256)	Ex-HMAS Tamworth (J181). Disposed 1969.
	Pattimura class	Italy	2	KRI Pattimura (801)	Retired
	Pattimura class	Italy	2	KRI Hasanuddin (802)	Retired
Minesweeper
	Pulau Rote class	East Germany	3	KRI Pulau Rote (721)	(721) Decommissioned on 28 August 2019.
	Pulau Rote class	East Germany	3	KRI Pulau Rempang (729)	(729) Decommissioned on 15 October 2021.
	Pulau Rote class	East Germany	3	KRI Pulau Romang (723)	(723) Decommissioned on 6 February 2024.
Pulau Rau class minesweeper, Jalesveva Jayamahe, p37	Pulau Rau class	Germany	10	KRI Pulau Rau (501)	Modified design of German WWII-era 'R' type inshore minesweeper. Had a light metal framework covered with wood. Retired.
Pulau Rau class minesweeper, Jalesveva Jayamahe, p37	Pulau Rau class	Germany	10	KRI Pulau Roma (502)	Modified design of German WWII-era 'R' type inshore minesweeper. Had a light metal framework covered with wood. Retired.
Pulau Rau class minesweeper, Jalesveva Jayamahe, p37	Pulau Rau class	Germany	10	KRI Pulau Rass (503)	Modified design of German WWII-era 'R' type inshore minesweeper. Had a light metal framework covered with wood. Retired.
Pulau Rau class minesweeper, Jalesveva Jayamahe, p37	Pulau Rau class	Germany	10	KRI Pulau Roti (504)	Modified design of German WWII-era 'R' type inshore minesweeper. Had a light metal framework covered with wood. Retired.
Pulau Rau class minesweeper, Jalesveva Jayamahe, p37	Pulau Rau class	Germany	10	KRI Pulau Rupat (505)	Modified design of German WWII-era 'R' type inshore minesweeper. Had a light metal framework covered with wood. Retired.
Pulau Rau class minesweeper, Jalesveva Jayamahe, p37	Pulau Rau class	Germany	10	KRI Pulau Rangsang (506)	Modified design of German WWII-era 'R' type inshore minesweeper. Had a light metal framework covered with wood. Retired.
Pulau Rau class minesweeper, Jalesveva Jayamahe, p37	Pulau Rau class	Germany	10	KRI Pulau Rindja (507)	Modified design of German WWII-era 'R' type inshore minesweeper. Had a light metal framework covered with wood. Retired.
Pulau Rau class minesweeper, Jalesveva Jayamahe, p37	Pulau Rau class	Germany	10	KRI Pulau Rempang (508)	Modified design of German WWII-era 'R' type inshore minesweeper. Had a light metal framework covered with wood. Retired.
Pulau Rau class minesweeper, Jalesveva Jayamahe, p37	Pulau Rau class	Germany	10	KRI Pulau Rengat (509)	Modified design of German WWII-era 'R' type inshore minesweeper. Had a light metal framework covered with wood. Retired.
Pulau Rau class minesweeper, Jalesveva Jayamahe, p37	Pulau Rau class	Germany	10	KRI Pulau Rusa (510)	Modified design of German WWII-era 'R' type inshore minesweeper. Had a light metal framework covered with wood. Retired.
	T43 class	Soviet Union	6	KRI Pulau Rani (701)	Former Soviet ocean minesweepers of Projects 254K and 254M. Retired.
	T43 class	Soviet Union	6	KRI Pulau Ratevo (702)	Former Soviet ocean minesweepers of Projects 254K and 254M. Retired.
	T43 class	Soviet Union	6	KRI Pulau Roon (703)	Former Soviet ocean minesweepers of Projects 254K and 254M. Retired.
	T43 class	Soviet Union	6	KRI Pulau Rorbas (704)	Former Soviet ocean minesweepers of Projects 254K and 254M. Retired.
	T43 class	Soviet Union	6	KRI Pulau Radja (705)	Former Soviet ocean minesweepers of Projects 254K and 254M. Retired.
	T43 class	Soviet Union	6	KRI Pulau Rondo (706)	Former Soviet ocean minesweepers of Projects 254K and 254M. Retired.
	Bluebird class	United States	6	KRI Pulau Alor (717)	Former USN Bluebird class. Wooden hulls with low magnetic signature. Retired.
	Bluebird class	United States	6	KRI Pulau Aruan (718)	Former USN Bluebird class. Wooden hulls with low magnetic signature. Retired.
	Bluebird class	United States	6	KRI Pulau Anjer (719)	Former USN Bluebird class. Wooden hulls with low magnetic signature. Retired.
	Bluebird class	United States	6	KRI Pulau Impalasa (720)	Former USN Bluebird class. Wooden hulls with low magnetic signature. Retired.
	Bluebird class	United States	6	KRI Pulau Antang (721)	Former USN Bluebird class. Wooden hulls with low magnetic signature. Retired.
	Bluebird class	United States	6	KRI Pulau Aru (722)	Former USN Bluebird class. Wooden hulls with low magnetic signature. Retired.
	DEFG class	Netherlands	4	KRI Djombang (Note: Using current prefix of the Indonesian Navy)	Transferred to Indonesia in 1950, Retired.
	DEFG class	Netherlands	4	KRI Djampea (Note: Using current prefix of the Indonesian Navy)	Transferred to Indonesia in 1950, Retired.
	DEFG class	Netherlands	4	KRI Enggano (Note: Using current prefix of the Indonesian Navy)	Transferred to Indonesia in 1950, Retired.
	DEFG class	Netherlands	4	KRI Flores (Note: Using current prefix of the Indonesian Navy)	Transferred to Indonesia in 1950, Retired.
Submarine Chaser
Unidentified PC anti-submarine boat, Jalesveva Jayamahe, p101	PC-461 class	United States	5	KRI Hiu (805)	Former US PC 173 ft submarine chasers. Retired. Also classified as corvettes.
Unidentified PC anti-submarine boat, Jalesveva Jayamahe, p101	PC-461 class	United States	5	KRI Tenggiri (806)	Former US PC 173 ft submarine chasers. Retired. Also classified as corvettes.
Unidentified PC anti-submarine boat, Jalesveva Jayamahe, p101	PC-461 class	United States	5	KRI Tjakalang (807)	Former US PC 173 ft submarine chasers. Retired. Also classified as corvettes.
Unidentified PC anti-submarine boat, Jalesveva Jayamahe, p101	PC-461 class	United States	5	KRI Torani (808)	Former US PC 173 ft submarine chasers. Retired. Also classified as corvettes.
Unidentified PC anti-submarine boat, Jalesveva Jayamahe, p101	PC-461 class	United States	5	KRI Alu-alu (809)	Former US PC 173 ft submarine chasers. Retired. Also classified as corvettes.
Unidentified Indonesian ships, Jalesveva Jayamahe, p39	Kronshtadt class	Soviet Union	14	KRI Barakuda	Retired. Also classified as corvettes.
Unidentified Indonesian ships, Jalesveva Jayamahe, p39	Kronshtadt class	Soviet Union	14	KRI Kakap	Retired. Also classified as corvettes.
Unidentified Indonesian ships, Jalesveva Jayamahe, p39	Kronshtadt class	Soviet Union	14	KRI Katula	Retired. Also classified as corvettes.
Unidentified Indonesian ships, Jalesveva Jayamahe, p39	Kronshtadt class	Soviet Union	14	KRI Landjuru	Retired. Also classified as corvettes.
Unidentified Indonesian ships, Jalesveva Jayamahe, p39	Kronshtadt class	Soviet Union	14	KRI Lapai	Retired. Also classified as corvettes.
Unidentified Indonesian ships, Jalesveva Jayamahe, p39	Kronshtadt class	Soviet Union	14	KRI Lumba-lumba	Retired. Also classified as corvettes.
Unidentified Indonesian ships, Jalesveva Jayamahe, p39	Kronshtadt class	Soviet Union	14	KRI Mandidhang	Retired. Also classified as corvettes.
Unidentified Indonesian ships, Jalesveva Jayamahe, p39	Kronshtadt class	Soviet Union	14	KRI Momae	Retired. Also classified as corvettes.
Unidentified Indonesian ships, Jalesveva Jayamahe, p39	Kronshtadt class	Soviet Union	14	KRI Palu	Retired. Also classified as corvettes.
Unidentified Indonesian ships, Jalesveva Jayamahe, p39	Kronshtadt class	Soviet Union	14	KRI Pandrong	Retired. Also classified as corvettes.
Unidentified Indonesian ships, Jalesveva Jayamahe, p39	Kronshtadt class	Soviet Union	14	KRI Sura	Retired. Also classified as corvettes.
Unidentified Indonesian ships, Jalesveva Jayamahe, p39	Kronshtadt class	Soviet Union	14	KRI Tohok	Retired. Also classified as corvettes.
Unidentified Indonesian ships, Jalesveva Jayamahe, p39	Kronshtadt class	Soviet Union	14	KRI Tongkol	Retired. Also classified as corvettes.
Unidentified Indonesian ships, Jalesveva Jayamahe, p39	Kronshtadt class	Soviet Union	14	KRI Tjutjut	Retired. Also classified as corvettes.
	Kelabang class	Indonesia	3	KRI Kalahitam	Stricken in 1981.
	Kelabang class	Indonesia	3	KRI Kelabang	Stricken in 1981.
	Kelabang class	Indonesia	3	KRI Kompas	Stricken in 1981.
Fast Attack Craft
	Klewang class	Indonesia	1	KRI Klewang (625)	Futuristic design, stealth wave-piercing trimaran carbon composite hull. In 2012, Klewang was destroyed by fire being outfitted at shipyard.
	Mandau class	South Korea	1	KRI Rencong (622)	Sank on 11 September 2018.
Honor guard as ship passes, Jalesveva Jayamahe, p96	Jaguar class	Germany	8	KRI Serigala	Retired.
Honor guard as ship passes, Jalesveva Jayamahe, p96	Jaguar class	Germany	8	KRI Beruang	Retired.
Honor guard as ship passes, Jalesveva Jayamahe, p96	Jaguar class	Germany	8	KRI Matjan Tutul	Retired.
Honor guard as ship passes, Jalesveva Jayamahe, p96	Jaguar class	Germany	8	KRI Matjan Kumbang	Retired.
Honor guard as ship passes, Jalesveva Jayamahe, p96	Jaguar class	Germany	8	KRI Anoa	Retired.
Honor guard as ship passes, Jalesveva Jayamahe, p96	Jaguar class	Germany	8	KRI Adjak	Retired.
Honor guard as ship passes, Jalesveva Jayamahe, p96	Jaguar class	Germany	8	KRI Singa	Retired.
Honor guard as ship passes, Jalesveva Jayamahe, p96	Jaguar class	Germany	8	KRI Harimau	Retired.
	Komar class	Soviet Union	12	KRI Kelaplintah (601)	Retired.
	Komar class	Soviet Union	12	KRI Kalmisani (602)	Retired.
	Komar class	Soviet Union	12	KRI Sarpawasesa (603)	Retired.
	Komar class	Soviet Union	12	KRI Sarpamina (604)	Retired.
	Komar class	Soviet Union	12	KRI Pulanggeni (605)	Retired.
	Komar class	Soviet Union	12	KRI Kalanada (606)	Retired.
	Komar class	Soviet Union	12	KRI Hardadedali (607)	Retired.
	Komar class	Soviet Union	12	KRI Sarotama (608)	Retired.
	Komar class	Soviet Union	12	KRI Ratjabala (609)	Retired.
	Komar class	Soviet Union	12	KRI Tritusta (610)	Retired.
	Komar class	Soviet Union	12	KRI Nagapasa (611)	Retired.
	Komar class	Soviet Union	12	KRI Gwawidjaja (612)	Retired.
Indonesian torpedo motorboat, Jalesveva Jayamahe, p102	P-6 class	Soviet Union	14	KRI Angin Bohorok (1601)	Retired. Soviet project-186 class torpedo boats.
Indonesian torpedo motorboat, Jalesveva Jayamahe, p102	P-6 class	Soviet Union	14	KRI Angin Badai (1602)	Retired. Soviet project-186 class torpedo boats.
Indonesian torpedo motorboat, Jalesveva Jayamahe, p102	P-6 class	Soviet Union	14	KRI Angin Taufan (1603)	Retired. Soviet project-186 class torpedo boats.
Indonesian torpedo motorboat, Jalesveva Jayamahe, p102	P-6 class	Soviet Union	14	KRI Angin Gending (1604)	Retired. Soviet project-186 class torpedo boats.
Indonesian torpedo motorboat, Jalesveva Jayamahe, p102	P-6 class	Soviet Union	14	KRI Angin Prahara (1605)	Retired. Soviet project-186 class torpedo boats.
Indonesian torpedo motorboat, Jalesveva Jayamahe, p102	P-6 class	Soviet Union	14	KRI Angin Pujuh (1606)	Retired. Soviet project-186 class torpedo boats.
Indonesian torpedo motorboat, Jalesveva Jayamahe, p102	P-6 class	Soviet Union	14	KRI Angin Pasat (1607)	Retired. Soviet project-186 class torpedo boats.
Indonesian torpedo motorboat, Jalesveva Jayamahe, p102	P-6 class	Soviet Union	14	KRI Angin Wambrau (1608)	Retired. Soviet project-186 class torpedo boats.
Indonesian torpedo motorboat, Jalesveva Jayamahe, p102	P-6 class	Soviet Union	14	KRI Angin Brubu (1609)	Retired. Soviet project-186 class torpedo boats.
Indonesian torpedo motorboat, Jalesveva Jayamahe, p102	P-6 class	Soviet Union	14	KRI Angin Tonggi (1610)	Retired. Soviet project-186 class torpedo boats.
Indonesian torpedo motorboat, Jalesveva Jayamahe, p102	P-6 class	Soviet Union	14	KRI Angin Grenggong (1611)	Retired. Soviet project-186 class torpedo boats.
Indonesian torpedo motorboat, Jalesveva Jayamahe, p102	P-6 class	Soviet Union	14	KRI Angin Wamandais (1612)	Retired. Soviet project-186 class torpedo boats.
Indonesian torpedo motorboat, Jalesveva Jayamahe, p102	P-6 class	Soviet Union	14	KRI Angin Kumbang (1613)	Retired. Soviet project-186 class torpedo boats.
Indonesian torpedo motorboat, Jalesveva Jayamahe, p102	P-6 class	Soviet Union	14	KRI Angin RIbut (1614)	Retired. Soviet project-186 class torpedo boats.
Patrol Boat
	Sibarau class	Australia	2	KRI Sibarau (847)	(847) Sank in December 2017.
	Sibarau class	Australia	2	KRI Siliman (848)	(848) Sank in September 2025.
	Andau class	Indonesia	1	KAL Andau	PC-30m boat believed to be a local copy of Attack-class patrol boat built by PT. Industri Kapal Indonesia in 1983. Washed ashore during 2018 Sulawesi earthquake and tsunami and successfully towed back to sea. Document related to sale of decommissioned KAL Andau appeared in Finance Ministry website lelang.go.id on February 11, 2021.
KAL Rajegwesi	KAL-28m class	Indonesia	1	KAL Pulau Pasoso	Badly damaged during 2018 Sulawesi earthquake and tsunami. Decommissioned and replaced by KAL Talise.
	Boa class	Indonesia	3	KAL Taliwangsa	All were decommissioned due to fatal accidents.
	Boa class	Indonesia	3	KAL Boiga	All were decommissioned due to fatal accidents.
	Boa class	Indonesia	3	KAL Matacora	All were decommissioned due to fatal accidents.
Submarine hunter Dorang, Jalesveva Jayamahe, p37	Kraljevica class	Yugoslavia	6	KRI Dorang	Retired
Submarine hunter Dorang, Jalesveva Jayamahe, p37	Kraljevica class	Yugoslavia	6	KRI Layang	Retired
Submarine hunter Dorang, Jalesveva Jayamahe, p37	Kraljevica class	Yugoslavia	6	KRI Bubara	Retired
Submarine hunter Dorang, Jalesveva Jayamahe, p37	Kraljevica class	Yugoslavia	6	KRI Lemadang	Retired
Submarine hunter Dorang, Jalesveva Jayamahe, p37	Kraljevica class	Yugoslavia	6	KRI Todak	Retired
Submarine hunter Dorang, Jalesveva Jayamahe, p37	Kraljevica class	Yugoslavia	6	KRI Krapu	Retired
	Pat class		6	Pat 01	
	Pat class		6	Pat 02	
	Pat class		6	Pat 03	
	Pat class		6	Pat 04	
	Pat class		6	Pat 05	
	Pat class		6	Pat 06	
	Balam class	Netherlands	6	KRI Balam (Note: Using current prefix of the Indonesian Navy)	
	Balam class	Netherlands	6	KRI Barau (Note: Using current prefix of the Indonesian Navy)	
	Balam class	Netherlands	6	KRI Bekaka (Note: Using current prefix of the Indonesian Navy)	
	Balam class	Netherlands	6	KRI Belatik (Note: Using current prefix of the Indonesian Navy)	
	Balam class	Netherlands	6	KRI Bendalu (Note: Using current prefix of the Indonesian Navy)	
	Balam class	Netherlands	6	KRI Boga (Note: Using current prefix of the Indonesian Navy)	
	Durian class	Netherlands	7	KRI Daik	Launched in 1952.
	Durian class	Netherlands	7	KRI Damara	Launched in 1952.
	Durian class	Netherlands	7	KRI Duata	Launched in 1952.
	Durian class	Netherlands	7	KRI Duku	Launched in 1952.
	Durian class	Netherlands	7	KRI Durian	Launched in 1952.
	Durian class	Netherlands	7	KRI Dagong	Launched in 1952.
	Durian class	Netherlands	7	KRI Data	Launched in 1952.
	Bango class	Netherlands	7	KRI Bango	All launched in 1952.
	Bango class	Netherlands	7	KRI Babut	All launched in 1952.
	Bango class	Netherlands	7	KRI Beo	All launched in 1952.
	Bango class	Netherlands	7	KRI Betet	All launched in 1952.
	Bango class	Netherlands	7	KRI Bido	All launched in 1952.
	Bango class	Netherlands	7	KRI Blekok	All launched in 1952.
	Bango class	Netherlands	7	KRI Blibis	All launched in 1952.
	Alkai class	Netherlands	12	KRI Alkai	Built in the Netherlands.
	Alkai class	Netherlands	12	KRI Alulu	Built in the Netherlands.
	Alkai class	Netherlands	12	KRI Ampis	Built in the Netherlands.
	Alkai class	Netherlands	12	KRI Ankang	Built in the Netherlands.
	Alkai class	Netherlands	12	KRI Antang	Built in the Netherlands.
	Alkai class	Netherlands	12	KRI Aryat	Built in the Netherlands.
	Alkai class	Netherlands	12	KRI Allap	Built in the Netherlands.
	Alkai class	Netherlands	12	KRI Ampok	Built in the Netherlands.
	Alkai class	Netherlands	12	KRI Andis	Built in the Netherlands.
	Alkai class	Netherlands	12	KRI Ankloeng	Built in the Netherlands.
	Alkai class	Netherlands	12	KRI Arokwes	Built in the Netherlands.
	Alkai class	Netherlands	12	KRI Attat	Built in the Netherlands.
	Merbabu class	Netherlands	2	KRI Merbabu	
	Merbabu class	Netherlands	2	KRI Rindjani	
	HDML class	United Kingdom; United States	25	PP 01	Built in 1943–1946, former British HDML and American Higgins type motor launches. Transferred to Indonesia in 1950.
	HDML class	United Kingdom; United States	25	PP 02	Built in 1943–1946, former British HDML and American Higgins type motor launches. Transferred to Indonesia in 1950.
	HDML class	United Kingdom; United States	25	PP 03	Built in 1943–1946, former British HDML and American Higgins type motor launches. Transferred to Indonesia in 1950.
	HDML class	United Kingdom; United States	25	PP 04	Built in 1943–1946, former British HDML and American Higgins type motor launches. Transferred to Indonesia in 1950.
	HDML class	United Kingdom; United States	25	PP 05	Built in 1943–1946, former British HDML and American Higgins type motor launches. Transferred to Indonesia in 1950.
	HDML class	United Kingdom; United States	25	PP 06	Built in 1943–1946, former British HDML and American Higgins type motor launches. Transferred to Indonesia in 1950.
	HDML class	United Kingdom; United States	25	PP 07	Built in 1943–1946, former British HDML and American Higgins type motor launches. Transferred to Indonesia in 1950.
	HDML class	United Kingdom; United States	25	PP 08	Built in 1943–1946, former British HDML and American Higgins type motor launches. Transferred to Indonesia in 1950.
	HDML class	United Kingdom; United States	25	PP 09	Built in 1943–1946, former British HDML and American Higgins type motor launches. Transferred to Indonesia in 1950.
	HDML class	United Kingdom; United States	25	PP 10	Built in 1943–1946, former British HDML and American Higgins type motor launches. Transferred to Indonesia in 1950.
	HDML class	United Kingdom; United States	25	PP 11	Built in 1943–1946, former British HDML and American Higgins type motor launches. Transferred to Indonesia in 1950.
	HDML class	United Kingdom; United States	25	PP 12	Built in 1943–1946, former British HDML and American Higgins type motor launches. Transferred to Indonesia in 1950.
	HDML class	United Kingdom; United States	25	PP 13	Built in 1943–1946, former British HDML and American Higgins type motor launches. Transferred to Indonesia in 1950.
	HDML class	United Kingdom; United States	25	PP 14	Built in 1943–1946, former British HDML and American Higgins type motor launches. Transferred to Indonesia in 1950.
	HDML class	United Kingdom; United States	25	PP 15	Built in 1943–1946, former British HDML and American Higgins type motor launches. Transferred to Indonesia in 1950.
	HDML class	United Kingdom; United States	25	PP 16	Built in 1943–1946, former British HDML and American Higgins type motor launches. Transferred to Indonesia in 1950.
	HDML class	United Kingdom; United States	25	PP 17	Built in 1943–1946, former British HDML and American Higgins type motor launches. Transferred to Indonesia in 1950.
	HDML class	United Kingdom; United States	25	PP 18	Built in 1943–1946, former British HDML and American Higgins type motor launches. Transferred to Indonesia in 1950.
	HDML class	United Kingdom; United States	25	PP 19	Built in 1943–1946, former British HDML and American Higgins type motor launches. Transferred to Indonesia in 1950.
	HDML class	United Kingdom; United States	25	PP 20	Built in 1943–1946, former British HDML and American Higgins type motor launches. Transferred to Indonesia in 1950.
	HDML class	United Kingdom; United States	25	PP 21	Built in 1943–1946, former British HDML and American Higgins type motor launches. Transferred to Indonesia in 1950.
	HDML class	United Kingdom; United States	25	PP 22	Built in 1943–1946, former British HDML and American Higgins type motor launches. Transferred to Indonesia in 1950.
	HDML class	United Kingdom; United States	25	PP 23	Built in 1943–1946, former British HDML and American Higgins type motor launches. Transferred to Indonesia in 1950.
	HDML class	United Kingdom; United States	25	PP 24	Built in 1943–1946, former British HDML and American Higgins type motor launches. Transferred to Indonesia in 1950.
	HDML class	United Kingdom; United States	25	PP 25	Built in 1943–1946, former British HDML and American Higgins type motor launches. Transferred to Indonesia in 1950.
	PGM 39 class	United States	3	KRI Bentang Kalakuan (570)	Retired in 1981–1982.
	PGM 39 class	United States	3	KRI Bentang Waitatiri (571)	Retired in 1981–1982.
	PGM 39 class	United States	3	KRI Bentang Silungkang (572)	Retired in 1981–1982.
Gun Boat
	Project 191M class	Soviet Union	10	KRI Batu Padas (Note: Using current prefix of the Indonesian Navy)	Commissioned on 12 October 1963.
	Project 191M class	Soviet Union	10	KRI Batu Parang (Note: Using current prefix of the Indonesian Navy)	Commissioned on 12 October 1963.
	Project 191M class	Soviet Union	10	KRI Ular Boa (Note: Using current prefix of the Indonesian Navy)	Commissioned on 12 October 1963.
	Project 191M class	Soviet Union	10	KRI Ular Laut (Note: Using current prefix of the Indonesian Navy)	Commissioned on 12 October 1963.
	Project 191M class	Soviet Union	10	KRI Ular Naga (Note: Using current prefix of the Indonesian Navy)	Commissioned on 12 October 1963.
	Project 191M class	Soviet Union	10	KRI Ular Puspa Kadjang (Note: Using current prefix of the Indonesian Navy)	Commissioned on 12 October 1963.
	Project 191M class	Soviet Union	10	KRI Ular Santja (Note: Using current prefix of the Indonesian Navy)	Commissioned on 12 October 1963.
	Project 191M class	Soviet Union	10	KRI Ular Sendok (Note: Using current prefix of the Indonesian Navy)	Commissioned on 12 October 1963.
	Project 191M class	Soviet Union	10	Unknown	Commissioned on 12 October 1963.
	Project 191M class	Soviet Union	10	Unknown	Commissioned on 12 October 1963.

== Amphibious Forces ==
Image	Class	Origin	Quantity	Ships	Notes
Landing Ship Tank
	Teluk Gilimanuk class	East Germany	3	KRI Teluk Berau (534); KRI Teluk Peleng (535); KRI Teluk Hading (538); KRI Teluk Jakarta (541)	(534) sank in 2012 after used as target ship for Yakhont missile during Armada Jaya XXXI Exercise. (535) foundered in November 2013 after a collision with concrete bollard. (538) sank in 2026 after used as target ship for Exocet missile during 2026 Joint Naval Operation Exercise. (541) taking water and sank after being hit by high waves near Kangean Island in July 2020.
	Teluk Semangka class	South Korea	3	KRI Teluk Semangka (512); KRI Teluk Penyu (513) KRI Teluk Mandar (514)	(512) used as target ship for Exocet & C-802 missiles during 2013 TNI Joint Exercise. (513) decommissioned on August 16, 2019. (514) decommissioned on January 27, 2022, following meeting between Defense minister and the House of Representatives.
RI Teluk Nangsa, Jalesveva Jayamahe, p65	Teluk Langsa class	United States	10	KRI Teluk Langsa (501); KRI Teluk Bayur (502); KRI Teluk Kau (504); KRI Teluk Manado (505); KRI Teluk Tomini (508); KRI Teluk Ratai (509); KRI Teluk Saleh (510); KRI Teluk Bone (511); KRI Tandjung Nusanive (887); KRI Tandjung Radja	Former USN LST(2) type tank landing ships. (509) Ex- USS Presque Isle (APB-44) (511) Ex- USS Iredell County (LST-839); Decommissioned on August 15, 2019.
	Polnocny class	Soviet Union	1	KRI Teluk Parigi	Retired.
Landing Craft Utility
	Teluk Wadjo class	Yugoslavia	4	KRI Teluk Wadjo (860); KRI Teluk Weda (861); KRI Teluk Katurai (862); KRI Teluk Wori (863)	Yugoslav made small LCT. Retired.
	LSSL class	United States	6	LSSL-2; LSSL-4; LSSL-9; LSSL-10; LSSL-28; LSSL-80	Ex-US LCS-L, transferred from US in 1951.
	Dore class	Austria	3	KRI Dore; KRI Amurang; KRI Banten	Built in 1968 by Korneuburg Shipyard, Austria. Retired.
	Amahai class	Netherlands	5	KRI Amahai (Note: Using current prefix of the Indonesian Navy); KRI Marich; KRI Piru; KRI Baruna; KRI Namlea	Ex-US supplied LCI. Retired as of 1974.
	Kupang class	Indonesia	3	KRI Kupang (582); KRI Dili (583); KRI Nusa Utara (584)	Built by PT PAL based on modified LCU 1610 design. (582) decommissioned in 2015. (584) decommissioned on August 16, 2019.

== Support Ship ==
Image	Class	Origin	Quantity	Ships	Notes
Troopship
	Ambulu class	Germany	3	KRI Karang Tekok (982) KRI Karang Banteng (983); KRI Karang Galang (984); KRI Karang Unarang (985)	Lurssen built Ambulu-class Fast Ferry. (983) decommissioned in 2014. later used as target ship for two Exocet missiles and two C-802 Missiles. (984) decommissioned in 2008 (985) transferred to Sangihe region to serve as commercial ship. (982) decommissioned on 16 April 2021.
		Germany	1	KRI Tanjung Pandan (971)	Ex-TS Pretoria/KM Gunung Djati, Retired.
		Netherlands	1	KRI Tanjung Oisina (972)	Ex-Prinses Irene, Retired.
KRI Tanjung Nusanive		Germany	2	KRI Tanjung Nusanive (973); KRI Tanjung Fatagar (974)	(973) Ex-KM Kambuna, decommissioned on 24 January 2020. (974) Ex-KM Rinjani, decommissioned in 2014.
Replenishment Oiler
	Sorong class	Yugoslavia	1	KRI Sorong (911)	Decommissioned on 27 October 2021.
	Uda class	Soviet Union	3	KRI Balikpapan (951); KRI Pangkalan Brandan; KRI Wonokromo	Transferred to Indonesia in 1962. Retired.
		Sweden	1	KRI Tjepu (901) (Note: Using current prefix of the Indonesian Navy)	Built in Sweden in 1949. Retired.
		Singapore	1	KRI Pladju (902) (Note: Using current prefix of the Indonesian Navy)	Bought from Singapore in 1958. Retired.
		Japan	2	KRI Balikpapan (901); KRI Sambu (902)	Copy of Khobi-class built by Ujima Shipyard, Japan in 1965. Transferred to Indonesia on March 7, 1978. (901) decommissioned on November 6, 2019. (902) decommissioned on August 16, 2019, and used as a target ship for Exocet missile during TNI Yudha Dharma joint exercise 2019.
	Khobi class	Soviet Union	1	KRI Pakan Baru (909)	Bought in 1959. Retired.
	Drogobitz class	Soviet Union; Finland	2	KRI Bunju (904); KRI Sambu (905)	Built by Rauma-Repola Shipyard, Finland for Soviet Union in 1955. Transferred to Indonesia in 1959 and later sold to a Singapore company by 1969.
		Soviet Union; Poland	2	KRI Tarakan; KRI Bula	Polish built, design B-74 "Ogre" type tanker. Received in 1962. Retired.
Lighthouse Tender
		Netherlands	1	KRI Biduk (Note: Using current prefix of the Indonesian Navy)	Lighthouse Tender, Cable Layer, and multipurpose naval auxiliary. Commissioned in 1952. Retired.
Submarine Tender
	Atrek class	Soviet Union	1	KRI Thamrin	Retired.
	Don class	Soviet Union	1	KRI Ratulangi	Retired.
Dry Cargo Support Ship
		Soviet Union; Hungary	2	KRI Banggai; KRI Nusa Telu (952)	Ex Hungarian ship, acquired in the mid-1950s.
Unidentified Indonesian ship, Jalesveva Jayamahe, p36		Indonesia	2	KRI Halmahera (921); KRI Morotai (922)	Handed over to Indonesian Government on November 23, 1957, as a result of martial law decree (Staat van Oorlog en Beleg) on March 14, 1957. Fully transferred to Indonesian Navy in 1965 from PT. INACO due to bankruptcy.
	Talaud class	Soviet Union; Hungary	5	KRI Talaud (951); KRI Natuna (953); KRI Karamundsa (957); KRI Karimata (960)	(960) decommissioned in May 2016 due to fire damage. The ship later used as a target for C-705 missile and SUT torpedo in September 2016.
	Waigeo class	Indonesia	1	KRI Waigeo (961)	(961) decommissioned in 2018.
Repair Ship
	Achelous class	United States	1	KRI Jaya Wijaya (921)	Ex-USS Askari (ARL-30). Retired.
Destroyer Depot Ship
USS Tidewater (AD-31) underway at sea on 16 March 1965 (KN-12874)	Shenandoah class	United States	1	KRI Dumai (652)	Ex-USS Tidewater (AD-31). Retired.
Training Boat
		Indonesia	1	KAL Kadet-1	
Research Ship
		Netherlands	1	KRI Aries (Note: Using current prefix of the Indonesian Navy)	Ex-Samudera, Commissioned in 1952. Retired.
		Netherlands	1	KRI Burudjamhal (1702)	Retired.
		Japan	1	KRI Djalanidhi (1705)	Retired.
		East Germany	1	KRI Burudjulasad (1006)	Retired.
Salvage Ship
		Japan	1	KRI Triton (926)	Ex-Matsunoura Maru.
Firefighting Boat
	Pozharny-I class	Soviet Union	1	KRI Rawa Pening	Transferred in 1962.
Fleet Tugs
	Cherokee class	United States	1	KRI Rakata (922)	ex-USS Menominee, decommissioned in 2003. The ship later sunk as missiles and torpedoes target during firing exercise in 2004. The ship received multiple direct hit from anti-ship missile and SUT Torpedo.
		Japan	1	KRI Lampo Batang (934)	Ocean Tug. Commissioned in November 1961.
		Japan	2	KRI Tambora (935); KRI Bromo (936)	Harbor Tug. Commissioned in 1961.
	Tugur class	Soviet Union	2	KRI Dempo; KRI Mutis	Harbor Tug. Soviet Project 730 class tugs.
Hydrofoil
Princesse Stpehanie	Bima Samudera class	United States	3	Bima Samudera I Bima Samudera II; Bima Samudera III	Retired on early 2000s.

== See also ==
- List of active Indonesian Navy ships

== Bibliography ==
- Blackman, Raymond, ed. (1954). Jane's Fighting Ships 1953-54. London, UK: Sampson Low, Marston & Co., Ltd.
- Blackman, Raymond, ed. (1962). Jane's Fighting Ships 1962-63. London, UK: Jane's Fighting Ships Publishing Co., Ltd.
- Moore, John Evelyn, ed. (1974). Jane's Fighting Ships 1974-75. New York, USA: Franklin Watts.
- Moore, John Evelyn, ed. (1981). Jane's Fighting Ships 1981-82. London, UK: Jane's Fighting Ships Publishing Co., Ltd.
- Moore, John Evelyn, ed. (1984). Jane's Fighting Ships 1984-85. London, UK: Jane's Fighting Ships Publishing Co., Ltd.
- Sharpe, Richard, ed. (1989). Jane's Fighting Ships 1989-90. London, UK: Jane's Information Group.
- Sauders, Stephen, ed. (2004). Jane's Fighting Ships 2004-2005. London, UK: Jane's Information Group.
- Sauders, Stephen, ed. (2009). Jane's Fighting Ships 2009-2010. London, UK: Jane's Information Group.
- Gardiner, Robert; Chumbley, Stephen, eds. (1995). Conway's All the World's Fighting Ships 1947–1995. Annapolis, Maryland, USA: Naval Institute Press. ISBN 1-55750-132-7.
