= USS LST-1128 =

LST-542-class landing ship tank

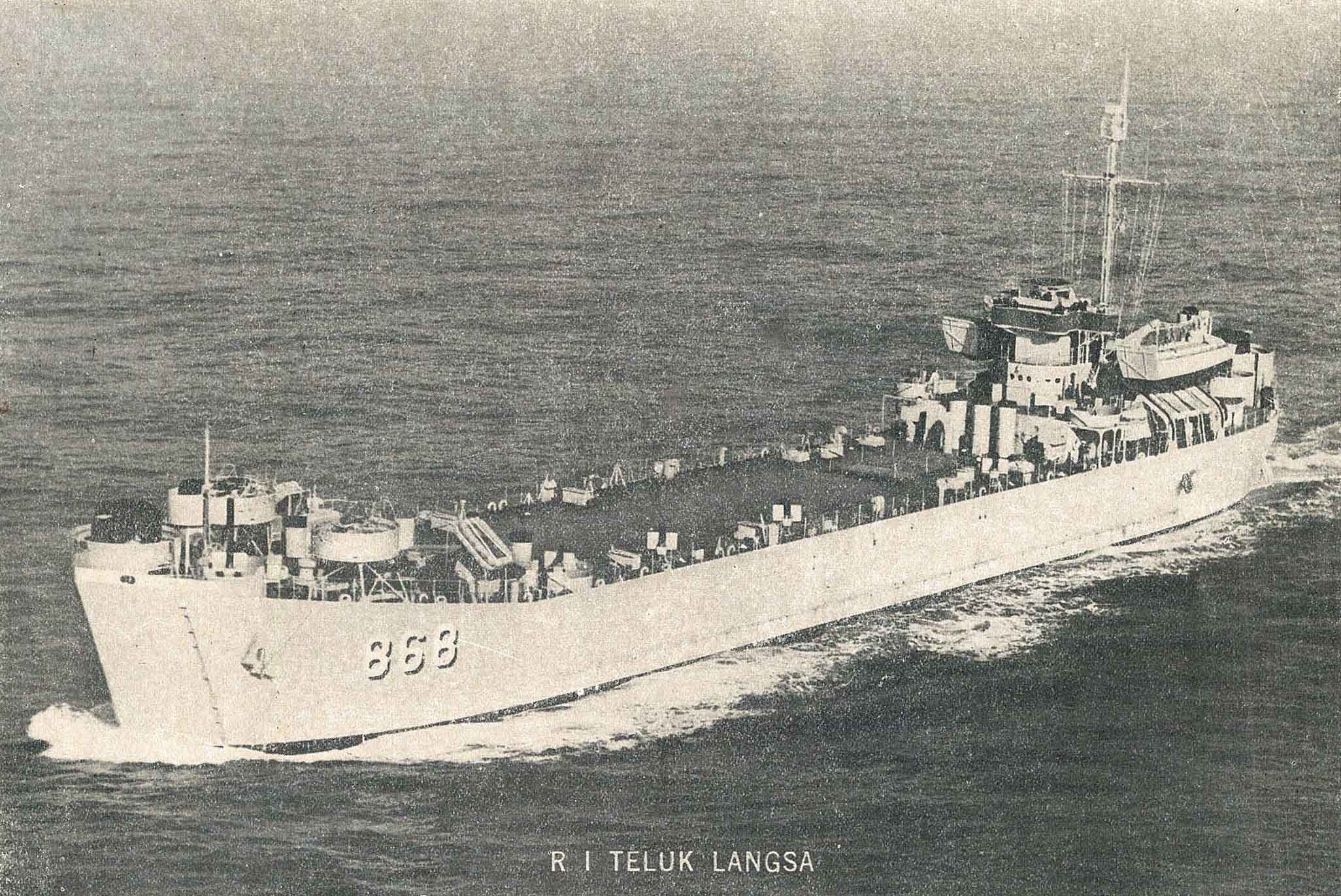
- RI Teluk Langsa c. 1960s

History

United States
- Name: LST-1128
- Builder: Chicago Bridge and Iron Company, Seneca
- Laid down: 23 November 1944
- Launched: 19 February 1945
- Sponsored by: Mrs. Marie Staat
- Commissioned: 9 March 1945
- Decommissioned: 29 July 1946
- Renamed: Solano County, 1 July 1955
- Namesake: Solano County
- Stricken: 1 November 1958
- Identification: Pennant number: LST-1128; Callsign: NBOB
- Fate: Transferred to Indonesia, 1960

Indonesia
- Name: Teluk Langsa
- Namesake: Langsa Bay
- Acquired: 31 March 1960
- Commissioned: 16 August 1960
- Decommissioned: 3 May 2012
- Home port: Tanjung Priok, Jakarta
- Identification: Pennant number: 868, 501
- Fate: Scrapped, May 2012

General characteristics
- Class & type: LST-542-class tank landing ship; Teluk Langsa-class tank landing ship
- Displacement: 1,625 long tons (1,651 t) light; 4,080 long tons (4,145 t) full
- Length: 328 ft (100 m)
- Beam: 50 ft (15 m)
- Draft: Unloaded : 2 ft 4 in (0.71 m) forward; 7 ft 6 in (2.29 m) aft; Loaded : 8 ft 2 in (2.49 m) forward; 14 ft 1 in (4.29 m) aft
- Propulsion: 2 × General Motors 12-567 diesel engines, two shafts, twin rudders
- Speed: 12 knots (22 km/h; 14 mph)
- Boats & landing craft carried: 2 × LCVPs
- Troops: 16 officers, 147 enlisted men
- Complement: 7 officers, 104 enlisted men
- Sensors & processing systems: on KRI Teluk Langsa; SO-6 surface search and navigation radar
- Armament: as USS LST-1128; 8 × 40 mm guns; 12 × 20 mm guns; as KRI Teluk Langsa; 7 × 40 mm guns; 2 × 20 mm guns

USS Solano County (LST-1128) was a LST-542-class tank landing ship in the United States Navy during World War II. She was transferred to the Indonesian Navy as KRI Teluk Langsa.

== Construction and commissioning ==
LST-1128 was laid down on 23 November 1944 at Chicago Bridge and Iron Company, Seneca, Illinois. She was launched on 19 February 1945, sponsored by Mrs. Marie Staat and commissioned on 9 March 1945.

=== Service in United States Navy ===
USS LST-1128 sailed down the Illinois and Mississippi rivers to New Orleans. She then moved to Mobile, Alabama, on 16 March, to have a propeller changed, and then conducted her shakedown training at Panama City, Florida, from 23 March to 5 April. Her tank deck was loaded with overseas cargo at Gulfport, Mississippi, from 6 to 9 April, after which she moved to New Orleans for repairs and supplies. On 19 April, the LST sailed for Hawaii via the Panama Canal and arrived at Pearl Harbor on 15 May.

LST-1128 got underway for Guam on 5 June and proceeded via Kwajalein, Marshall Islands. She unloaded the tank deck cargo at Guam from 25 June to 30 July and then moved to Saipan on the 31st. The war ended with the LST at anchor there, so she loaded Army troops and equipment destined for Okinawa and sailed on 21 August. She unloaded at Buckner Bay and reloaded with trucks and equipment for Korea. LST-1128 arrives at Jinsen on 12 September, offloaded cargo, and began the return voyage to Okinawa on the 23rd.

The ship remained at Okinawa from 27 September through 20 October and weathered a violent typhoon in Naha Harbor with no major damage. The ship transported another load of cargo to Jinsen on 29 October and then moved to the island of Saishu, south of Korea. There, she embarked 1,400 Japanese prisoners of war and returned them to Sasebo, Japan, on 2 November. LST-1128 returned to Jinsen on 7 December and then sailed to Manila. She remained there from 15 to 26 December 1945 when she started another trip to Jinsen. She performed occupation duty in the Far East and saw service in China. She departed from Korea in January 1946 for home via Pearl Harbor. Upon her arrival on the West Coast, she was routed to Bremerton for a pre-inactivation yard overhaul. She was assigned to the Pacific Reserve Fleet and berthed at Columbia River, Oregon after her decommissioning on 29 July 1946.

On 1 July 1955, she was given the name Solano County.

She was struck from the Navy list on 1 November 1958. Under provisions of the Military Assistance Program, she was transferred to the Indonesia on 31 March 1960, and served as RI Teluk Langsa (868).

=== Service in Indonesian Navy ===
On 1 July 1961, Teluk Langsa participated in the exercise Komando Lintas Laut Militer (Kolinlamil) off Tanjung Priok.

In mid 1970s, she was reclassified as KRI Teluk Langsa (501).

The ship participated in Operation Seroja, the invasion of East Timor to oust Fretilin regime. Teluk Langsa, along with KRI Teluk Tomini, Teluk Kau and Teluk Amboina transported elements of Pasukan Marinir 2 (Pasmar 2 / 2nd Marine Troops) from Surabaya to the operational area in early December 1975. Teluk Langsa departed Surabaya for Dili on 3 December at 17:00 UTC+7 carrying 275 troops, 5 PT-76 amphibious tanks, 10 BTR-50 amphibious APCs, 2 122 mm howitzers, and 2 K-61 amphibious vehicles. She arrived at Dili on 8 December at 18:00 UTC+8.

The ship transported logistics to areas affected by 2004 Indian Ocean earthquake and tsunami. On 9 January 2005, her together with KRI Teluk Banten landed at beach in Calang, Aceh Jaya Regency to evacuate the survivors and provide relief supplies. On 8 February, Teluk Langsa alongside KRI Teluk Ratai landed again at Calang to deliver parts of three bailey bridges that will be used to connect road access from Banda Aceh and Meulaboh to the town that were cut off by the tsunami.

At the end of 2008, she carried out a troop shift operation for the 320th Infantry Battalion "Badak Putih" of Siliwangi Military Command with a force of 649 troops and their combat equipment under the Battalion Commander Lt. Col. (Infantry) Basuki after they finished their security assignment in the Indonesia–Papua New Guinea border area and returned to their main base at the Siliwangi Military Command.

KRI Teluk Langsa, Teluk Kau and Teluk Tomini, which were based at Jakarta, and KRI Teluk Saleh, based at Surabaya, was simultaneously decommissioned and stricken on 3 May 2012. Previously, they were already placed in reserve status. They were planned to be replaced by Teluk Bintuni-class tank landing ship. Teluk Langsa was scrapped after some time.

In January 2021, a miniature bow of the ship was reconstructed at the Komando Pembinaan Doktrin, Pendidikan dan Latihan Angkatan Laut (Kodiklatal / Navy Doctrine Development, Education and Training Command). It was placed in front of the flagpole of the Ki Hadjar Dewantara Building at Kodiklatal HQ in Bumimoro, Krembangan District, Surabaya.

== Awards ==
LST-1128 have earned the following awards:

- China Service Medal (extended)
- American Campaign Medal
- Asiatic-Pacific Campaign Medal
- World War II Victory Medal
- Navy Occupation Service Medal (with Asia clasp)

== Gallery ==
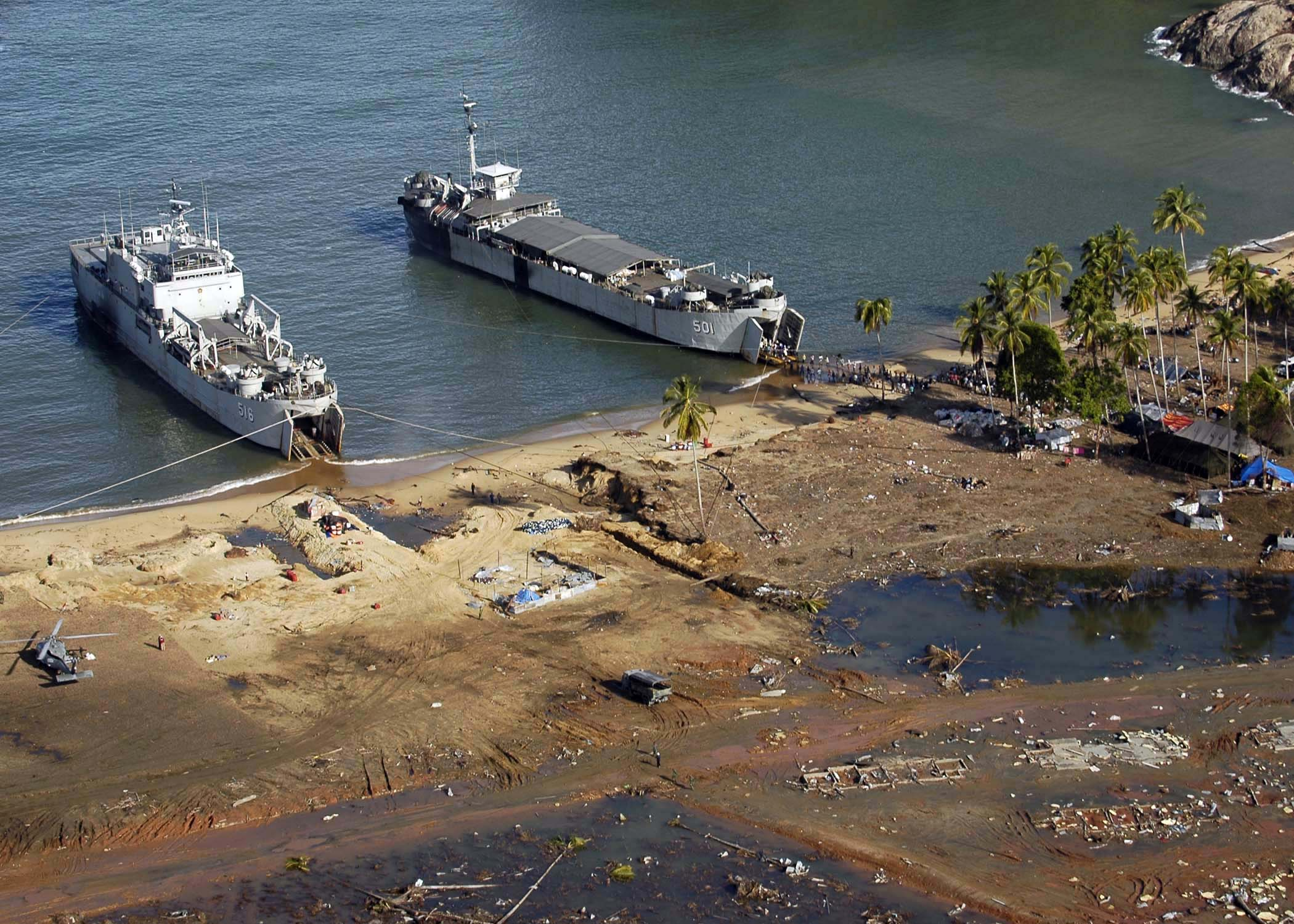
KRI Teluk Langsa and KRI Teluk Banten in 2005
