= KRI Teluk Amboina =

Indonesian tank landing ship launched 1961

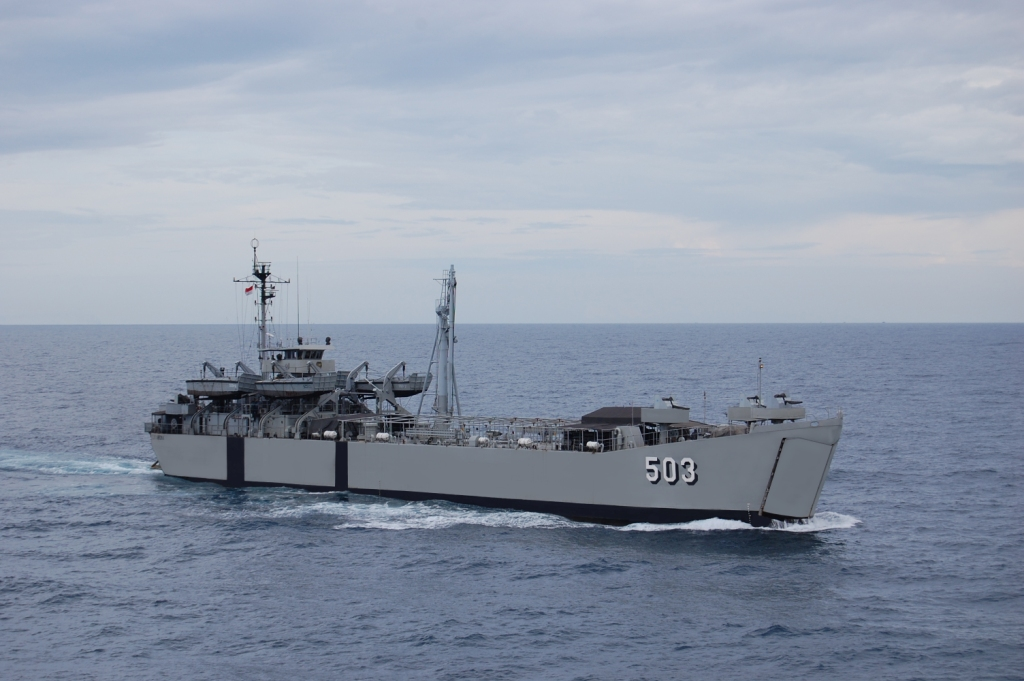
- KRI Teluk Amboina

History

Indonesia
- Name: Teluk Amboina
- Namesake: Ambon Bay
- Builder: Sasebo Heavy Industries, Sasebo, Japan
- Laid down: 14 October 1960
- Launched: 17 March 1961
- Completed: June 1961
- Commissioned: 2 August 1961
- Identification: Pennant number: 869, 503
- Motto: Sorengpati Dlajah Ing Segara; (Javanese: the Brave Knight, Explorer of Ocean)
- Status: Active

General characteristics
- Class & type: LST-542-class tank landing ship; Teluk Langsa-class tank landing ship
- Displacement: 2,378 long tons (2,416 t) standard; 4,200 long tons (4,300 t) full
- Length: 99.7 m (327 ft)
- Beam: 15.3 m (50 ft)
- Draught: 4.6 m (15 ft)
- Installed power: 3,425 metric horsepower (2.519 MW)
- Propulsion: 2 × MAN V6V 22/30 diesel engines; 2 × shaft
- Speed: 13.1 knots (24.3 km/h)
- Range: 4,000 nautical miles (7,400 km) at 13.1 knots (24.3 km/h)
- Boats & landing craft carried: 4 × LCVPs
- Capacity: 212 troops and 2,100 t cargo or; 610 personnel or; 32 jeeps and 18 trucks or; 17 light tanks
- Complement: 88
- Armament: 6 × single 37 mm/67 70-K

KRI Teluk Amboina is a tank landing ship (LST) of the Indonesian Navy. The ship was built at Sasebo Heavy Industries, Japan and completed in 1961. Its design is a copy of LST-542-class LST, albeit faster than the original. As of 2020, Teluk Amboina is the oldest ship in commission with the Indonesian Navy.

== Characteristics ==
The ship design is the same as the LST-542-class tank landing ship. It has a length of 99.7 m (327 ft), a beam of 15.3 m (50 ft), with a draught of 4.6 m (15 ft) and her displacement are 2,378 long tons (2,416 t) standard and 4,200 long tons (4,300 t) at full load. The ship is powered by two MAN V6V 22/30 diesel engines, with total power output of 3,425 metric horsepower (2.519 MW) distributed in two shaft. The ship has a range of 4,000 nautical miles (7,400 km) while cruising at 13.1 knots (24.3 km/h).

Teluk Amboina has a capacity of 212 troops, 2,100 long tons (2,100 t) of cargo, and 4 LCVPs on davits. The ship is also able to carry either 610 personnel, 1,000 t (980 long tons) of cargo, 32 jeeps and 18 trucks, or 17 light tanks. She has a complement of 88 personnel and equipped with a 30-ton crane forward of the bridge. Teluk Amboina was initially armed with two 85 mm guns and four 40 mm anti-aircraft guns, and then it consisted of four 40 mm and an 37 mm anti-aircraft guns. Later she is equipped with six 37 mm anti-aircraft guns in single mount.

== Service history ==
The ship was built by Sasebo Heavy Industries, Sasebo and started construction on 14 October 1960. She was launched on 17 March 1961, then completed and transferred to Indonesian Navy in June 1961. The ship set sail to Indonesia on 6 July 1961 and then formally commissioned on 2 August 1961, assigned with pennant number 869.

In late 1961 until mid 1962, Teluk Amboina took part in Operation Trikora, a planned operation to seize and annex Netherlands New Guinea.

She also participated in Operation Seroja, the invasion of East Timor to oust Fretilin regime. Teluk Amboina, along with KRI Teluk Langsa, Teluk Kau and Teluk Tomini transported elements of Pasukan Marinir 2 (Pasmar 2 / 2nd Marine Troops) from Surabaya to the operational area in early December 1975. Teluk Amboina departed Surabaya for Dili on 6 December at 18:30 UTC+7 carrying 226 troops, 5 PT-76 amphibious tanks, 8 BTR-50 amphibious APCs, 2 K-61 amphibious vehicles, 14 BM-14-17 rocket artillery and 4 ZIL-164 trucks.

In 1977, she was assigned to Jakarta Military Sealift Unit of Komando Lintas Laut Militer (Kolinlamil / Military Sealift Command) and around the same time, her pennant number were changed to 503.

Aside from its primary purpose as amphibious warfare ship, Teluk Amboina also carried out other duties such as transporting troops and materials to and from Indonesian borders with Malaysia and East Timor. It also transport troops, materials and vehicles of the Security of Prone Area Task Force (Satgas Pamrahwan) to Maluku and North Maluku.

In the aftermath of 2004 Indian Ocean earthquake and tsunami, Teluk Amboina distributed foods and waters, clothes, tarpaulins, toiletries, fuels, medicines and body bags to the West Aceh Regency areas. She also took part in relief efforts after 2018 Lombok earthquake, transporting personnel and materials from the 12th Construction Engineers Battalion "Karana Jaya" of the Indonesian Army Corps of Engineers to participate in Quick Response Task Force for Disaster Management in Lombok. The ship departed Tanjung Priok on 23 September 2018.

On 17 March 2020, the ship's crews commemorate the 59th anniversary of KRI Teluk Amboina since it was launched in 1961. The simple event was also attended by the Commander of the Jakarta Military Sealift Unit.

On 9 April 2020 at 14:40 UTC+7, Teluk Amboina caught on fire while docked at Pier 9 on Kolinlamil Headquarters in Tanjung Priok. The first firefighters from Sector II Koja Fire Station arrived on 14:45. In total 11 fire engines were deployed and the firefighting efforts was concluded on 16:13. The preliminary speculation is that the fire was caused by welding works. In early July, the ship undergo maintenance at Port of Tanjung Emas, Semarang.
