= USS LST-356 =

1942 LST-1-class tank landing ship

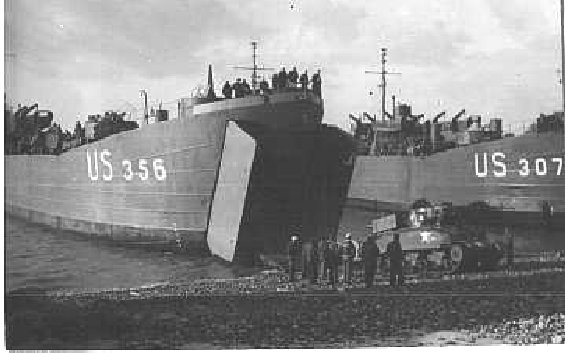
- LST-356 and LST-307 beached, date and location unknown.

History

United States
- Name: LST-356
- Builder: Charleston Navy Yard
- Laid down: 7 September 1942
- Launched: 16 September 1942
- Sponsored by: Mrs. Harold Rivington Parker
- Commissioned: 22 December 1942
- Decommissioned: 2 July 1946
- Renamed: Bledsoe County, 1 July 1955
- Namesake: Bledsoe County
- Stricken: 1 September 1960
- Identification: Pennant number: LST-356; Callsign: NZBA
- Honors and awards: 3 battle stars (WWII)
- Fate: Sold for scrapping, 8 March 1961, but entered commercial service instead

Indonesia
- Name: Teluk Tomini
- Namesake: Gulf of Tomini
- Acquired: 9 February 1967
- Decommissioned: 3 May 2012
- Stricken: 3 May 2012
- Home port: Tanjung Priok
- Identification: IMO number: 5159832; Pennant number: 508
- Fate: Scrapped, May 2012

General characteristics
- Class & type: LST-1-class tank landing ship; Teluk Langsa-class tank landing ship
- Displacement: 1,625 long tons (1,651 t) light; 4,080 long tons (4,145 t) full
- Length: 328 ft (100 m)
- Beam: 50 ft (15 m)
- Draft: Unloaded: Bow: 2 ft 4 in (0.71 m); Stern: 7 ft 6 in (2.29 m); Loaded : Bow: 8 ft 2 in (2.49 m); Stern: 14 ft 1 in (4.29 m)
- Depth: 8 ft (2.4 m) forward; 14 ft 4 in (4.37 m) aft (full load)
- Propulsion: 2 General Motors 12-567 diesel engines, two shafts, twin rudders
- Speed: 12 knots (22 km/h; 14 mph)
- Boats & landing craft carried: Two or six LCVPs
- Troops: 14–16 officers, 131–147 enlisted men
- Complement: 7–9 officers, 104–120 enlisted men
- Sensors & processing systems: on KRI Teluk Tomini; AN/SPS-21 surface search and navigation radar
- Armament: as USS LST-356; 2 × twin 40 mm gun mounts w/Mk.51 directors; 4 × single 40 mm gun mounts; 12 × single 20 mm gun mounts; as KRI Teluk Tomini; 8 × single 37 mm gun mounts

USS LST-356 was an LST-1-class tank landing ship built for the United States Navy during World War II. She earned three battle stars during the war and was decommissioned in July 1946. In July 1955, she was assigned the name USS Bledsoe County (LST-356) in honor of Bledsoe County, Tennessee, but never saw active service under that name. Bledsoe County was struck from the Naval Vessel Register in September 1960 and sold for scrapping in March 1961. She was apparently sold into commercial service in 1962 instead, serving under several names over the next five years. In 1967, she was acquired by the Indonesian Navy and renamed KRI Teluk Tomini (508). In 2012, the ship was decommissioned and scrapped.

== Service history ==
LST-356 was laid down on 7 September 1942 at the Charleston Navy Yard; launched on 16 September 1942; sponsored by Mrs. Harold Rivington Parker; and commissioned on 22 December 1942.

=== Mediterranean, 1943–1944 ===
Following shakedown in Chesapeake Bay and post-shakedown repairs at the New York Navy Yard, LST-356 set out for the coast of Africa on 19 March 1943. She stopped at Bermuda between 23 and 27 March and reached Senegal on 13 April. From there, she moved north and entered the Mediterranean Sea. For the next few weeks, she conducted shuttle runs between ports on the North African coast (Oran, Arzew, Tunis, and Bizerte) before she took part in "Operation Husky" – the invasion of Sicily. For that assault, she beached at Beach Blue Two, in the "Cent" area on the afternoon of 10 July and unloaded her embarked tanks and other vehicles within an hour. Then, she turned to the task of unloading ammunition, gasoline, and general stores until directed to retract and lie to offshore. During the retraction phase, though, LST-356 grounded on a sandbar on her port bow, rupturing a fuel tank in the auxiliary engine room. However, she managed to struggle free under her own power in about 20 minutes and then proceeded to the transport area.

The following day, she resumed unloading, using her boats in the effort. Later, on the 12th, she assisted the Charles Carroll (APA-28) in unloading her cargo despite frequent interruptions by enemy air raids. Beaching again on the 13th, the tank landing ship, helped by Army engineers, started to unload the remainder of her own cargo, and her crew completed the job on the 14th. Over the ensuing weeks, LST-356 voyaged thrice to Sicilian ports bringing supplies into Scoglitti, Gela, and Palermo. During this time, she also carried a cargo of radar equipment and night fighter directing gear to the island of Ustica, some 40 miles (64 km) north-northwest of Palermo. Before the year was out, the ship took part in her second amphibious action, "Operation Avalanche", the invasion at Salerno, Italy. She arrived in the Gulf of Salerno on D-Day, 9 September, and immediately commenced discharging DUKWs. Upon completing this task some 40 minutes later, she lay to, ramp and bow doors secured, to await orders. During that period of inactivity, enemy planes appeared overhead, and the tank landing ship's gunners joined in the fire to drive them off.

LST-356 launched pontoons and arrived off the beaching area at noon. She approached the beach under fire from shore batteries. Unloading her vehicles swiftly, LST-356, still under fire, retracted from the beach without difficulty suffering neither damage nor casualties. After retrieving her boats and embarking German prisoners of war, she returned to the rendezvous area. Underway again, LST-356, configured with a "flight deck," began launching the first of four United States Army Piper L-4A "Grasshoppers" for liaison missions. As she increased speed to flank, the first L-4A took off, but narrowly missed the guardrail to the forecastle-mounted 40-millimeter mount. The second took off two minutes later, but it struck the guardrail and fell into the sea off the starboard bow. Executing hard right rudder and stopping her engines, LST-356 swung to starboard to avoid running down the splashed "Grasshopper." Fortunately, a boat from the Procyon (AKA-2) picked up the Army pilot, and the attack transport took him on board and treated his injuries. Determining the runway to be faulty, Lieutenant Jacquemot and the officer in charge of the planes decided against launching the other two L-4As. For the rest of the day and throughout the night, LST-356 remained in the vicinity, her crew at general quarters because of periodic enemy air attacks.

On the 10th, LST-356 set out in convoy for Bizerte and thereafter conducted follow-up trips from Bizerte to Salerno; Tripoli to Salerno; and Bizerte to Taranto, lifting both American and British troops and equipment. While engaged in one such mission on 15 September, LST-356 came under "extremely heavy enemy shore-based gunfire" off Green Beach in the northern attack area. Shells landed on both sides of the ship, under the stern and on the beach immediately off the ramp; but, except for a British Army passenger who suffered a severe leg wound, those embarked in LST-356 again came through without a scratch.

=== Invasion of France, 1944–1945 ===
Leaving the Mediterranean in the fall of 1943, LST-356 proceeded to England, where she spent the ensuing months refitting and training for the Normandy invasion. While not part of the initial phase of "Operation Neptune," she did take part in follow-up action. She sortied from the Thames in convoy, and arrived off Sword Beach early on the evening of 14 June, streaming her barrage balloon "to lethal height," and made smoke during dusk and evening hours. Although sporadic air attacks punctuated the night, she withheld her fire in accordance with instructions from the beachhead commander.

The following day, LST-356 and six other American LST's received orders to proceed to "Queen Red" beach. An hour after high tide, the tank landing ship still had 10 feet (3.0 m)of water at the ramp's end, making it obvious "...that we would have to dry out in order to discharge our troops and vehicles." About an hour later, while waiting for the tide to recede, LST-356 observed shellfire down the beach, from the direction of the Orne River, where the Germans were known to have placed artillery batteries. Within half an hour, the fire crept up the beach and began to fall close aboard. For the next four hours, LST-356 lay exposed to the enemy guns, unable to return fire in her own defense since her 3-inch gun had been removed during the recent refit. Around noon, the tide had withdrawn enough to permit unloading; but a shell crater directly in front of the ramp held that task up until a woven steel mat was bridged the hole and allowed the first of 47 Canadian Army vehicles to cross it shoreward. Lieutenant Blanco made all passengers take cover behind the superstructure or under the trucks, and ordered his crew to remain under cover as much as their duties permitted. As a result, there were no casualties. Within 50 minutes of the start, all vehicles had left the ship, and LST-356 proceeded to the anchorage. A short time later, however, more long-range enemy shelling compelled her to move back out to sea, but not before a shell had whistled directly over her bow and penetrated the side of LST-360. In all, five LSTs took hits from the German guns and suffered damage. Between June 1944 and April 1945, LST-356 carried 39 loads of men and material across the English Channel.

=== Decommissioning and sale, 1945–1967 ===
Sent home in May 1945 for a thorough overhaul, she remained at the Hoboken, New Jersey yards of the Bethlehem Steel Company, undergoing repairs and alterations until the end of July 1945. Clearing New York on 9 August, LST-356 conducted post-overhaul shakedown in Chesapeake Bay until late August. The tank landing ship then visited New York City from 21 to 29 August. At the end of August, she sailed from New York on her way to deactivation in Florida. Pausing at Hampton Roads from 30 August to 13 September, the tank landing ship continued via Morehead City, North Carolina to Jacksonville, Florida. Reporting to the 16th Fleet on 26 September 1945 LST-356 was decommissioned on 2 July 1946 and was berthed with the Atlantic Reserve Fleet at Green Cove Springs, Florida. Although named USS Bledsoe County (LST-356) on 1 July 1955 the tank landing ship never returned to active service. Her name was struck from the Naval Vessel Register on 1 September 1960 and she was sold to the Mechanical Equipment Company of New Orleans on 8 March 1961 for scrapping. Instead of being scrapped, she entered commercial service as MV Brunei and later as Liberian-flagged MV Inagua Crest. Along with MV Inagua Shipper, Inagua Foam and Honduran-flagged MV Cal-Agro, Inagua Crest were chartered by Military Sea Transportation Service in November 1962 to transport military cargo and passengers.

=== Indonesian Navy service, 1967–2012 ===
On 9 February 1967, MV Inagua Crest and MV Inagua Shipper were acquired by the Indonesian Navy and renamed as KRI Teluk Tomini (508) and KRI Teluk Ratai (509) respectively. She was assigned to Komando Lintas Laut Militer (Kolinlamil / Military Sealift Command). As a former merchant ship, Teluk Tomini was rearmed with six, later increased to eight, Soviet 70-K 37 mm anti-aircraft guns in single mount. She was also equipped with AN/SPS-21 surface search and navigation radar.

The ship participated in Operation Seroja, the invasion of East Timor to oust Fretilin regime. Teluk Tomini, along with KRI Teluk Langsa, Teluk Kau and Teluk Amboina transported elements of Pasukan Marinir 2 (Pasmar 2 / 2nd Marine Troops) from Surabaya to the operational area in early December 1975. Teluk Tomini departed Surabaya for Dili on 6 December at 22:00 UTC+7 carrying 162 troops, 5 REO M35 trucks, 1 Toyota jeep and some logistics support equipments.

KRI Teluk Langsa, Teluk Kau and Teluk Tomini, which were based at Jakarta, and KRI Teluk Saleh, based at Surabaya, was simultaneously decommissioned and stricken on 3 May 2012. Previously, they were already placed in reserve status. They were planned to be replaced by Teluk Bintuni-class tank landing ship. After decommissioned, there was a plan to save Teluk Tomini from scrapping and converting it into floating museum about the ship's own history. It was planned to moored her at Taman Impian Jaya Ancol. The plan fell through and by 16 May, Teluk Tomini was already being broken up at a ship-breaker in Cilincing.

== Awards ==
As LST-356, the ship earned three battle stars during World War II. She also earned the following awards:

Combat Action Ribbon with one gold star
American Campaign Medal	European–African–Middle Eastern Campaign Medal with three battle stars	World War II Victory Medal
