= Teluk Langsa-class tank landing ship =

Class of landing ship tanks of the Indonesian Navy

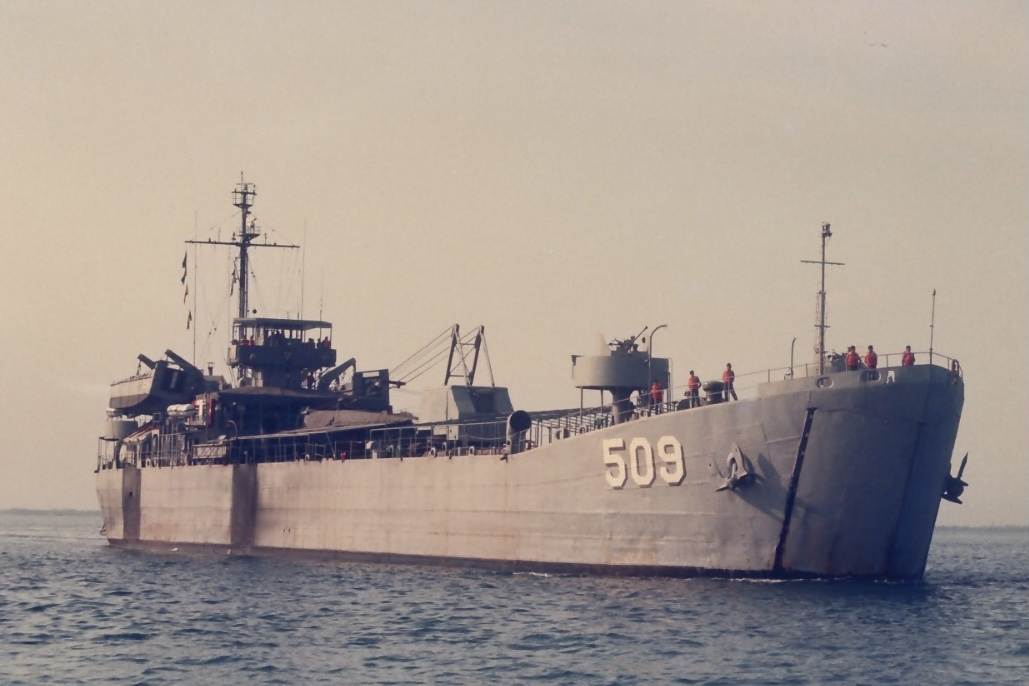
- KRI Teluk Ratai

Class overview
- Name: Teluk Langsa class
- Builders: Chicago Bridge and Iron Co.; Charleston Naval Shipyard; American Bridge Company; Dravo Corporation
- Operators: Indonesian Navy
- Succeeded by: Teluk Semangka class
- Subclasses: LST-1 class; LST-542 class
- Built: 1942–1945
- In commission: 1961–present
- Completed: 10
- Retired: 10

General characteristics
- Type: Landing ship tank
- Displacement: 1,625 long tons (1,651 t) light; 4,080 long tons (4,145 t) full
- Length: 328 ft (100 m)
- Beam: 50 ft (15 m)
- Draft: Unloaded : 2 ft 4 in (0.71 m) forward; 7 ft 6 in (2.29 m) aft; Loaded : 8 ft 2 in (2.49 m) forward; 14 ft 1 in (4.29 m) aft
- Propulsion: 2 × General Motors 12-567 diesel engines, two shafts, twin rudders
- Speed: 12 knots (22 km/h; 14 mph)
- Boats & landing craft carried: 2 × LCVPs
- Troops: 16 officers, 147 enlisted men
- Complement: 7 officers, 104 enlisted men
- Sensors & processing systems: SO-6 surface search and navigation radar
- Armament: 7 × Bofors 40 mm guns; 2 × Oerlikon 20 mm cannons

The Teluk Langsa-class tank landing ship was a class of tank landing ships which were operated by the United States Navy during World War II but were later transferred and sold to the Indonesian Navy in the 1960s and 1970s.

== Design ==
The ships were all differently built on subclasses which were the LST-1 and LST-542. Additionally, Teluk Amboina was a copy of the LST-542 variant built by Sasebo Heavy Industries after World War II. There are ten ships in this class. Jaya Wijaya was the half sister to these ships as she was converted to an Achelous-class repair ship.

Vessels of the class have a length of 328 ft (100 m), a beam of 50 ft (15 m), and a draft from 2 ft (0.61 m) to 14 feet (4.3 m). Their displacement is 4,080 long tons (4,150 t) at full load. The ships are powered by two diesel engines with two shafts. The Teluk Langsa class has a speed of 12 knots (22 km/h).

The Teluk Langsa class has a capacity of 163 troops, 1,900 long tons (1,900 t) of cargo, and two LCVPs on davits. The ships have a complement of 104 personnel, including 7 officers.

In 1980, it was stated that Teluk Amboina received an upgrade in weaponry, namely the installation of six Bofors 40/60 MK3 guns. As a landing ship, Teluk Amboina is equipped with four units of LCVP (Landing Craft, Vehicle, Personnel) and 20 medium tanks.

== Fate ==
On 18 March 2011, Teluk Bayur was decommissioned and then sunk as target on 20 April. Teluk Langsa, Teluk Kau, Teluk Tomini and Teluk Saleh were simultaneously decommissioned on 3 May 2012 and scrapped in the same month.

== Ships in the class ==
Teluk Langsa class
Hull no.	Name	Builder	Laid down	Launched	Commissioned	Decommissioned
501	Teluk Langsa	Chicago Bridge and Iron Company	23 November 1944	19 February 1945	16 August 1960	3 May 2012
502	Teluk Bayur	Chicago Bridge and Iron Company	12 February 1944	12 May 1944	17 June 1961	19 March 2011
504	Teluk Kau	Chicago Bridge and Iron Company	24 July 1944	19 October 1944	17 June 1961	19 March 2011
505	Teluk Manado	American Bridge Company	16 December 1943	25 February 1944	1961	1983
508	Teluk Tomini	Charleston Navy Yard	7 September 1942	16 September 1942	9 February 1967	3 May 2012
509	Teluk Ratai	American Bridge Company	29 April 1944	16 June 1944	9 February 1967	15 August 2019
510	Teluk Saleh	Chicago Bridge and Iron Company	21 October 1943	4 March 1944	1979	1995
511	Teluk Bone	American Bridge Company	25 September 1944	12 November 1944	July 1970	15 August 2019
887	Tandjung Nusanive	Dravo Corporation	27 August 1944	7 October 1944	December 1960	1974
2	Tandjung Radja	American Bridge Company	28 December 1944	24 February 1945	1961	1963
