= USS LST-616 =

LST-542-class landing ship tank

History

United States
- Name: LST-616
- Builder: Chicago Bridge and Iron Company, Seneca
- Laid down: 12 February 1944
- Launched: 12 May 1944
- Commissioned: 29 May 1944
- Decommissioned: 19 January 1946
- Renamed: Q019; T-LST-616
- Stricken: 1 May 1961
- Identification: Callsign: NFEH
- Fate: Transferred to Indonesia, 1961

Indonesia
- Name: Teluk Bayur
- Namesake: Bayur Bay
- Acquired: 1961
- Commissioned: 17 June 1961
- Decommissioned: 19 March 2011
- Home port: Tanjung Priok, Jakarta
- Identification: Pennant number: 502
- Fate: Sunk as target, 2012

General characteristics
- Class & type: LST-542-class tank landing ship; Teluk Langsa-class tank landing ship
- Displacement: 1,625 long tons (1,651 t) light; 4,080 long tons (4,145 t) full
- Length: 328 ft (100 m)
- Beam: 50 ft (15 m)
- Draft: Unloaded : 2 ft 4 in (0.71 m) forward; 7 ft 6 in (2.29 m) aft; Loaded : 8 ft 2 in (2.49 m) forward; 14 ft 1 in (4.29 m) aft
- Propulsion: 2 × General Motors 12-567 diesel engines, two shafts, twin rudders
- Speed: 12 knots (22 km/h; 14 mph)
- Boats & landing craft carried: 2 × LCVPs
- Troops: 16 officers, 147 enlisted men
- Complement: 7 officers, 104 enlisted men
- Sensors & processing systems: on KRI Teluk Bayur; AN/SPS-21 surface search and navigation radar
- Armament: as USS LST-616; 8 × 40 mm guns; 12 × 20 mm guns; as KRI Teluk Bayur; 8 × single 37 mm gun mounts

USS LST-616 was a LST-542-class tank landing ship in the United States Navy during World War II. She was transferred to the Indonesian Navy as KRI Teluk Bayur (502).

== Construction and commissioning ==
LST-616 was laid down on 12 February 1944 at Chicago Bridge and Iron Company, Seneca, Illinois. Launched on 12 May 1944 and commissioned on 29 May 1944.

=== Service in United States Navy ===
During World War II, LST-616 was assigned to the Asiatic-Pacific theater and participated in the assault and occupation of Okinawa Gunto from 26 March to 29 April 1945. She was then assigned to the occupation and China service in the Far East from 23 September 1945 until her decommissioning on 19 January 1946 in which she was assigned to Commander Naval Forces Far East (COMNAVFE) Shipping Control Authority for Japan (SCAJAP), redesignated Q019.

Transferred to the Military Sea Transportation Service (MSTS), 31 March 1952 and placed in service as USNS T-LST-616. Placed out of service and struck from the Naval Register, 1 May 1961.

Under provisions of the Military Assistance Program, she was transferred to the Indonesia in 1961, and served as Teluk Bayur (502).

=== Service in Indonesian Navy ===
On 17 June 1961, she was put into service with the Indonesian Navy.

For first time, the ship's commander was under Marine Major (P) Handayana Sukendar. The ship entered to strengthen elements of the Military Seaborne Command in 1975, and was under the daily guidance of the Surabaya Military Seaborne Unit (Satlinlamil).

She was decommissioned on 19 March 2011.

The ship was disposed of in an Indonesian Navy SINKEX on 20 April 2012.

The shipwreck of the former KRI Teluk Bayur, which has sunk in the waters of Merak, Banten, has been successfully recycled by personnel from the Lantamal V Surabaya Base Facilities Service (Disfaslan) into objects that can be used again. Namely being a land generator, by utilizing a generator from the wreckage of a ship that sank after being targeted by a Yakhont missile, which was tested after buying it from Russia, several years ago.

== Awards ==
LST-616 have earned the following awards:

- China Service Medal (extended)
- American Campaign Medal
- Europe-Africa-Middle East Campaign Medal
- Asiatic-Pacific Campaign Medal (1 battle star)
- World War II Victory Medal
- Navy Occupation Service Medal (with Asia clasp)

== Sources ==
- United States. Dept. of the Treasury (1962). Treasury Decisions Under the Customs, Internal Revenue, Industrial Alcohol, Narcotic and Other Laws, Volume 97. U.S. Government Printing Office.
- Moore, Capt. John (1984). Jane's Fighting Ships 1984-85. Jane's Information Group. ISBN 978-0710607959.
- Saunders, Stephen (2009). Jane's Fighting Ships 2009-2010. Jane's Information Group. ISBN 978-0710628886.
- Fairplay International Shipping Journal Volume 222. United Kingdom: Fairplay Publishing Limited. 1967.
- Haryadi, Letkol. (Mar.) Yosafat Robert (2019). Sejarah Kavaleri Korps Marinir (in Indonesian). Surabaya: Penerbit Karunia. ISBN 978-979-9039-97-2.
