= USS Russell County =

LST-542-class landing ship tank

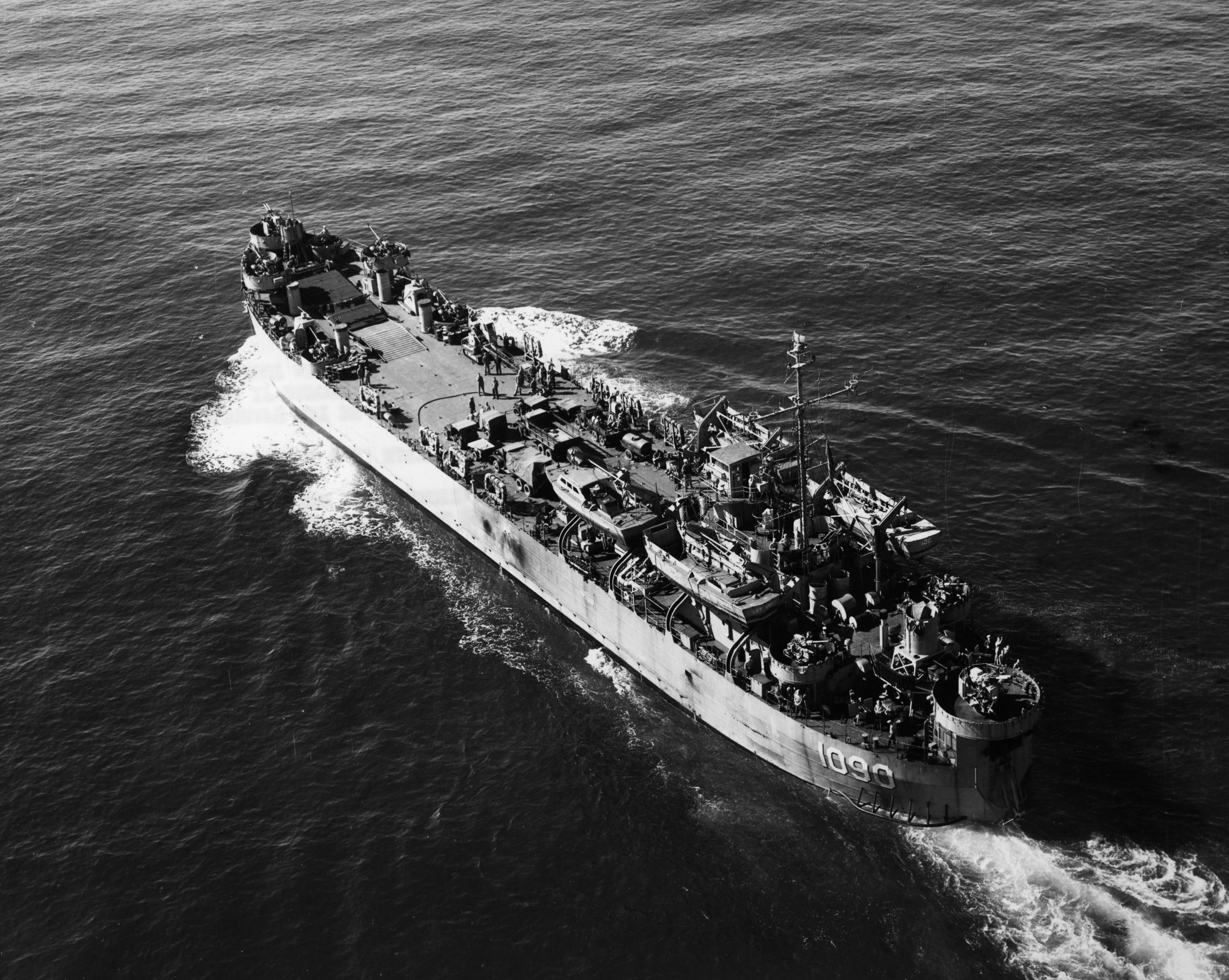
- USS Russell County

History

United States
- Name: LST-1090
- Builder: American Bridge Company, Ambridge
- Laid down: 28 December 1944
- Launched: 24 February 1945
- Sponsored by: Mrs R. B. Hunter
- Commissioned: 2 April 1945
- Decommissioned: 22 July 1946
- Recommissioned: 3 November 1950
- Decommissioned: 1 July 1955
- Renamed: Russell County
- Namesake: Russell County
- Stricken: 1 November 1960
- Identification: Callsign: NAPU; Pennant number: LST-1090
- Fate: Transferred to Indonesia, 1961

Indonesia
- Name: Tandjung Radja
- Namesake: Cape Raja
- Acquired: 1961
- Home port: Tanjung Priok, Jakarta
- Identification: Pennant number: 2
- Fate: Wrecked after grounding, 1963

General characteristics
- Class & type: LST-542-class tank landing ship; Teluk Langsa-class tank landing ship
- Displacement: 1,625 long tons (1,651 t) light; 4,080 long tons (4,145 t) full
- Length: 328 ft (100 m)
- Beam: 50 ft (15 m)
- Draft: Unloaded : 2 ft 4 in (0.71 m) forward; 7 ft 6 in (2.29 m) aft; Loaded : 8 ft 2 in (2.49 m) forward; 14 ft 1 in (4.29 m) aft
- Propulsion: 2 × General Motors 12-567 diesel engines, two shafts, twin rudders
- Speed: 12 knots (22 km/h; 14 mph)
- Boats & landing craft carried: 2 × LCVPs
- Troops: 16 officers, 147 enlisted men
- Complement: 7 officers, 104 enlisted men
- Sensors & processing systems: on KRI Tandjung Radja; AN/SPS-21 surface search and navigation radar
- Armament: as USS LST-1090; 8 × 40 mm guns; 12 × 20 mm guns; as KRI Tandjung Radja; 8 × single 37 mm gun mounts

USS Russell County (LST-1090) was a LST-542-class tank landing ship in the United States Navy during World War II. She was transferred to the Indonesian Navy as KRI Tandjung Radja (2).

== Construction and commissioning ==
LST-1090 was laid down on 28 December 1944 at American Bridge Company, Ambridge, Pennsylvania. Launched on 24 February 1945 and commissioned on 2 April 1945.

=== Service in United States Navy ===
During World War II, LST-1090 was assigned to the Asiatic-Pacific theater. She then participated in the occupation service in the Far East from 20 September 1945 until 4 January 1946.

She was decommissioned on 22 July 1946 at Vancouver, Washington and laid up in the Pacific Reserve Fleet, Columbia River Group.

She was recommissioned for the Korean War, 3 November 1950, at Puget Sound Naval Shipyard, Bremerton, Washington.

From 7 to 9 April 1951, she participated in the First UN Counter Offensive. From 1 to 7 September, Communist China Spring Offensive and UN Summer-Fall Offensive.

She also took part in the Third Korean Winter from 14 to 26 March and 7 to 30 April 1953. Korean Summer-Fall, from 1 to 2 May, 16 to 18 June and 20 to 27 July 1953.

Under provisions of the Military Assistance Program, she was transferred to the Indonesia in 1961, and served as Tandjung Radja (2).

=== Service in Indonesian Navy ===
In 1973, she was severely damaged after being grounded.

== Awards ==
LST-1090 have earned the following awards:

- American Campaign Medal
- Asiatic-Pacific Campaign Medal
- World War II Victory Medal
- Navy Occupation Service Medal (with Asia clasp)
- National Defense Service Medal
- Philippines Liberation Medal
- Korean Service Medal (5 battle stars)
- United Nations Service Medal
- Republic of Korea War Service Medal (retroactive)
