= USS Lawrence County =

WWII US naval vessel

- USS Lawrence County (LST-887) underway

History

United States
- Name: USS LST-887
- Builder: Dravo Corporation, Pittsburgh
- Laid down: 27 August 1944
- Launched: 7 October 1944
- Sponsored by: Mrs. F. J. Conroy
- Commissioned: 7 November 1944
- Decommissioned: 23 July 1946
- Recommissioned: 3 November 1950
- Renamed: USS Lawrence County (LST-887), 1 July 1955
- Namesake: counties in Alabama, Arkansas, Illinois, Indiana, Kentucky, Mississippi, Missouri, Ohio, Pennsylvania, South Dakota, and Tennessee
- Decommissioned: 22 March 1960
- Stricken: 1 November 1960
- Honors and awards: 1 battle star (World War II); 3 battle stars (Korea)
- Fate: Sold to Indonesia, December 1960

Indonesia
- Name: KRI Tandjung Nusanive (887)
- Namesake: Cape Nusanive, Ambon, Maluku
- Acquired: December 1960
- Stricken: 1974
- Fate: Unknown

General characteristics
- Class & type: LST-542-class tank landing ship; Teluk Langsa-class tank landing ship
- Displacement: 1,625 long tons (1,651 t) light; 4,080 long tons (4,145 t) full
- Length: 328 ft (100 m)
- Beam: 50 ft (15 m)
- Draft: Unloaded : 2 ft 4 in (0.71 m) forward; 7 ft 6 in (2.29 m) aft; Loaded : 8 ft 2 in (2.49 m) forward; 14 ft 1 in (4.29 m) aft
- Propulsion: 2 × General Motors 12-567 diesel engines, two shafts, twin rudders
- Speed: 12 knots (22 km/h; 14 mph)
- Boats & landing craft carried: 2 × LCVPs
- Troops: Approximately 130 officers and enlisted men
- Complement: 8-10 officers, 89-100 enlisted men
- Armament: 8 × 40 mm guns; 12 × 20 mm guns

USS Lawrence County (LST-887) was a LST-542-class tank landing ship built for the United States Navy during World War II. Named after counties in eleven U.S. states, she was the only U.S. Naval vessel to bear the name.

Originally laid down as LST-887 by the Dravo Corporation of Pittsburgh, Pennsylvania on 27 August 1944; launched on 7 October 1944, sponsored by Mrs. F. J. Conroy; and commissioned at New Orleans, Louisiana on 7 November 1944.

== Service history ==
=== World War II, 1944–1945 ===
After shakedown out of St. Andrew's Bay, Florida LST-887 departed New Orleans on 10 December and steamed to San Diego, where she arrived the 31st to unload bulk cargo. Thence she reached Seattle, Washington on 13 January 1945; and, after embarking Army engineers and support equipment, she sailed in convoy for Pearl Harbor on 10 February. There she embarked Seabees following her arrival on 22 February, and on 4 March she joined a convoy bound for the western Pacific. After touching at Eniwetok and Saipan, LST-887 departed the Marianas on 26 March for the invasion of Okinawa.

Assigned to the Southern Defense Group of the Southern Attack Force, she closed beach Orange I on 2 April and began discharging troops and equipment. During the next two weeks she operated in Okinawan waters making a cargo shuttle run to Kerama Retto and back 9 to 10 April and providing smoke cover for American ships during Japanese air attacks. Between 12 and 15 April LST-887 took part in repelling three enemy air strikes. While laying smoke on 12 April, she shot down an enemy dive bomber. As the aircraft dove for the SS Minot Victory, her 40 mm and 20 mm guns repeatedly hit the kamikaze which splashed close board the merchantman.

Sailing in convoy on 16 April, LST-887 reached Ulithi, Carolines, the 23rd. Between 10 May and 9 June she steamed via the Admiralties and the Russell Islands to Guadalcanal and transported troops and equipment via Eniwetok to Guam. Thence, after loading 4,400 drums of gasoline at Saipan, she returned to Okinawa on 26 June and exchanged her cargo of fuel for one of tanks and amphibious vehicles. On the Fourth of July she sailed once again for the Marianas, arriving Guam six days later. During the closing days of the War in the Pacific and over the next two months LST-887 continued supply and ferry runs among and out of the Marianas.

=== Post-war activities, 1945–1946 ===
In addition to cruises between Guam and Saipan, she steamed to Peleliu, Palaus, and back between 27 August and 6 September. Thence, with occupation troops embarked, she cleared Saipan in convoy on 17 September and steamed to Japan, arriving at Nagasaki, Kyūshū, the 24th. Between 28 September and 25 October she steamed to the Philippines and carried additional troops to Mitsuhama, Shikoku. The LST returned to Manila Bay on 6 November and during the next month transported troops and equipment from Mangarin Bay, Mindoro to Batangas, Luzon. LST-887 returned to Manila on 9 December and, after embarking troops for passage to the United States, she sailed on 14 December. Steaming via Guam and Pearl Harbor, she reached San Francisco on 30 January 1946.

She remained there until 2 April when she sailed for Astoria, Oregon. She arrived on 5 April, moved to Portland, Oregon on the 9th, and from 13 June to 22 July underwent inactivation at Vancouver, Washington. LST-887 decommissioned at Portland on 23 July 1946 and entered the Pacific Reserve Fleet.

=== Korean War, 1950–1953 ===
LST-887 recommissioned at Bremerton, Washington on 3 November 1950. She sailed to San Diego between 29 November and 6 December and, following shakedown and training, she departed on 21 March 1951 for the Far East. Steaming via Pearl Harbor, she reached Yokosuka, Japan on 26 April and four days later began cargo and training runs along the Japanese coast. Early in September she joined the seaborne supply line in support of American forces fighting Communist aggression in South Korea. Between 4 and 14 September she carried troops and cargo out of Sasebo to Kangnung, South Korea. After completing additional cargo operations among the islands of Kyūshū, Honshū, and Hokkaidō she again steamed to Korea on 21 December. She reached Inchon the 28th, debarked her troops, and during the next two weeks operated along the western coast of Korea.

She returned to Yokosuka on 17 January 1952, thence from 10 February to 8 March steamed via Pearl Harbor to San Diego. LST-887 deployed to the Far East on 25 August; and, upon arriving Yokosuka on 8 October, she resumed cargo runs among the Japanese islands. She renewed her logistics duty from Japan to Korea on 10 December when she departed Otaru, Hokkaidō to carry troops and equipment to Pusan. She returned to Yokosuka via Otaru on 23 December. During the next three months additional shuttle runs out of Otaru and Yokosuka sent her to Inchon and along the Korean coast to Koje Do. After returning to Yokosuka on 2 April 1953, she departed on 18 April for the west coast and reached San Diego on 16 May. After the cessation of hostilities on 27 July 1953, LST-887 between 31 July and 25 August steamed to Japan. There she embarked returning troops at Nagoya and Yokosuka and sailed for the United States on 3 September, via Hawaii, arriving San Diego on 12 October.

=== Far East deployments, 1954–1959 ===
Following overhaul and training. LST-887 again deployed to the Far East on 27 March 1954 and arrived Yokosuka on 3 May via Pearl Harbor and Guam. During the next three months she steamed out of Yokosuka along the Japanese coast and to Korea and Okinawa in support of American training and readiness operations. Departing Japan on 17 August, she steamed to Southeast Asia to support the "Operation Passage to Freedom" from North Vietnam to South Vietnam. Between 30 August and 20 September she made four voyages out of Haiphong to Nha Trang and Tourane carrying French troops and equipment. After departing Vietnam on 26 September, she steamed via Yokosuka and Pearl Harbor to San Diego, where she arrived on 7 November.

Between 13 March 1955 and 14 May 1957 the ship made two more deployments to the Far East (while operating out of Yokosuka she was named USS Lawrence County (LST-887) on 1 July 1955). Training and logistics duty in support of the 7th Fleet sent her from Japan to Okinawa, Hong Kong, and the Philippines. In addition, she made periodic runs out of Yokosuka to Sasebo and Nagoya.

Following the completion of her Far East deployment in 1957, Lawrence County continued cargo and training voyages out of San Diego to U.S. Pacific bases. She trained in Hawaiian waters during July and August, and she steamed the Pacific coast to Kodiak, Alaska, and back between 30 September and 10 November. She returned to the Hawaiian Islands on 5 April 1958 for operations out of Pearl Harbor until sailing for the Marshalls on 7 May. Between 21 May and 18 June she provided logistics support during 11 nuclear test shots of "Operation Hardtack I". Thence, she departed Eniwetok on 22 June and arrived San Diego via Pearl Harbor on 19 July.

Lawrence County returned to Pearl Harbor on 6 May 1959 and resumed passenger and cargo runs to Pacific bases. She sailed for Midway on 9 May and operated there until returning to Pearl Harbor on 24 June. Between 13 August and 30 October she cruised to Wake Island, Eniwetok, and Ponape to shuttle cargo. Departing Pearl Harbor on 2 November, she reached San Diego on 19 November.

=== Decommissioning and sale ===
Lawrence County operated at San Diego until sailing for Astoria, Oregon, on 24 February 1960. She arrived the 29th and decommissioned there on 22 March 1960. She was placed in the Columbia River Group, Pacific Reserve Fleet, and was struck from the Naval Vessel Register on 1 November 1960. In December 1960 she was sold to Indonesia under terms of the Foreign Assistance Sales Program for service in the Indonesian Navy as KRI Tandjung Nusanive (887). Deleted from the Indonesian Navy Vessel Register in 1974, her final fate is unknown.

== Awards ==
LST-887 received one battle star for World War II and three battle stars for Korean War service.
