= KRI Teluk Karimata =

Dry cargo support ships of Indonesian Navy

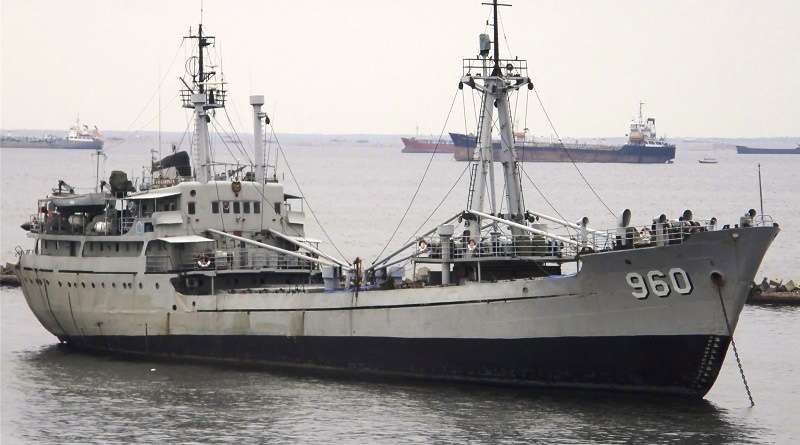
- KRI Teluk Karimata (960)

History

Indonesia
- Name: Teluk Karimata
- Namesake: Karimata Bay
- Operator: Military Sealift Command
- Builder: Angyalföld Shipyard, Budapest, Hungary
- Yard number: 2035
- Completed: 1964
- Commissioned: 18 March 1965
- Decommissioned: 15 August 2016
- Home port: Tanjung Priok
- Identification: IMO number: 6413950; Pennant number: 960
- Fate: Sunk as target, November 2017

General characteristics
- Class & type: Tisza-class coastal cargo ship
- Type: Dry cargo support ship
- Displacement: 2,400 long tons (2,400 t) full load
- Length: 78.8 m (259 ft)
- Beam: 10.8 m (35 ft)
- Draft: 4.6 m (15 ft)
- Propulsion: 1 × MAN 5-cyl diesel; 1 × shaft
- Speed: 12 knots (22 km/h; 14 mph)
- Range: 3,000 nautical miles (5,600 km) at 11 knots (20 km/h)
- Capacity: 875 long tons (889 t) dry cargo; 11 long tons (11 t) liquid cargo
- Troops: 250
- Complement: 26
- Sensors & processing systems: Radar: Spin trough, I-band
- Armament: 2 × 12.7 mm 2M-7 twin-barrel machine guns

KRI Teluk Karimata (960) is a dry cargo support ship of the Indonesian Navy.

== Development and design ==
KRI Teluk Karimata is a Hungarian Tisza-class coastal cargo ship, the design of which is based on the Soviet Keyla class. It has a length of 78.8 m (259 ft), a beam of 10.8 m (35 ft), with a draft of 4.6 m (15 ft) and her displacement is 2,400 long tons (2,400 t) at full load. The ship is powered by a MAN 5-cylinders diesel engine, with total power output of 1,000 metric horsepower (0.74 MW) distributed in one shaft. The ship has a speed of 12 knots (22 km/h), with range of 3,000 nautical miles (5,600 km) while cruising at 11 knots (20 km/h).

The ship is a cargo coaster ship with a dead weight of 1,828 tonnes has the main task of being a logistics transport ship in its duties as a supporting element of military sea transportation. This ship has three spacious cargo holds and also equipped with six cranes for loading and unloading cargo.

Teluk Karimata has a complement of 26 personnel, with cargo capacity of 875 long tons (889 t) of dry cargo and 11 long tons (11 t) of liquid cargo. She also able to transport 250 fully-equipped troops. The ship is armed with two 12.7 mm heavy machine guns in 2M-7 twin mounts, located on the port and starboard side of the ship. In addition, it is equipped with individual weapons in the form of the Soviet-made AK-47.

== Construction and career ==
Teluk Karimata was built in 1964 by Angyalföld Unit of Hungarian Shipyard & Crane Factory in Budapest, Hungary. The vessel was commissioned on 18 March 1965 Komando Lintas Laut Militer (Kolinlamil / Military Sealift Command).

Referring to her history, the ship was brought in related to the preparation for Operation Trikora in the 1960s. Judging from the year of her arrival, the ship was sent to Indonesia after Operation Trikora was concluded, due to a peace agreement with the Dutch over Papua.

Throughout her service, the ship has contributed to the nation and state in carrying out operational tasks, both in war military operations and military operations other than war as well as other service operations, including the 2004 Tsunami Social Assistance Operation in Aceh.

She also participated in the 2013 Rakata Jaya Operation in the Sulawesi region and Expeditionary Operations. Unitary State of the Republic of Indonesia in 2014 in the East Nusa Tenggara region.

In July 2014, the ship in the waters of the Java Sea had held a skilled test exercise, including anti-air, anti-surface, the role of passing through minefields, damage control, overboard rescue, in addition to that, her equipments were also tested in readiness of the software faced with operating tasks according to its basic function.

The ship carried out a combat capability test of his crew during their voyage in Karimun Jawa waters to Jakarta after supporting the shift of materials and troops from the Special Forces Command (Kopassus) in the context of the Expeditionary Operation of the Republic of Indonesia (NKRI) to the East, Wednesday 1 April 2015.

On Saturday, 7 May 2016, the ship was docked at the Indonesian Navy Base Pondok Dayung, Tanjung Priok, North Jakarta, experienced a fire that caused extensive damage. Though in the incident the ship did not burn out, it started to list due to the water being sprayed from PT Pelindo II tugboats to extinguish the flames. She was decommissioned later that year on 15 August.

On 17 November 2017, she was towed out to sea off Bali as a target ship for other Indonesian Navy vessels. She served as a target for C-705 missiles from KRI Clurit and KRI Kujang, as well as torpedoes from the submarine KRI Nanggala. The ship was torpedoed and sunk on 27 November 2017.

== Gallery ==
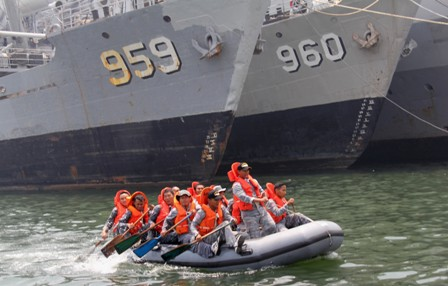
KRI Mentawai and KRI Karimata on 5 September 2012

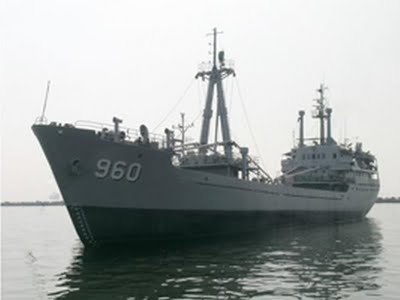
KRI Karimata on 30 April 2013

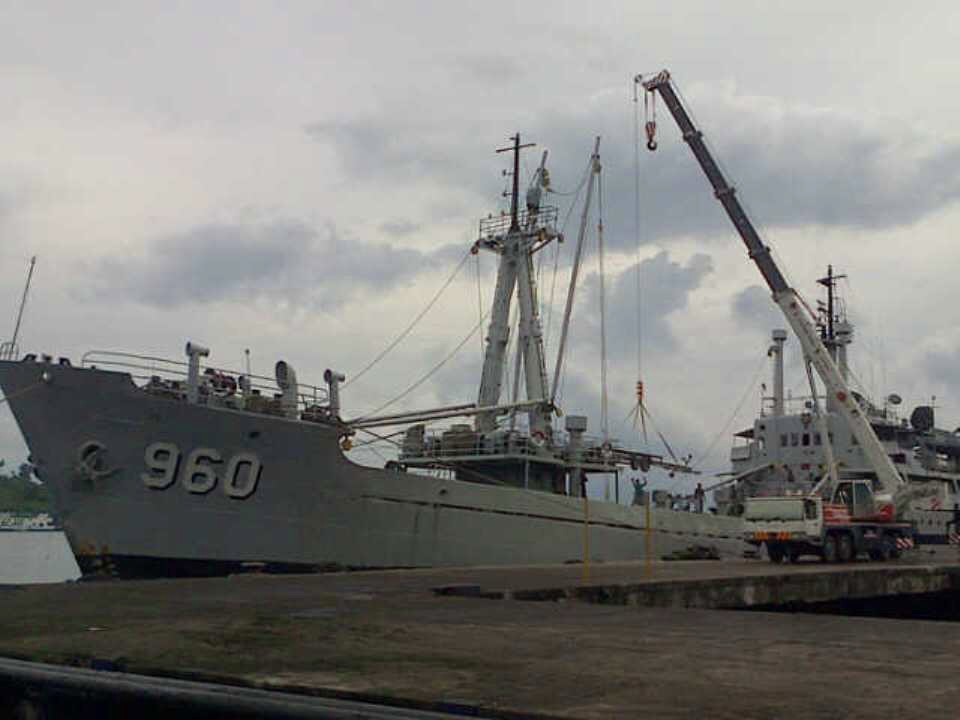
KRI Karimata on 14 June 2013
