= USS Iredell County =

1944 LST-542-class tank landing ship

- Iredell County beached on the LST ramp at Da Nang in the Republic of Vietnam, 1967

History

United States
- Name: LST-839
- Builder: American Bridge Company, Ambridge
- Laid down: 25 September 1944
- Launched: 12 November 1944
- Commissioned: 6 December 1944
- Decommissioned: 24 July 1946
- Renamed: Iredell County, 1 July 1955
- Namesake: Iredell County
- Recommissioned: 18 June 1966
- Decommissioned: 15 July 1970
- Stricken: February 1979
- Identification: Pennant number: LST-839
- Honours and awards: 1 battle stars (World War II); 9 campaign stars, Presidential Unit Citation, Navy Unit Commendation, Navy Meritorious Unit Commendation (Vietnam)
- Fate: Loaned to Indonesia, 15 July 1970; Sold outright, February 1979

Indonesia
- Name: Teluk Bone
- Namesake: Gulf of Boni
- Acquired: 15 July 1970
- Decommissioned: 15 August 2019
- Identification: Pennant number: 511
- Status: Decommissioned, derelict.

General characteristics
- Class & type: LST-542-class tank landing ship; Teluk Langsa-class tank landing ship
- Displacement: 1,625 long tons (1,651 t) light; 4,080 long tons (4,145 t) full
- Length: 328 ft (100 m)
- Beam: 50 ft (15 m)
- Draft: Unloaded : 2 ft 4 in (0.71 m) forward; 7 ft 6 in (2.29 m) aft; Loaded : 8 ft 2 in (2.49 m) forward; 14 ft 1 in (4.29 m) aft
- Propulsion: 2 × General Motors 12-567 diesel engines, two shafts, twin rudders
- Speed: 12 knots (22 km/h; 14 mph)
- Boats & landing craft carried: 2 × LCVPs
- Troops: 16 officers, 147 enlisted men
- Complement: 7 officers, 104 enlisted men
- Armament: 8 × 40 mm guns; 12 × 20 mm guns

USS Iredell County (LST-839) was an LST-542-class tank landing ship built for the United States Navy during World War II. Named after Iredell County, North Carolina, she was the only U.S. Naval vessel to bear the name. She was acquired by the Indonesian Navy in 1970 as KRI Teluk Bone (511) and decommissioned in 2019. She is planned to be preserved as museum ship.

== Service history ==
Originally laid down as USS LST-839 by the American Bridge Company of Ambridge, Pennsylvania, on 25 September 1944; the ship was launched on 12 November 1944, sponsored by Mrs. Arthur Lehner; and commissioned at New Orleans, Louisiana, on 6 December 1944.

=== World War II, 1945–1946 ===
After shakedown off the coast of Florida, LST-839 loaded Army troops and cargo and departed New Orleans for the Pacific on 9 January 1945. Steaming via the Panama Canal, Pearl Harbor, and Eniwetok, she reached Saipan on 10 March. There she prepared to support the invasion of Okinawa; and, after embarking Seabees and loading construction equipment, she sailed on 12 April for that strategic island, which lay at the gateway to the heart of the Japanese Empire. The campaign was well underway when LST-839 reached Kinmu Wan, Okinawa on 17 April. Despite heavy enemy air raids, she debarked troops and discharged cargo, then returned to Saipan on 21 April to transport additional troops. During the four remaining months of the war, she shuttled troops and equipment among the Marianas, Philippine, and Okinawa staging areas for the possible invasion of Japan. The enemy's acceptance of Allied peace terms precluded an invasion, and the landing ship then operated between the Philippines and Japan, transporting occupation forces until mid-November.

Arriving at Guam on 12 November, LST-839 embarked 500 veterans of the Pacific fighting and sailed on 17 November for the United States. Steaming via Pearl Harbor, she reached San Francisco on 28 December. She sailed for Astoria, Oregon on 25 January 1946; decommissioned at Vancouver, Washington on 24 July; and entered the Pacific Reserve Fleet. While berthed in the Columbia River, she was named USS Iredell County (LST-892) on 1 July 1955.

=== Vietnam War, 1966–1970 ===
Iredell County recommissioned at San Diego, California on 18 June 1966. Completing training, Iredell County sailed to join the 7th Fleet on 3 September 1966. En route to Japan with her first cargo since 1945, she called at Pearl Harbor and her new homeport of Guam. Exchanging cargo at Iwakuni, Japan on 12 October, Iredell County departed for Da Nang, Vietnam, arriving on 21 October. She shuttled petroleum, building materials, rations, troops, and equipment between Da Nang and Chu Lai 65 miles to the south. She also shuttled cargo from Danang to Cửa Việt Base for most of 1967. In 1968, after an overhaul on Guam and refresher training in Yokosuka, Japan, she sailed for the Vietnam rivers. She carried ammunition and other cargo to the base at Binh Thuy (about 50 mi. from the sea on the Bassac River) and others farther upstream until March 1969 when she returned to Guam for a month. In April 1969, she once again returned to Da Nang, via Subic Bay in the Philippines, and continued shuttling materials to Cửa Việt Base, Tan My, and Chu Lai. In the summer of 1969 she took the first of President Nixon's 25,000 marines and their equipment from Vietnam to Okinawa. Iredell County transported more than 7,360 tons of cargo and made 12 landings.

=== Transfer to Indonesia ===
She continued to serve the Pacific Fleet and participate operations underway in Southeast Asia until July 1970 when she was decommissioned and transferred (loaned) under terms of the Security Assistance Program to Indonesia. Renamed KRI Teluk Bone, the ship was struck from the Naval Vessel Register and sold outright to Indonesia in February 1979 and still active in service with Indonesian Navy as of December 2018. The ship took part in landing operations during the Indonesian invasion of East Timor, such as during the Battle of Dili.

On 15 September 2012, Teluk Bone and another World War II-era LST KRI Teluk Ratai (509) (ex-USS Presque Isle (APB-44)) participated in the commemorative sail Morotai in order to commemorated the Allied landing operation in Morotai on 15 September 1944. Both ships participated in the original landing on 15 September 1944 as a part of the Allied expeditionary force. Teluk Bone together with another World War II-era LST, Teluk Ratai finally decommissioned from Indonesian Navy service at the Second Fleet HQ (Koarmada II), Surabaya on 15 August 2019. She was donated to Pariaman city, West Sumatra as a museum, however, due to adverse weather conditions was abandoned and left derelict on a beach at Pariaman city.

== Awards ==
LST-839 received one battle star for World War II service, and as Iredell County the Presidential Unit Citation, Navy Unit Commendation, Navy Meritorious Unit Commendation, and 9 campaign stars for the Vietnam War. It also received several other awards.

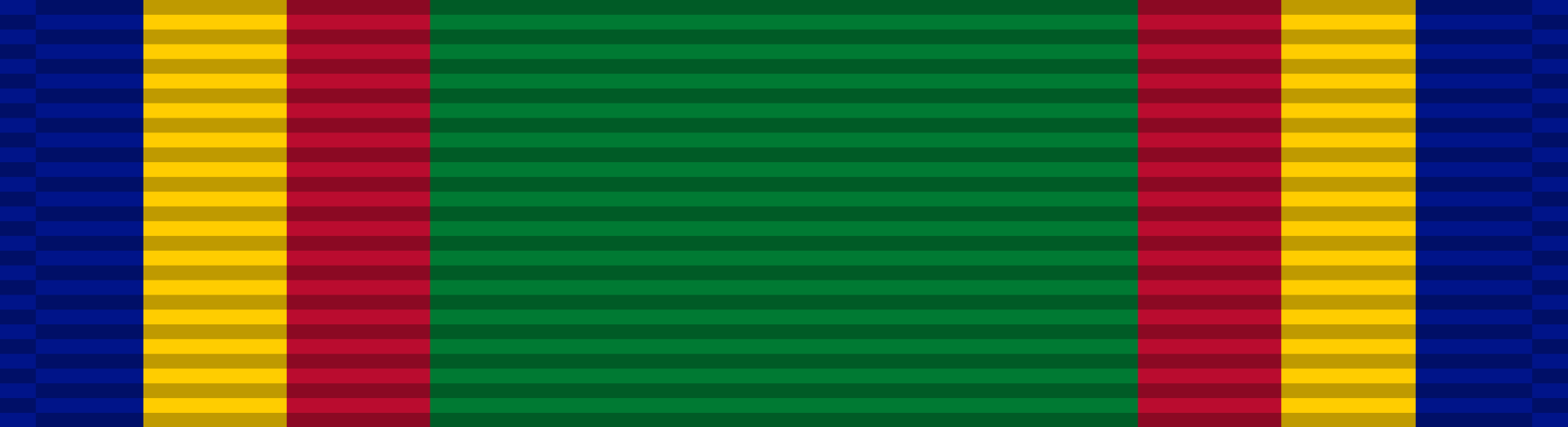

| Combat Action Ribbon with 2 stars | Presidential Unit Citation | Navy Unit Commendation |
| Navy Meritorious Unit Commendation | American Campaign Medal | Asiatic–Pacific Campaign Medal |
| World War II Victory Medal | Navy Occupation Service Medal with "ASIA" clasp | National Defense Service Medal |
| Vietnam Service Medal with 9 stars | Republic of Vietnam Gallantry Cross | Republic of Vietnam Campaign Medal |
