= USS LST-657 =

LST-542-class landing ship tank

History

United States
- Name: LST-657
- Builder: American Bridge Company, Ambridge
- Laid down: 16 December 1943
- Launched: 25 February 1944
- Sponsored by: Mrs R. B. Hunter
- Commissioned: 10 April 1944
- Decommissioned: 23 February 1946
- Recommissioned: 31 March 1852
- Decommissioned: 1 May 1961
- Renamed: T-LST-657
- Stricken: 1 May 1961
- Identification: Callsign: NKVP
- Fate: Transferred to Indonesia, 1961

Indonesia
- Name: Teluk Manado
- Namesake: Manado Bay
- Acquired: 1961
- Commissioned: 1961
- Decommissioned: 1983
- Home port: Tanjung Priok, Jakarta
- Identification: Pennant number: 505

General characteristics
- Class & type: LST-542-class tank landing ship; Teluk Langsa-class tank landing ship
- Displacement: 1,625 long tons (1,651 t) light; 4,080 long tons (4,145 t) full
- Length: 328 ft (100 m)
- Beam: 50 ft (15 m)
- Draft: Unloaded : 2 ft 4 in (0.71 m) forward; 7 ft 6 in (2.29 m) aft; Loaded : 8 ft 2 in (2.49 m) forward; 14 ft 1 in (4.29 m) aft
- Propulsion: 2 × General Motors 12-567 diesel engines, two shafts, twin rudders
- Speed: 12 knots (22 km/h; 14 mph)
- Boats & landing craft carried: 2 × LCVPs
- Troops: 16 officers, 147 enlisted men
- Complement: 7 officers, 104 enlisted men
- Sensors & processing systems: on KRI Teluk Manado; AN/SPS-21 surface search and navigation radar
- Armament: as USS LST-657; 8 × 40 mm guns; 12 × 20 mm guns; as KRI Teluk Manado; 8 × single 37 mm gun mounts

USS LST-657 was a LST-542-class tank landing ship in the United States Navy during World War II. She was transferred to the Indonesian Navy as KRI Teluk Manado (505).

== Construction and commissioning ==
LST-657 was laid down on 16 December 1943 at American Bridge Company, Ambridge, Pennsylvania. Launched on 25 February 1944 and commissioned on 10 April 1943.

=== Service in United States Navy ===
During World War II, LST-657 was assigned to the Asiatic-Pacific theater. She then participated in the occupation service in the Far East from 2 September 1945 until her decommissioning on 23 February 1946.

After being decommissioned, on the same day she was assigned to Commander Naval Forces Far East (COMNAVFE) Shipping Control Authority for Japan (SCAJAP), redesignated Q071.

Transferred to the Military Sea Transportation Service (MSTS), 31 March 1952 and placed in service as USNS T-LST-657.

Placed out of service and struck from the Naval Register, 1 May 1961.

Under provisions of the Military Assistance Program, she was transferred to the Indonesia in 1961, and served as Teluk Manado (505).

=== Service in Indonesian Navy ===
She was finally decommissioned in 1983.

== Awards ==
LST-657 have earned the following awards:

- China Service Medal (extended)
- American Campaign Medal
- Asiatic-Pacific Campaign Medal
- World War II Victory Medal
- Navy Occupation Service Medal (with Asia clasp)

== Sources ==
- United States. Dept. of the Treasury (1962). Treasury Decisions Under the Customs, Internal Revenue, Industrial Alcohol, Narcotic and Other Laws, Volume 97. U.S. Government Printing Office.
- Moore, Capt. John (1984). Jane's Fighting Ships 1984-85. Jane's Information Group. ISBN 978-0710607959.
- Saunders, Stephen (2009). Jane's Fighting Ships 2009-2010. Jane's Information Group. ISBN 978-0710628886.
- Fairplay International Shipping Journal Volume 222. United Kingdom: Fairplay Publishing Limited. 1967.
- Haryadi, Letkol. (Mar.) Yosafat Robert (2019). Sejarah Kavaleri Korps Marinir (in Indonesian). Surabaya: Penerbit Karunia. ISBN 978-979-9039-97-2.
