= USS Presque Isle =

American tank landing ship

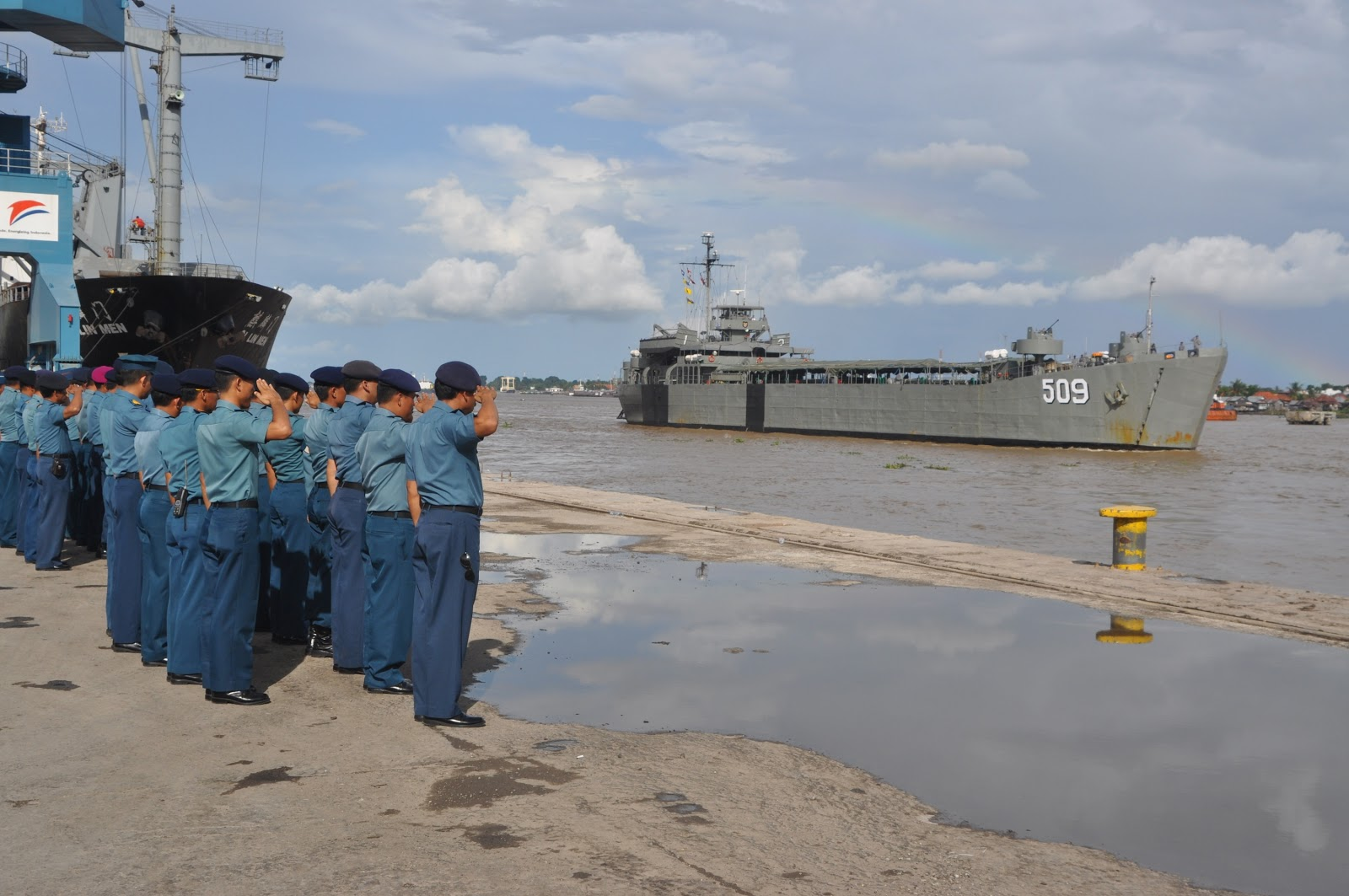
- KRI Teluk Ratai (509) at Palembang in 2013

History

United States
- Name: LST-678
- Renamed: Presque Isle, 31 March 1945
- Namesake: Presque Isle County, Michigan
- Builder: American Bridge Company, Ambridge, Pennsylvania
- Laid down: 29 April 1944
- Launched: 16 June 1944
- Commissioned: 30 June 1944
- Decommissioned: 18 April 1947
- Stricken: 1 May 1959
- Identification: Pennant number: APB-44; Callsign: NFLK; IMO number: 5159870
- Fate: Sold as civilian merchant ship

Indonesia
- Name: Teluk Ratai
- Namesake: Ratai Bay, part of Lampung Bay
- Acquired: 9 February 1967
- Decommissioned: 15 August 2019
- Renamed: Teluk Sindoro, 1980s; Teluk Ratai, 2000s
- Home port: Surabaya
- Identification: Pennant number: 509
- Status: Decommissioned, planned to be preserved as museum ship

General characteristics as LST-678
- Class & type: LST-542-class tank landing ship
- Displacement: 1,625 long tons (1,651 t) light; 4,080 long tons (4,145 t) full
- Length: 328 ft (100 m)
- Beam: 50 ft (15 m)
- Draft: Unloaded : 2 ft 4 in (0.71 m) forward; 7 ft 6 in (2.29 m) aft; Loaded : 8 ft 2 in (2.49 m) forward; 14 ft 1 in (4.29 m) aft
- Propulsion: 2 × General Motors 12-567 diesel engines, two shafts, twin rudders
- Speed: 12 knots (22 km/h; 14 mph)
- Boats & landing craft carried: 2 × LCVPs
- Troops: 16 officers, 147 enlisted men
- Complement: 7 officers, 104 enlisted men
- Sensors & processing systems: on KRI Teluk Ratai; AN/SPS-21 surface search and navigation radar
- Armament: as USS LST-678; 8 × 40 mm guns; 12 × 20 mm guns; as KRI Teluk Ratai; 8 × single 37 mm gun mounts

General characteristics as Presque Isle
- Class & type: Benewah-class barracks ship
- Displacement: 4,000 tons
- Length: 328 ft 0 in (99.97 m)
- Beam: 50 ft 0 in (15.24 m)
- Draft: 11 ft 2 in (3.40 m)
- Speed: 12 knots (22 km/h; 14 mph)
- Complement: 141; 1,226 troops
- Armament: 2 × 40 mm quad gun mounts; 2 × 0.5 in (12.7 mm) machine guns; 4 × .30 cal (7.62 mm) machine guns

USS LST-678 was an LST-542-class tank landing ship built for the United States Navy during World War II. Later she was converted to Benewah-class barracks ship as USS Presque Isle (APB-44), named after Presque Isle County, Michigan. She was acquired by Indonesian Navy in 1967 as KRI Teluk Ratai (509) and decommissioned in 2019. She is planned to be preserved as museum ship.

== Service history ==
USS LST-678 was laid down on 29 April 1944 by American Bridge Company, Ambridge, Pennsylvania. She was launched on 16 June 1944 and commissioned on 30 June 1944.

=== World War II ===
Following shakedown in the Gulf of Mexico, LST-678 proceeded via the Panama Canal and San Diego to Pearl Harbor, which she departed on 24 January 1945 to participate in the invasion of Iwo Jima. Renamed as USS Presque Isle (APB-44) on 31 March 1945, she provided logistic support for the Iwo Jima campaign from 22 February to 3 March. At Saipan, she prepared for the invasion of Okinawa. At Okinawa, she participated in a diversionary landing on the southern coast on 1 April 1945, and that day rescued 188 men from LST-884 which had been hit by a kamikaze. On the 2nd she was assigned tender, housing, and supply duties. Departing Okinawa on 8 July, she spent the remainder of the war at San Pedro and Subic Bays, Philippines.

=== Post-war service ===
After the end of the war, she was assigned for Occupation of Japan from 20 September 1945 to 14 February 1946. In July 1946, she participated in Operation Crossroads, nuclear weapon tests in Bikini Atoll. Presque Isle was assigned to Task Unit 1.8.3 of Task Group 1.8, which was part of Joint Task Force One. Her task unit were responsible for delivering dispatches and boat services. The Joint Task Force One itself was formed on 11 January 1946. It followed the basic principles of amphibious task forces used during the war, with the incorporation of the necessity of scientific program. The staff of joint task force consisted of Army, Navy, and civilian scientific personnel.

Presque Isle was decommissioned on 18 April 1947, she entered the Atlantic Reserve Fleet at Charleston Navy Yard. The ship was never reactivated and was stricken from the Naval Vessel Register on 1 May 1959.

She was sold for commercial service as Liberian-flagged MV Inagua Shipper. Along with MV Inagua Crest, Inagua Foam and Honduran-flagged MV Cal-Agro, Inagua Shipper were chartered by Military Sea Transportation Service in November 1962 to transport military cargo and passengers.

=== Indonesian Navy service ===
On 9 February 1967, MV Inagua Crest and MV Inagua Shipper were acquired by the Indonesian Navy and renamed as KRI Teluk Tomini (508) and KRI Teluk Ratai (509) respectively. As a former merchant ship, Teluk Ratai was rearmed with six, later increased to eight, Soviet 70-K 37 mm anti-aircraft guns in single mount. She was also equipped with AN/SPS-21 surface search and navigation radar.

In 1980s she was renamed as KRI Teluk Sindoro and in early 2000s she was renamed back to Teluk Ratai. The ship was transferred to Surabaya Military Sealift Unit of Military Sealift Command on 1 April 1990. Formerly she was assigned to Amphibious Ship Unit of Eastern Fleet Command.

While serving in the Indonesian Navy, Teluk Ratai was involved in various military operations, including transporting troops and its logistics to Indonesian outer islands, areas prone to disturbance, and to Indonesian borders with East Timor, Papua New Guinea, and Indonesian border with Malaysia, such as in Ambalat. She also took part in Navy's effort on national development through ABRI Masuk Desa program and Operation Bhakti Surya Bhaskara Jaya.

The ship transported logistics to areas affected by 2004 Indian Ocean earthquake and tsunami. On 8 February 2005, Teluk Ratai alongside KRI Teluk Langsa landed at beach in Calang, Aceh Jaya Regency. They were disembarking parts of three bailey bridges that will be used to connect road access from Banda Aceh and Meulaboh to the town that were cut off by the tsunami. On 22 February, she transported building materials, foods and drinking waters, water dispensers, tarpaulins, drums of gasolines, and various kinds of engine lubricants. The ship also carried various small arms from Teluk Bayur Naval Base, consisted of 50 M1 Garands, 13 SAFNs, 14 Owen guns, 3 Madsen M-50s, 1 Sten, 1 "Schmeiser", and 1 "Remington".

On 15 September 2012, Teluk Ratai alongside KRI Teluk Bone, another World War II veteran, participated in sailing pass as part of 2012 Sail Morotai. The sailing pass itself was held to commemorate the Battle of Morotai that began on 15 September 1944. The sailing pass also attended by other Indonesian and foreign warships.

Teluk Ratai landed on a beach south of Banyuwangi Naval Base on 17 March 2013 as part of a inter-service battalion-level exercise. She disembarked troops and vehicles of the 202nd Mechanized Infantry Battalion "Tajimalela". On 19 February 2016, the ship had gunnery exercise with her 37 mm guns in the waters off Gundul Island, part of Karimunjawa Islands.

On 15 August 2019, Teluk Ratai along with Teluk Bone were decommissioned in a ceremony held at 2nd Fleet Command HQ in Surabaya. The ceremony was presided over by Chief of Staff of Military Sealift Command. At the time of their decommissioning, they were the oldest warship in Indonesian Navy.

A meeting between Pariaman mayor and high-ranking officers of Navy Main Base II Padang was held on 7 June 2021. As the result of the meeting, Teluk Ratai was transferred to the Pariaman municipal government to be preserved as museum ship. She is planned to be moored at Central Pariaman District, either at Pauh Beach or behind Pauh Sports Center. As of 21 June, the Navy is processing the ship's administration, while the municipal government is discussing the resources needed to moored her and funds to tow the ship from her homeport at Surabaya to Pariaman. A meeting between Pariaman mayor and Commander of Navy Main Base II Padang was held again on 14 December, which discussed the development plan for the maritime museum that will includes Teluk Ratai.

Head of Pariaman City Public Works Department said on 4 January 2022 that the budget worth of 1.5 billion rupiah will be appropriated for works on the courtyard for Teluk Ratai berth at Pasir Pauh, Pariaman. The courtyard are 12 meters in width and 80 to 100 meters in length. The construction of the courtyard was planned to start in April 2022. In October 2022, the Mayor of Pariaman said that the municipal government can only provide 2 billion out of 10 billion rupiah in total to relocate the ship to Pariaman and has asked the central government for the funding.

== Awards ==
As USS Presque Isle, the ship earned the following awards:

American Campaign Medal
Asiatic–Pacific Campaign Medal	World War II Victory Medal	Navy Occupation Service Medal with Asia clasp
