= USS Clarke County =

Tank landing ship of the US Navy

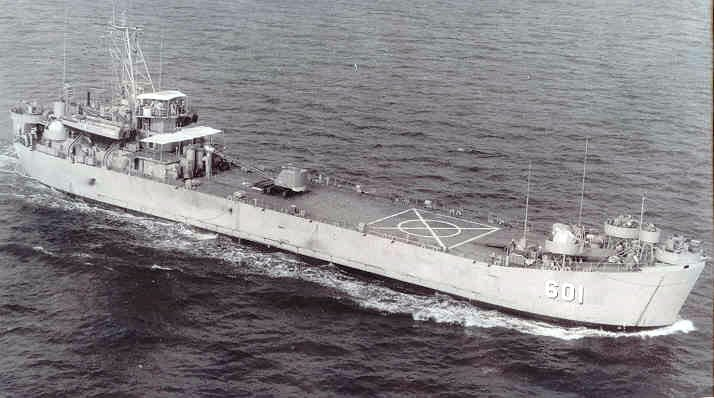
- USS Clarke County (LST-601), underway off the coast of South Vietnam, c. 1967.

History

United States
- Name: LST-601
- Builder: Chicago Bridge and Iron Company, Seneca
- Laid down: 21 October 1943
- Launched: 4 March 1944
- Sponsored by: Mrs. Celia Counter Finch
- Commissioned: 25 March 1944
- Renamed: USS Clarke County (LST-601), 1 July 1955
- Namesake: Clarke County, Alabama; Clarke County, Georgia; Clarke County, Iowa; Clarke County, Mississippi; Clarke County, Virginia
- Decommissioned: 23 November 1955
- Recommissioned: 28 July 1966
- Decommissioned: c. 1970
- Honors and awards: One battle star for World War II service; Six campaign stars and two Meritorious Unit Commendations for Vietnam War service
- Fate: Sold to Indonesian Navy, c. 1979

Indonesia
- Name: Teluk Saleh
- Namesake: Saleh Bay
- Acquired: c. 1979
- Identification: Pennant number: 510
- Status: placed in reserve, c. 1995–98

General characteristics
- Class & type: LST-542-class tank landing ship; Teluk Langsa-class tank landing ship
- Displacement: 1,780 tons standard, 3,640 tons full load
- Length: 328 ft (99.97 m)
- Beam: 50 ft (15.24 m)
- Draught: Bow 2'-4", stern 7'-6" (unloaded); bow 8'-2", stern 14'-1" (unloaded)
- Depth: 8' fwd; 14'-4" aft (full load)
- Propulsion: Two General Motors 12-567 diesel engines, two shafts, twin rudders
- Speed: 12 knots (22 km/h)
- Boats & landing craft carried: Two LCVPs
- Troops: 140 officers and enlisted men
- Complement: 8–10 officers, 100–115 enlisted men
- Armament: One single 3 in (76 mm)/50 gun mount, eight 40 mm guns, twelve 20 mm guns

USS Clarke County (LST-601), originally USS LST-601, was a United States Navy LST-542-class tank landing ship built during World War II and in commission from 1944 to 1955 and again in the late 1960s. Named after Clarke Counties in Alabama, Georgia, Iowa, Mississippi, and Virginia, she was the only U.S. Navy vessel to bear the name.

== Construction and commissioning ==
USS LST-601 was laid down on 21 October 1943 at Seneca, Illinois, by the Chicago Bridge and Iron Company. She was launched on 4 March 1944, sponsored by Mrs. Celia Counter Finch, and commissioned on 25 March 1944.

== First period in commission, 1944–1955 ==
During World War II, LST-601 was assigned to the European Theater of Operations and participated in Operation Dragoon, the invasion of southern France in August and September 1944. At the close of World War II, LST-601 remained in active service in Amphibious Force, United States Atlantic Fleet.

LST-601 was renamed USS Clarke County (LST-601) on 1 July 1955. She was decommissioned on 23 November 1955.

== Second period in commissiong, late 1960s ==
Clarke County was recommissioned on 28 July 1966 and performed service in the Vietnam War from 1967 to 1970. 21 November 1967 she struck a sunken landing craft while attempting to beach at Doc Pho, South Vietnam. The ship lost power and went aground parallel to the beach., and required the salvage efforts of fleet tugs USS Abnaki and USS Ute and rescue and salvage ship USS Bolster, USS Mars, USS Alamo. Clarke County was refloated on 1 December 1967.

== Awards and honors ==
LST-601 received one battle star for World War II service. Clarke County received six campaign stars plus two awards of the Meritorious Unit Commendation for Vietnam War service.

== Transfer to Indonesia ==
Clarke County was decommissioned and stricken from the Navy Directory after her Vietnam War service had ended. She was sold to Indonesia for service in the Indonesian Navy as KRI Teluk Saleh (510).

== Sources ==
- "LST-601 Clarke County". Amphibious Photo Archive.

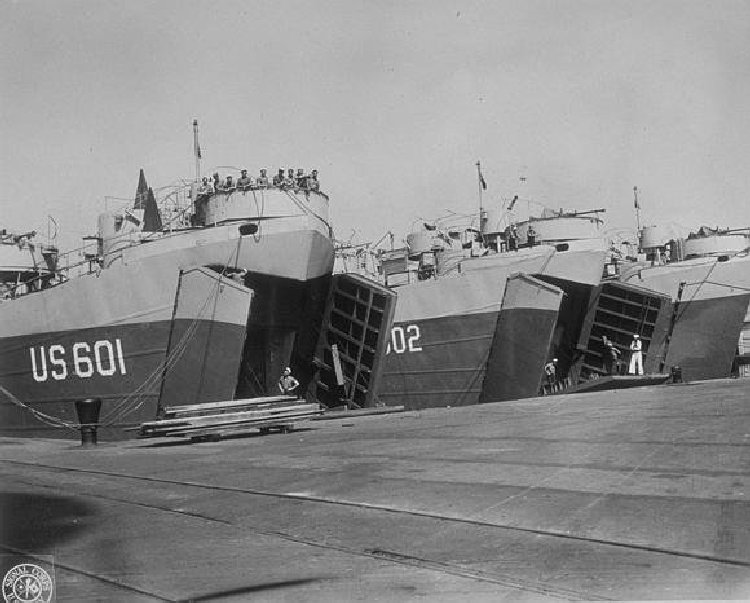
LST-601, LST-602, and LST-603, at the Naval Amphibious Base Little Creek, Virginia on 10 May 1944.
