= Soviet destroyer Bezuprechny (1937) =

Destroyer of the Soviet Navy

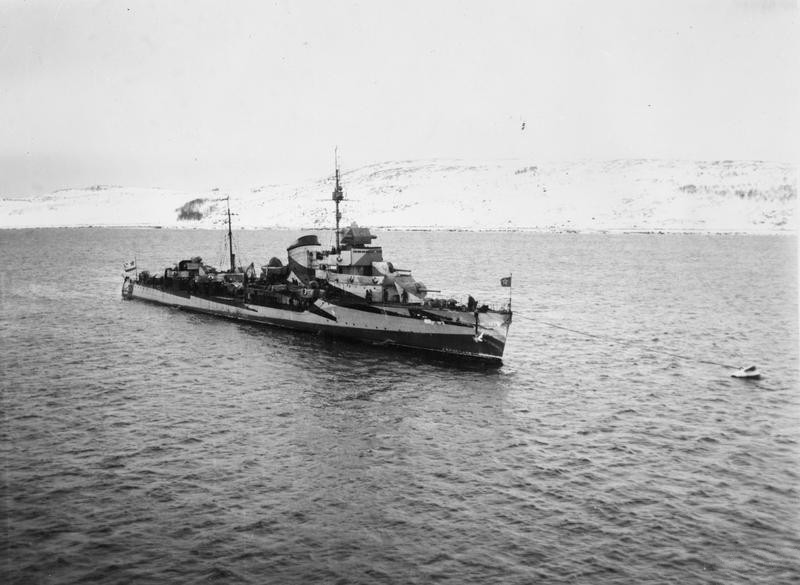
- Aerial view of sister ship Razumny, March 1944

History

Soviet Union
- Name: Bezuprechny
- Ordered: 2nd Five-Year Plan
- Builder: Shipyard No. 200 (named after 61 Communards), Nikolayev
- Laid down: 23 August 1936
- Launched: 25 June 1937
- Completed: 2 October 1939
- Fate: Sunk by aircraft, 26 June 1942

General characteristics (Gnevny as completed, 1938)
- Class & type: Gnevny-class destroyer
- Displacement: 1,612 t (1,587 long tons) (standard)
- Length: 112.8 m (370 ft 1 in) (o/a)
- Beam: 10.2 m (33 ft 6 in)
- Draft: 4.8 m (15 ft 9 in)
- Installed power: 3 water-tube boilers; 48,000 shp (36,000 kW)
- Propulsion: 2 shafts; 2 geared steam turbines
- Speed: 38 knots (70 km/h; 44 mph)
- Range: 2,720 nmi (5,040 km; 3,130 mi) at 19 knots (35 km/h; 22 mph)
- Complement: 197 (236 wartime)
- Sensors & processing systems: Mars hydrophone
- Armament: 4 × single 130 mm (5.1 in) guns; 2 × single 76.2 mm (3 in) AA guns; 2 × single 45 mm (1.8 in) AA guns; 2 × single 12.7 mm (0.50 in) AA machineguns; 2 × triple 533 mm (21 in) torpedo tubes; 60–96 mines; 2 × depth charge racks, 25 depth charges

Bezuprechny was one of 29 Gnevny-class destroyers (officially known as Project 7) built for the Soviet Navy during the late 1930s. Completed in 1939, she was assigned to the Black Sea Fleet. After the German invasion of the Soviet Union (Operation Barbarossa) in June 1941, the ship laid minefields and participated in the Siege of Odessa, ferrying men and supplies to the beleaguered city and providing naval gunfire support. Bezuprechny was damaged by German aircraft in September and was under repair for most of the rest of the year. During the Siege of Sevastopol, the ship resumed her duties in late December, only with a different destination. She was sunk by German aircraft while transporting supplies and troops on 26 June 1942 with the loss of approximately 300 crewmen and 320 passengers.

== Design and description ==
Having decided to build the large and expensive 40-knot (74 km/h; 46 mph) Leningrad-class destroyer leaders, the Soviet Navy sought Italian assistance in designing smaller and cheaper destroyers. They licensed the plans for the Folgore class and, in modifying it for their purposes, overloaded a design that was already somewhat marginally stable.

The Gnevnys had an overall length of 112.8 meters (370 ft 1 in), a beam of 10.2 meters (33 ft 6 in), and a draft of 4.8 meters (15 ft 9 in) at deep load. The ships were significantly overweight, almost 200 metric tons (197 long tons) heavier than designed, displacing 1,612 metric tons (1,587 long tons) at standard load and 2,039 metric tons (2,007 long tons) at deep load. Their crew numbered 197 officers and sailors in peacetime and 236 in wartime. The ships had a pair of geared steam turbines, each driving one propeller, rated to produce 48,000 shaft horsepower (36,000 kW) using steam from three water-tube boilers which was intended to give them a maximum speed of 37 knots (69 km/h; 43 mph). The designers had been conservative in rating the turbines and many, but not all, of the ships handily exceeded their designed speed during their sea trials. Others fell considerably short of it. Bezuprechny reached 38.7 knots (71.7 km/h; 44.5 mph) during her trials in 1939. Variations in fuel oil capacity meant that the range of the Gnevnys varied between 1,670 to 3,145 nautical miles (3,093 to 5,825 km; 1,922 to 3,619 mi) at 19 knots (35 km/h; 22 mph). Bezuprechny herself demonstrated a range of 3,145 nmi (5,825 km; 3,619 mi) at that speed.

As built, the Gnevny-class ships mounted four 130-millimeter (5.1 in) B-13 guns in two pairs of superfiring single mounts fore and aft of the superstructure. Anti-aircraft defense was provided by a pair of 76.2-millimeter (3 in) 34-K AA guns in single mounts and a pair of 45-millimeter (1.8 in) 21-K AA guns as well as two 12.7-millimeter (0.50 in) DK or DShK machine guns. They carried six 533 mm (21.0 in) torpedo tubes in two rotating triple mounts; each tube was provided with a reload. The ships could also carry a maximum of either 60 or 95 mines and 25 depth charges. They were fitted with a set of Mars hydrophones for anti-submarine work, although they were useless at speeds over 3 knots (5.6 km/h; 3.5 mph). The ships were equipped with two K-1 paravanes intended to destroy mines and a pair of depth-charge throwers.

== Construction and service ==
Built in Nikolayev's Shipyard No. 200 (named after 61 Communards) as yard number 1069, Bezuprechny was laid down on 23 August 1936, launched on 25 June 1937, and was completed on 2 October 1939. When the Germans invaded the Soviet Union on 22 June 1941, the ship was assigned to the 2nd Destroyer Division of the Black Sea Fleet. On 23–25 June Bezuprechny laid 291 defensive mines off Sevastopol. On 9 July, the 2nd Destroyer Division, including the destroyer leader Kharkov, Bezuprechny and her sister ships Bodry, Boyky and Besposhchadny made an unsuccessful attempt to interdict Axis shipping near Fidonisi. On 14–17 August, Bezuprechny escorted the incomplete ships being evacuated from the shipyards at Nikolayev. She bombarded Axis positions with 52 shells from her 130 mm guns on 19 August. The destroyer helped to escort transports ferrying the 157th Rifle Division to Odessa on 16–21 September. Bezuprechny landed a company of naval infantry at Grigorievka on 22 September. While providing fire support during the operation, the ship was attacked by Junkers Ju 87 Stuka dive bombers of StG 77. Although she was not hit, splinters from numerous near misses knocked out her power and Besposhchadny had to tow her to Odessa for emergency repairs. On 28 September the destroyer Shaumyan towed her to Sevastopol for temporary repairs.

Bezuprechny steamed under her own power to Poti, Georgia, on 3 November for further repairs which were completed by the end of the month. On 8 December she accidentally collided with the steamer SS Mestkom and the resulting hole in her hull required 10 days to repair. The ship began transporting men and supplies to Sevastopol on 23 December, in addition to fire support duties. Between 25 December and 2 January 1942, Bezuprechny fired 304 shells from her main guns and she continued these types of missions through March. The ship was refitted in May and, together with the light cruiser Molotov, bombarded Axis positions surrounding Sevastopol with 240 shells on 16 June. Bezuprechny was loaded with 320 soldiers of the 142nd Rifle Brigade, 20 tons of ammunition, 15 tons of food and 2 tons of aircraft equipment, bound for Sevastopol, when she was attacked and sunk by dive bombers from II./StG 77. Rescue efforts by the destroyer leader Tashkent were unsuccessful as she was driven off by more aerial attacks. Only 3 survivors were rescued the following day by the submarines M-112 and M-118; all of the soldiers and approximately 300 crewmen were lost.

== Sources ==
- Balakin, Sergey (2007). Легендарные "семёрки" Эсминцы "сталинской" серии [Legendary Sevens: Stalin's destroyer series] (in Russian). Moscow: Yauza/Eksmo. ISBN 978-5-699-23784-5.
- Berezhnoy, Sergey (2002). Крейсера и миноносцы. Справочник [Guide to Cruisers and Destroyers] (in Russian). Moscow: Voenizdat. ISBN 5-203-01780-8.
- Bergström, Christer & Mikhailov, Andrey (2001). Black Cross/Red Star: The Air War Over the Eastern Front. Vol. 2: Resurgence, January – June 1942. Pacifica, California: Pacifica Military History. ISBN 0-935553-51-7.
- Budzbon, Przemysaw (1980). "Soviet Union". In Chesneau, Roger (ed.). Conway's All the World's Fighting Ships 1922–1946. Greenwich, UK: Conway Maritime Press. pp. 318–346. ISBN 0-85177-146-7.
- Hill, Alexander (2018). Soviet Destroyers of World War II. New Vanguard. Vol. 256. Oxford, UK: Osprey Publishing. ISBN 978-1-4728-2256-7.
- Platonov, Andrej V. (2002). Энциклопедия советских надводных кораблей 1941–1945 [Encyclopedia of Soviet Surface Ships 1941–1945] (in Russian). Saint Petersburg: Poligon. ISBN 5-89173-178-9.
- Rohwer, Jürgen (2005). Chronology of the War at Sea 1939–1945: The Naval History of World War Two (Third Revised ed.). Annapolis, Maryland: Naval Institute Press. ISBN 1-59114-119-2.
- Rohwer, Jürgen & Monakov, Mikhail S. (2001). Stalin's Ocean-Going Fleet. London: Frank Cass. ISBN 0-7146-4895-7.
- Yakubov, Vladimir & Worth, Richard (2008). "The Soviet Project 7/7U Destroyers". In Jordan, John & Dent, Stephen (eds.). Warship 2008. London: Conway. pp. 99–114. ISBN 978-1-84486-062-3.
