= Soviet destroyer Bodry =

Destroyer of the Soviet Navy

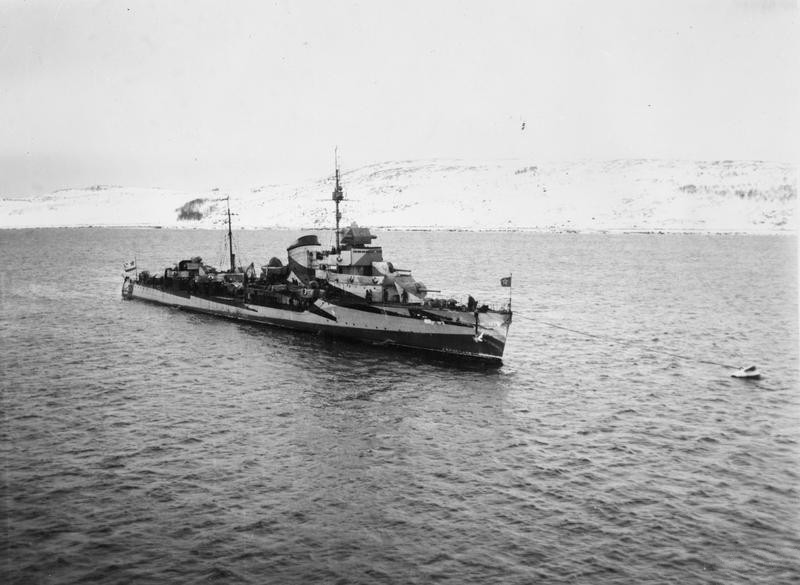
- Aerial view of sister ship Razumny, March 1944

History

Soviet Union
- Name: Bodry (Бодрый (Sprightly))
- Ordered: 2nd Five-Year Plan
- Builder: Shipyard No. 198 (Andre Marti (South)), Nikolayev
- Laid down: 31 December 1935
- Launched: 1 August 1936
- Completed: 6 November 1938
- Commissioned: 1 March 1939
- Renamed: TsL-3, 17 February 1956; UTS-8, 13 October 1959
- Reclassified: As a target ship, 17 February 1956; As a training ship, 13 October 1959
- Fate: Scrapped, early 1960s

General characteristics (Gnevny as completed, 1938)
- Class & type: Gnevny-class destroyer
- Displacement: 1,612 t (1,587 long tons) (standard)
- Length: 112.8 m (370 ft 1 in) (o/a)
- Beam: 10.2 m (33 ft 6 in)
- Draft: 4.8 m (15 ft 9 in)
- Installed power: 3 water-tube boilers; 48,000 shp (36,000 kW)
- Propulsion: 2 shafts; 2 geared steam turbines
- Speed: 38 knots (70 km/h; 44 mph)
- Range: 2,720 nmi (5,040 km; 3,130 mi) at 19 knots (35 km/h; 22 mph)
- Complement: 197 (236 wartime)
- Sensors & processing systems: Mars hydrophone
- Armament: 4 × single 130 mm (5.1 in) guns; 2 × single 76.2 mm (3 in) AA guns; 2 × single 45 mm (1.8 in) AA guns; 2 × single 12.7 mm (0.50 in) AA machineguns; 2 × triple 533 mm (21 in) torpedo tubes; 60–96 mines; 2 × depth charge racks, 25 depth charges

Bodry (Russian: Бодрый, lit. 'Sprightly') was one of 29 Gnevny-class destroyers (officially known as Project 7) built for the Soviet Navy during the late 1930s. Completed in 1938, she was assigned to the Black Sea Fleet. After the German invasion of the Soviet Union (Operation Barbarossa) in June 1941, the ship covered the evacuation of the Danube Flotilla to Odessa the following month. During the Siege of Odessa, Bodry transported troops and supplies while providing naval gunfire support to the defenders and then helped to evacuate them in October. During the Siege of Sevastopol, she performed the same sorts of missions and then participated in the Battle of the Kerch Peninsula at the end of 1941. The ship bombarded German troops in January 1942 before beginning repairs the following month. Bodry was badly damaged during a German air raid in July and was under repair until the end of 1944.

The ship was modernized after the war before she became a target ship in 1956 and then a training ship in 1959. She was scrapped sometime during the early 1960s.

== Design and description ==
Having decided to build the large and expensive 40-knot (74 km/h; 46 mph) Leningrad-class destroyer leaders, the Soviet Navy sought Italian assistance in designing smaller and cheaper destroyers. They licensed the plans for the Folgore class and, in modifying it for their purposes, overloaded a design that was already somewhat marginally stable.

The Gnevnys had an overall length of 112.8 meters (370 ft 1 in), a beam of 10.2 meters (33 ft 6 in), and a draft of 4.8 meters (15 ft 9 in) at deep load. The ships were significantly overweight, almost 200 metric tons (197 long tons) heavier than designed, displacing 1,612 metric tons (1,587 long tons) at standard load and 2,039 metric tons (2,007 long tons) at deep load. Their crew numbered 197 officers and sailors in peacetime and 236 in wartime. The ships had a pair of geared steam turbines, each driving one propeller, rated to produce 48,000 shaft horsepower (36,000 kW) using steam from three water-tube boilers which was intended to give them a maximum speed of 37 knots (69 km/h; 43 mph). The designers had been conservative in rating the turbines and many, but not all, of the ships handily exceeded their designed speed during their sea trials. Others fell considerably short of it. Bodry reached 39.1 knots (72.4 km/h; 45.0 mph) during her trials in 1938. Variations in fuel oil capacity meant that the range of the Gnevnys varied between 1,670 to 3,145 nautical miles (3,093 to 5,825 km; 1,922 to 3,619 mi) at 19 knots (35 km/h; 22 mph). Bodry herself demonstrated a range of 2,190 nmi (4,060 km; 2,520 mi) at that speed.

As built, the Gnevny-class ships mounted four 130-millimeter (5.1 in) B-13 guns in two pairs of superfiring single mounts fore and aft of the superstructure. Anti-aircraft defense was provided by a pair of 76.2-millimeter (3 in) 34-K AA guns in single mounts and a pair of 45-millimeter (1.8 in) 21-K AA guns as well as two 12.7-millimeter (0.50 in) DK or DShK machine guns. They carried six 533 mm (21.0 in) torpedo tubes in two rotating triple mounts; each tube was provided with a reload. The ships could also carry a maximum of either 60 or 95 mines and 25 depth charges. They were fitted with a set of Mars hydrophones for anti-submarine work, although they were useless at speeds over 3 knots (5.6 km/h; 3.5 mph). The ships were equipped with two K-1 paravanes intended to destroy mines and a pair of depth-charge throwers.

=== Modifications ===
Her first model B-13 guns were replaced by those of the second model in April 1941. When her repairs were completed in 1944, Bodry's anti-aircraft armament consisted of two 34-K mounts, five 37-millimeter (1.5 in) 70-K AA guns in single mounts, two twin-gun mounts for Lend-Lease, water-cooled 12.7 mm Colt-Browning machine guns and two single mounts for DShK machine guns. By the end of the war, she had received a British ASDIC system, a Type 291 search radar and a Type 284 fire-control radar. After the war, all of her AA guns were replaced by eight water-cooled V-11M versions of the 70-K gun in twin mounts.

== Construction and service ==
Built in Nikolayev's Shipyard No. 198 (Andre Marti (South) as yard number 314, Bodry was laid down on 31 December 1935 and launched on 1 August 1936, the first of her class built at the shipyard. The ship was accepted on 6 November 1938 and joined the Black Sea Fleet on 1 March 1939. She spent much of the next year under repair, refitting from June 1939 to April 1940 at Shipyard No. 198 and again in August–October at Shipyard No. 201 in Sevastopol. The destroyer visited the Romanian port of Constanța in June 1940. When the Germans invaded the Soviet Union on 22 June 1941, the ship was assigned to the 2nd Destroyer Division of the Black Sea Fleet with her sisters built for the Black Sea Fleet and the destroyer leader Tashkent. On that day, she was in Sevastopol having her boilers cleaned. On 9 July, the 2nd Destroyer Division, including the destroyer leader Kharkov, Bodry and her sister ships Besposhchadny, Boyky and Bezuprechny, made an unsuccessful attempt to interdict Axis shipping near Fidonisi. On 19–20 July, the light cruiser Komintern, Kharkov, Bodry and the destroyers Smyshleny and Shaumyan and numerous smaller craft, covered the retreat of the Danube Flotilla to Odessa. While bombarding Axis positions on 19, 26–27 August and 9–13 September, she was lightly damaged by an Axis shell on 9 September. The ship also ferried supplies to Odessa and escorted the transports conveying the 157th Rifle Division from Novorossiysk to Odessa on 16–21 September. Two weeks later, Bodry helped to escort the ships evacuating the division from Odessa to Sevastopol on 3–6 October. In preparation for the evacuation of Odessa, she laid 48 mines on 14 October, bombarded Axis troops the following day and helped to evacuate the city's defenders on the 16th.

While providing naval gunfire support to Soviet troops on 31 October, Bodry was attacked by Junkers Ju 87 "Stuka" dive bombers from StG 77. While not directly hit, near misses peppered her with fragments, killing 4 crewmen and wounding 49. The ship was sent to Poti, Georgia, for repairs on 3 November which were completed on the 17th. Bodry helped to transport the 388th Rifle Division from Novorossiysk to Sevastopol on 7–13 December. On 21 December, she ferried 340 soldiers, six anti-tank guns and 35 t (34.4 long tons) of ammunition to Sevastopol. After her arrival, the ship bombarded German troops near the city with 298 shells from her main guns on 21–22 December. On 29–30 December, Bodry escorted reinforcements during the Battle of the Kerch Peninsula.

On 12 January 1942, the destroyer escorted the battleship Parizhskaya Kommuna as she bombarded targets near Stary Krym while contributing 86 shells of her own. She expended 88 main-gun shells on targets near Feodosia on 21 January. The ship received a brief refit at Tuapse from 28 January to 2 February. The ship was under repair at Poti from February until she was badly damaged by German bombers on 16 July. Bodry was struck by three bombs that blew the aft torpedo tube mount and rangefinder over the side and cracked her keel. Badly flooded, she was dry docked for repairs, but her stern broke off when the water was pumped out. The ship was under repair until 31 December 1944. During the war she fired a total of 1,332 shells from her main guns and laid 50 mines.

Bodry had her Lend-Lease electronics replaced by Soviet systems after the war and was modernized from 1951 to 31 December 1953. She was reclassified as a target ship on 17 February 1956 and renamed TsL-3. The ship then became a stationary training ship on 13 October 1959 and was renamed UTS-8; she was scrapped sometime in the 1960s.

== Sources ==
- Balakin, Sergey (2007). Легендарные "Семёрки". Эсминцы "сталинской" серии [Legendary Sevens. Stalin's destroyer series] (PDF) (in Russian). Moscow: Yauza/Eksmo. ISBN 978-5-699-23784-5.
- Berezhnoy, Sergey (2002). Крейсера и миноносцы. Справочник [Guide to Cruisers and Destroyers] (in Russian). Moscow: Voenizdat. ISBN 5-203-01780-8.
- Budzbon, Przemysaw (1980). "Soviet Union". In Chesneau, Roger (ed.). Conway's All the World's Fighting Ships 1922–1946. Greenwich, UK: Conway Maritime Press. pp. 318–346. ISBN 0-85177-146-7.
- Hill, Alexander (2018). Soviet Destroyers of World War II. New Vanguard. Vol. 256. Oxford, UK: Osprey Publishing. ISBN 978-1-4728-2256-7.
- Platonov, Andrey V. (2002). Энциклопедия советских надводных кораблей 1941–1945 [Encyclopedia of Soviet Surface Ships 1941–1945] (in Russian). Saint Petersburg: Poligon. ISBN 5-89173-178-9.
- Rohwer, Jürgen (2005). Chronology of the War at Sea 1939–1945: The Naval History of World War Two (3rd revised ed.). Annapolis, Maryland: Naval Institute Press. ISBN 1-59114-119-2.
- Rohwer, Jürgen & Monakov, Mikhail S. (2001). Stalin's Ocean-Going Fleet. London: Frank Cass. ISBN 0-7146-4895-7.
- Yakubov, Vladimir & Worth, Richard (2008). "The Soviet Project 7/7U Destroyers". In Jordan, John & Dent, Stephen (eds.). Warship 2008. London: Conway. pp. 99–114. ISBN 978-1-84486-062-3.
