= Soviet destroyer Boyky (1936) =

Destroyer of the Soviet Navy

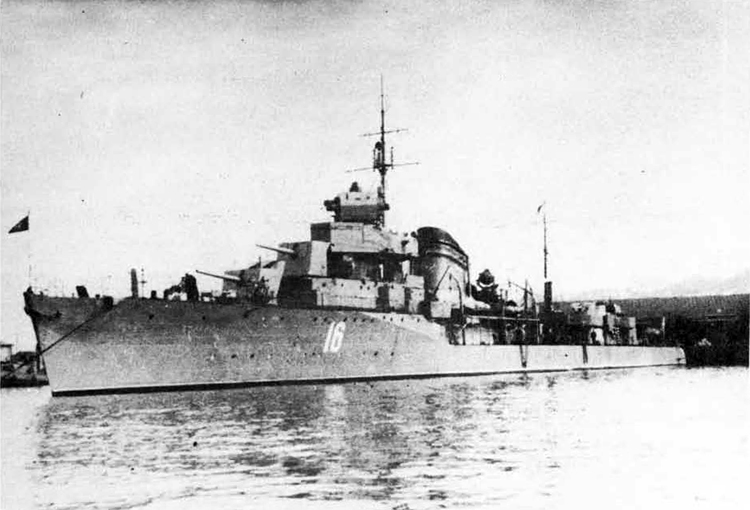
- Boyky in port

History

Soviet Union
- Name: Boyky (Бойкий (Active))
- Ordered: 2nd Five-Year Plan
- Builder: Shipyard No. 198 (Andre Marti (South)), Nikolayev
- Laid down: 17 April 1936
- Launched: 29 October 1936
- Completed: 9 March 1939
- Commissioned: 17 May 1939
- Renamed: OS-18, 17 February 1956
- Reclassified: As a target ship, 17 February 1956
- Stricken: 17 February 1956
- Honors and awards: Order of the Red Banner, 27 February 1943
- Fate: Sunk as a target, 9 February 1962

General characteristics (Gnevny as completed, 1938)
- Class & type: Gnevny-class destroyer
- Displacement: 1,612 t (1,587 long tons) (standard)
- Length: 112.8 m (370 ft 1 in) (o/a)
- Beam: 10.2 m (33 ft 6 in)
- Draft: 4.8 m (15 ft 9 in)
- Installed power: 3 water-tube boilers; 48,000 shp (36,000 kW)
- Propulsion: 2 shafts; 2 geared steam turbines
- Speed: 38 knots (70 km/h; 44 mph)
- Range: 2,720 nmi (5,040 km; 3,130 mi) at 19 knots (35 km/h; 22 mph)
- Complement: 197 (236 wartime)
- Sensors & processing systems: Mars hydrophone
- Armament: 4 × single 130 mm (5.1 in) guns; 2 × single 76.2 mm (3 in) AA guns; 2 × single 45 mm (1.8 in) AA guns; 2 × single 12.7 mm (0.50 in) AA machineguns; 2 × triple 533 mm (21 in) torpedo tubes; 60–96 mines; 2 × depth charge racks, 25 depth charges

Boyky (Russian: Бойкий, lit. 'Active') was one of 29 Gnevny-class destroyers (officially known as Project 7) built for the Soviet Navy during the late 1930s. Completed in 1939, she was assigned to the Black Sea Fleet. After the start of the German invasion of the Soviet Union (Operation Barbarossa) in June 1941, the ship helped to lay minefields off Sevastopol. During the Siege of Odessa, Boyky transported troops and supplies while providing naval gunfire support to the defenders and then helped to evacuate them in October. During the Siege of Sevastopol, she performed the same sorts of missions and then participated in the Battle of the Kerch Peninsula at the end of 1941.

After the conquest of Sevastopol in July 1942, Boyky continued to provide fire support for Soviet troops and transported them to Tuapse and other ports threatened by the German advance southeast along the Black Sea coast. The ship provided a diversion during the landings near Novorossiysk in early 1943. After German aircraft sank three destroyers in October, Stalin forbade the use of large ships without his express permission and Boyky's wartime service was finished. After the war, she had a lengthy modernization and then became a test ship in 1956; the ship was sunk in 1962.

== Design and description ==
Having decided to build the large and expensive 40-knot (74 km/h; 46 mph) Leningrad-class destroyer leaders, the Soviet Navy sought Italian assistance in designing smaller and cheaper destroyers. They licensed the plans for the Folgore class and, in modifying it for their purposes, overloaded a design that was already somewhat marginally stable.

The Gnevnys had an overall length of 112.8 meters (370 ft 1 in), a beam of 10.2 meters (33 ft 6 in), and a draft of 4.8 meters (15 ft 9 in) at deep load. The ships were significantly overweight, almost 200 metric tons (197 long tons) heavier than designed, displacing 1,612 metric tons (1,587 long tons) at standard load and 2,039 metric tons (2,007 long tons) at deep load. Their crew numbered 197 officers and sailors in peacetime and 236 in wartime. The ships had a pair of geared steam turbines, each driving one propeller, rated to produce 48,000 shaft horsepower (36,000 kW) using steam from three water-tube boilers which was intended to give them a maximum speed of 37 knots (69 km/h; 43 mph). The designers had been conservative in rating the turbines and many, but not all, of the ships handily exceeded their designed speed during their sea trials. Others fell considerably short of it. Boyky reached 34 knots (63 km/h; 39 mph) during trials in 1944. Variations in fuel oil capacity meant that the range of the Gnevnys varied between 1,670 to 3,145 nautical miles (3,093 to 5,825 km; 1,922 to 3,619 mi) at 19 knots (35 km/h; 22 mph). Boyky herself demonstrated a range of 1,350 nmi (2,500 km; 1,550 mi) at 16 knots (30 km/h; 18 mph).

As built, the Gnevny-class ships mounted four 130-millimeter (5.1 in) B-13 guns in two pairs of superfiring single mounts fore and aft of the superstructure. Anti-aircraft defense was provided by a pair of 76.2-millimeter (3 in) 34-K AA guns in single mounts and a pair of 45-millimeter (1.8 in) 21-K AA guns as well as two 12.7-millimeter (0.50 in) DK or DShK machine guns. They carried six 533 mm (21.0 in) torpedo tubes in two rotating triple mounts; each tube was provided with a reload. The ships could also carry a maximum of either 60 or 95 mines and 25 depth charges. They were fitted with a set of Mars hydrophones for anti-submarine work, although they were useless at speeds over 3 knots (5.6 km/h; 3.5 mph). The ships were equipped with two K-1 paravanes intended to destroy mines and a pair of depth-charge throwers.

=== Modifications ===
By the end of the war, Boyky's anti-aircraft armament consisted of two 34-K mounts, five 37-millimeter (1.5 in) 70-K AA guns in single mounts, two twin-gun mounts for Lend-Lease, water-cooled 12.7 mm Colt-Browning machine guns and two single mounts for DShK machine guns. She had received a British ASDIC system and a Type 286 search radar. After the war, all of her AA guns were replaced by eight water-cooled V-11M versions of the 70-K gun in twin mounts and her electronics were replaced by Soviet systems.

== Construction and service ==
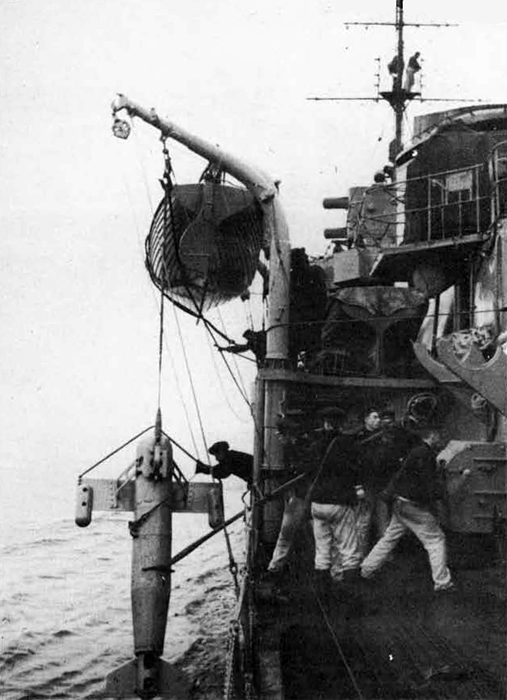
Streaming a paravane aboard Boyky

Built in Nikolayev's Shipyard No. 198 (Andre Marti (South)) as yard number 321, Boyky was laid down on 17 April 1936. The ship was completed on 9 March 1939 and was commissioned into the Black Sea Fleet on 17 May. When the Germans invaded the Soviet Union on 22 June 1941, the ship was assigned to the 2nd Destroyer Division. On 23–24 June Boyky laid defensive mines off Sevastopol. On 9 July, the 2nd Destroyer Division, including the destroyer leader Kharkov, Boyky and her sister ships Bodry, Bezuprechny and Besposhchadny made an unsuccessful attempt to interdict Axis shipping near Fidonisi. On 14–17 August, Boyky escorted the incomplete ships being evacuated from the shipyards at Nikolayev. Together with the light cruisers Chervona Ukraina and Komintern and the destroyers Nezamozhnik and Shaumyan, Boyky and Besposhchadny bombarded Axis positions west of Odessa on 1–2 September. That month, Boyky began ferrying troops and supplies to encircled Odessa as well as providing naval gunfire support. On 7 September, Boyky and the destroyer Sposobny escorted the Commander of the Black Sea Fleet, Vice Admiral Filipp Oktyabrsky, aboard the destroyer leader Kharkov to Odessa. While they were present, all three ships bombarded Romanian troops. On 16–21 September the destroyer helped to escort transports ferrying the 157th Rifle Division to Odessa. She landed a company of naval infantry behind Romanian lines at Grigorievka on 21 September and provided fire support for them the following day.

Boyky helped to escort the ships evacuating the 157th Rifle Division from Odessa to Sevastopol on 3–6 October. She escorted the damaged submarine Shch-212 to Sevastopol on 27 October. The ship was assigned to the fire support group defending Sevastopol on 31 October and then helped to evacuate cut-off Soviet troops from pockets along the Black Sea coast to Sevastopol in early November. When not bombarding Axis positions, Boyky ferried reinforcements and supplies to Sevastopol. The ship was refitted in Poti, Georgia, from 17 November to 1 December. On 29–30 December, she escorted reinforcements during the Battle of the Kerch Peninsula. During 1941, Boyky fired a total of 1,227 main-gun shells, laid 106 mines and transported 4,883 troops.

Together with the destroyer Soobrazitelny, she escorted a pair of merchantmen to the Bosporus on 3–5 January 1942. The following night, the destroyer escorted the battleship Parizhskaya Kommuna as she bombarded targets near Stary Krym while contributing shells of her own. During the night of 6/7 January, Boyky landed 450 men west of Feodosia. While escorting the transport SS Serov from Novorossiysk to Poti, the ship collided with the merchantman and was forced to return to port. She was repaired at Tuapse from 16 January to 11 February, although she was further damaged by a storm on 22 January. Boyky resumed ferrying supplies to Sevastopol and often bombarded Axis troops in the Crimea. Partial records of her main-gun ammunition expenditures have survived: 134 rounds on 22 and 26 February and 118 rounds on 5, 14, 15 and 26 April. Her last supply mission to Sevastopol was on 23 May before the ship spent the next several months under repair.

Soobrazitelny and Boyky bombarded the port of Yalta with 97 shells on the night of 2/3 October. The destroyer helped to ferry troops to reinforce the defenders of Tuapse on 24–28 October. A month later, Besposhchadny and Boyky were tasked to attack Axis shipping off the Bulgarian coast and to bombard the port of Mangalia, Romania. They failed to locate any ships and mistook coastal rocks for a convoy in heavy fog on 1 December, firing 141 shells from their main guns and six torpedoes at them. On the night of 20/21 December Kharkov and Boyky bombarded Yalta with 168 shells; on their way home they encountered German motor torpedo boats, but neither side was damaged in a desultory action. In preparation for amphibious landings west of Novorossiysk on the night of 3/4 February 1943, Boyky, Besposhchadny and Soobrazitelny and the cruiser Voroshilov bombarded German positions during the night of 30/31 January; during the actual landings, Boyky bombarded Anapa as a diversion. The ship was awarded the Order of the Red Banner on 27 February. On the night of 30 April/1 May, Boyky and Besposhchadny shelled Axis positions on the Kerch Peninsula. Two weeks later, Kharkov and Boyky fired 235 shells between them from their 130 mm guns at Anapa harbor. Boyky, Besposhchadny and Sposobny made an unsuccessful attempt on 30 September to intercept German transports evacuating troops and equipment from the Kuban Bridgehead. The loss of Kharkov, Sponsoby and Besposhchadny to German dive bombers on 6 October prompted an infuriated Stalin to issue an order forbidding the use of ships destroyer-sized and larger without his express permission and Boyky saw no further action during the war.

The ship was modernized from 1948 to 27 December 1951; Boyky was stricken from the Navy List on 17 February 1956 and redesignated as test ship OS-18. She was sunk in shallow water on Tendra Spit on 9 February 1962.

== Sources ==
- Balakin, Sergey (2007). Легендарные "семёрки" Эсминцы "сталинской" серии [Legendary Sevens: Stalin's destroyer series] (in Russian). Moscow: Yauza/Eksmo. ISBN 978-5-699-23784-5.
- Berezhnoy, Sergey (2002). Крейсера и миноносцы. Справочник [Guide to Cruisers and Destroyers] (in Russian). Moscow: Voenizdat. ISBN 5-203-01780-8.
- Budzbon, Przemysaw (1980). "Soviet Union". In Chesneau, Roger (ed.). Conway's All the World's Fighting Ships 1922–1946. Greenwich, UK: Conway Maritime Press. pp. 318–346. ISBN 0-85177-146-7.
- Hill, Alexander (2018). Soviet Destroyers of World War II. New Vanguard. Vol. 256. Oxford, UK: Osprey Publishing. ISBN 978-1-4728-2256-7.
- Platonov, Andrey V. (2002). Энциклопедия советских надводных кораблей 1941–1945 [Encyclopedia of Soviet Surface Ships 1941–1945] (in Russian). Saint Petersburg: Poligon. ISBN 5-89173-178-9.
- Rohwer, Jürgen (2005). Chronology of the War at Sea 1939–1945: The Naval History of World War Two (Third Revised ed.). Annapolis, Maryland: Naval Institute Press. ISBN 1-59114-119-2.
- Rohwer, Jürgen & Monakov, Mikhail S. (2001). Stalin's Ocean-Going Fleet. London: Frank Cass. ISBN 0-7146-4895-7.
- Yakubov, Vladimir & Worth, Richard (2008). "The Soviet Project 7/7U Destroyers". In Jordan, John & Dent, Stephen (eds.). Warship 2008. London: Conway. pp. 99–114. ISBN 978-1-84486-062-3.
