= Soviet destroyer Smyshlyony (1940) =

Soviet destroyer

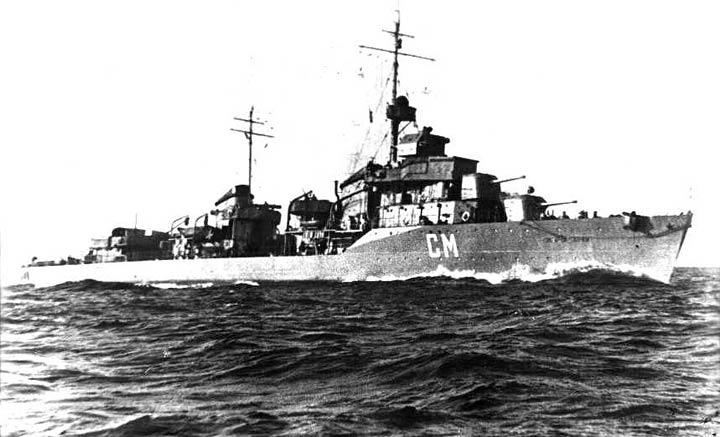
- Smyshlyony underway

History

Soviet Union
- Name: Smyshlyony (Смышлёный (Clever))
- Ordered: 2nd Five-Year Plan
- Builder: Shipyard No. 200 (named after 61 Communards), Nikolayev
- Yard number: 1077
- Laid down: 27 June 1938
- Launched: 26 August 1939
- Commissioned: 11 November 1940
- Fate: Sunk by mine, 7 March 1942

General characteristics (Storozhevoy, 1941)
- Class & type: Storozhevoy-class destroyer
- Displacement: 1,727 t (1,700 long tons) (standard); 2,279 t (2,243 long tons) (full load)
- Length: 112.5 m (369 ft 1 in) (o/a)
- Beam: 10.2 m (33 ft 6 in)
- Draft: 3.98 m (13 ft 1 in)
- Installed power: 4 water-tube boilers; 54,000 shp (40,000 kW) (trials)
- Propulsion: 2 shafts, 2 steam turbine sets
- Speed: 40.3 knots (74.6 km/h; 46.4 mph) (trials)
- Endurance: 2,700 nmi (5,000 km; 3,100 mi) at 19 knots (35 km/h; 22 mph)
- Complement: 207 (271 wartime)
- Sensors & processing systems: Mars hydrophones
- Armament: 4 × single 130 mm (5.1 in) guns; 2 × single 76.2 mm (3 in) AA guns; 3 × single 45 mm (1.8 in) AA guns; 4 × single 12.7 mm (0.50 in) DK or DShK machine guns; 2 × triple 533 mm (21 in) torpedo tubes; 58–96 mines; 30 depth charges

Smyshlyony (Russian: Смышлёный, lit. 'Clever') was one of 18 Storozhevoy-class destroyer (officially known as Project 7U) built for the Soviet Navy during the late 1930s. Although she began construction as a Project 7 Gnevny-class destroyer, Smyshlyony was completed in 1940 to the modified Project 7U design.

Assigned to the Black Sea Fleet, she covered the evacuation of the Danube Flotilla to Odessa a few weeks after the German invasion of the Soviet Union on 22 June. During the Sieges of Odessa and Sevastopol in 1941–1942, the ship ferried reinforcements and supplies into those cities, evacuated wounded and refugees and bombarded Axis troop positions. Smyshlyony struck a Soviet mine on 6 March 1942 and sank the following day as the flooding could not be contained. All but two of her crew perished when she sank.

== Design and description ==
Originally built as a Gnevny-class ship, Smyshlyony and her sister ships were completed to the modified Project 7U design after Joseph Stalin, General Secretary of the Communist Party of the Soviet Union, ordered that the latter be built with their boilers arranged en echelon, instead of linked as in the Gnevnys, so that a ship could still move with one or two boilers disabled.

Like the Gnevnys, the Project 7U destroyers had an overall length of 112.5 meters (369 ft 1 in) and a beam of 10.2 meters (33 ft 6 in), but they had a reduced draft of 3.98 meters (13 ft 1 in) at deep load. The ships were slightly overweight, displacing 1,727 metric tons (1,700 long tons) at standard load and 2,279 metric tons (2,243 long tons) at deep load. The crew complement of the Storozhevoy class numbered 207 in peacetime, but this increased to 271 in wartime, as more personnel were needed to operate additional equipment. Each ship had a pair of geared steam turbines, each driving one propeller, rated to produce 54,000 shaft horsepower (40,000 kW) using steam from four water-tube boilers, which the designers expected would exceed the 37-knot (69 km/h; 43 mph) speed of the Project 7s because there was additional steam available. Some fell short of it, although specific figures for most individual ships have not survived. Variations in fuel oil capacity meant that the range of the Project 7Us varied between 1,380 to 2,700 nautical miles (2,560 to 5,000 km; 1,590 to 3,110 mi) at 19 knots (35 km/h; 22 mph), that upper figure demonstrated by Storozhevoy.

The Project 7U-class ships mounted four 130-millimeter (5.1 in) B-13 guns in two pairs of superfiring single mounts fore and aft of the superstructure. Anti-aircraft (AA) defense was provided by a pair of 76.2-millimeter (3 in) 34-K AA guns in single mounts and three 45-millimeter (1.8 in) 21-K AA guns, as well as four 12.7-millimeter (0.5 in) DK or DShK machine guns. They carried six 533 mm (21 in) torpedo tubes in two rotating triple mounts amidships. The ships could also carry a maximum of 58 to 96 mines and 30 depth charges. They were fitted with a set of Mars hydrophones for anti-submarine work, although these were useless at speeds over 3 knots (5.6 km/h; 3.5 mph).

== Construction and career ==
Smyshlyony was laid down in Shipyard No. 200 (named after 61 Communards) in Nikolayev as yard number 1077 on 15 October 1936 as a Gnevny-class destroyer with the name Polezny. She was relaid down as a Project 7U destroyer on 27 June 1938, and launched on 26 August 1939. The ship was renamed Smyshlyony on 25 September 1940 and was accepted by the navy on 10 November, but the Soviet naval jack was not raised aboard her until 12 April 1941, after the completion of additional work. She participated in joint maneuvers of the Black Sea Fleet and the Odessa Military District between 15 and 20 June along with other destroyers of the 3rd Division.

Following the beginning of Operation Barbarossa, the German invasion of the Soviet Union, on 22 June 1941, the fleet sortied to lay defensive minefields off its base in Sevastopol on the morning of 23 June. That evening, Smyshlyony and the destroyer Besposhchadny, commanded by the leader of the 3rd Destroyer Division, Kharkov sailed to the Danube estuary to support the river monitors of the Danube Flotilla in response to a report of Romanian destroyers leaving the port of Constanța. The destroyers bombarded Romanian troops around Snake Island, supported several amphibious operations and laid and swept mines before returning to Sevastopol on 25 June, without engaging Romanian surface forces.

In the first weeks of the war, the Black Sea Fleet was tasked with disrupting Axis supply lines by bombarding Constanța and its oil tanks. The time of the bombardment was set for 05:00 on 26 June, to be preceded by a 30-minute airstrike by aircraft of the fleet beginning an hour earlier. For the raid, the heavy cruiser Voroshilov and Moskva were to cover the bombardment of the port by the latter's sister ship Kharkov, Smyshlyony and her sister Soobrazitelny. To prevent Axis air attack, the ships began to depart Sevastopol at night, at 18:00 on 25 June. However, before exiting the bay, the ships were ordered back to port because the plan was changed by the People's Commissar for the Navy, Vitse-admiral (Vice Admiral) Nikolay Kuznetsov, who ordered that the two destroyer leaders conduct the bombardment, with the other ships in support. As Smyshlyony steamed out of Sevastopol later that night, one of her paravanes got caught on the seabed, which slowed her down and prevented her from participating in the mission. When the other ships were returning, Smyshlyony rendezvoused with Voroshilov on the next morning and helped to escort the damaged Kharkov back to Sevastopol, putting up anti-aircraft fire against German aircraft.

In the first half of July, Smyshlyony escorted tankers and other merchant ships to Batumi before returning to Sevastopol for the installation of an LFTI degaussing system. The ship supported the defenders of Odessa from 19 August by ferrying troops and supplies and by bombarding Axis troops. She fired 88 shells, silencing a Romanian battery, on 27 August, and on 30 August conducted eight bombardments. After escorting the damaged leader Tashkent back to Sevastopol on 1 September, then escorted three transports from Odessa to Novorossiysk beginning on the next day. Returning to Odessa, Smyshlyony continued to provide fire support, and, during the evacuation of the port in mid-October, she laid a minefield off Ilyichevka in conjunction with the destroyer Bodry on 14 October. The destroyer provided fire support the next day and was one of the last ships to leave the port on 16 October, escorting transports and putting up anti-aircraft fire against German aircraft on the voyage back to Sevastopol.

The following month, Smyshlyony began escorting supply and troop convoys to and from encircled Sevastopol and attacked Axis troops with her main guns. She escorted the tanker Emba, towing a floating dock for an evacuated repair base, from Sevastopol to Poti between 10 and 15 November. Storms on this voyage repeatedly snapped the tow cables, forcing the destroyer to take the dock in tow herself. She began shelling Axis troops near Sevastopol on 23 November and on 28 November stood off Cape Fiolent, escorting the battleship Parizhskaya Kommuna as the latter conducted a bombardment, to which Smyshlyony added 120 shells. Between 28 November and the end of the year, the ship fired almost a thousand shells. After undergoing scheduled preventative maintenance at Tuapse in December, she returned to Sevastopol with reinforcements and bombarded Axis forces, expending more than 800 shells between 22 and 31 December. On 28–30 December, she covered the amphibious landings at Kerch and Feodosia.

Smyshlyony escorted two cargo ships, carrying troops and supplies, from Novorossiysk to Sevastopol beginning on the night of 31 December–1 January 1942 together with the light cruiser Molotov and Tashkent. At Sevastopol, she fired 56 shells from Severnaya Bay at advancing Axis troops. On the evening of New Year's Day, the destroyer departed for Tuapse, then returned on 3 January as an escort for a transport. Arriving at Sevastopol, Smyshlyony fired about 120 shells and returned to Novorossiysk under the cover of darkness. She turned around and returned to Sevastopol with a company of soldiers on board. On 6 January, the ship attempted to land a reinforcing naval infantry battalion at Eupatoria during the Battle of the Kerch Peninsula, but was driven off by heavy German fire and bad weather, returning to Sevastopol. She bombarded German positions at Eupatoria on 16 January as a diversion for a small amphibious landing at Sudak, returning to Tuapse. During a storm on 22 January, the destroyer was slightly damaged by the severed anchor chain of Molotov while anchored, but repairs took her out of action for a month.

Returning to combat, Smyshlyony bombarded a German battery near Feodosia and reported its silencing on the night of 20–21 February, while Molotov and Soobrazitelny fired at other targets. That morning, a storm caused minor damage to her hull, displaying the weak hulls of her class. The destroyer spent nearly a week at sea in late February and early March, bombarding Axis troops near Feodosia and supporting a diversionary assault at Alushta on 27–28 February and 2 and 4 March during a Soviet offensive on the Kerch Peninsula. On her return to Novorossiysk, the destroyer put up anti-aircraft fire against Heinkel He 111s. After escorting a reinforcement convoy to Kerch on 5 March, the ship accidentally entered a Soviet minefield near Zhelezny Rog en route to Novorossiysk on 6 March. She struck a mine that flooded two boiler rooms and knocked out her power, but jury-rigged repairs allowed her to proceed homewards at a speed of eight knots (15 km/h; 9.2 mph), together with Tashkent and Kharkov. Unrepaired leaks gradually flooded her second and third boiler rooms and she lost power again. Stormy weather foiled attempts to tow her back by Kharkov and she gradually sank stern first at 44°43′N 36°45′E on 7 March. As the destroyer sank, her depth charges detonated, creating a shockwave that killed almost all of the crew; only two survivors were rescued. Her captain was among those killed. She was struck from the Soviet Navy on 2 May.

== Sources ==
- Balakin, Sergey (2007). Легендарные "семёрки" Эсминцы "сталинской" серии [Legendary Sevens: Stalin's Destroyer Series] (in Russian). Moscow: Yauza/Eksmo. ISBN 978-5-699-23784-5.
- Berezhnoy, Sergey (2002). Крейсера и миноносцы. Справочник [Guide to Cruisers and Destroyers] (in Russian). Moscow: Voenizdat. ISBN 5-203-01780-8.
- Hervieux, Pierre (2001). "The Romanian Navy at War, 1941–1945". In Preston, Antony (ed.). Warship 2001–2002. London: Conway Maritime Press. pp. 70–88. ISBN 0-85177-901-8.
- Hill, Alexander (2018). Soviet Destroyers of World War II. New Vanguard. Vol. 256. Oxford, UK: Osprey Publishing. ISBN 978-1-4728-2256-7.
- Kachur, Pavel (2008). "Гончие псы" Красного флота. "Ташкент", "Баку", "Ленинград" [Hounds of the Red Fleet: Tashkent, Baku, Leningrad] (in Russian). Moscow: Yauza/Eksmo. ISBN 978-5-699-31614-4.
- Platonov, Andrey V. (2002). Энциклопедия советских надводных кораблей 1941–1945 [Encyclopedia of Soviet Surface Ships 1941–1945] (in Russian). Saint Petersburg: Poligon. ISBN 5-89173-178-9.
- Rohwer, Jürgen (2005). Chronology of the War at Sea 1939–1945: The Naval History of World War Two (Third Revised ed.). Annapolis, Maryland: Naval Institute Press. ISBN 1-59114-119-2.
- Rohwer, Jürgen & Monakov, Mikhail S. (2001). Stalin's Ocean-Going Fleet. London: Frank Cass. ISBN 0-7146-4895-7.
- Yakubov, Vladimir & Worth, Richard (2008). "The Soviet Project 7/7U Destroyers". In Jordan, John & Dent, Stephen (eds.). Warship 2008. London: Conway. pp. 99–114. ISBN 978-1-84486-062-3.
