= Soviet destroyer Soobrazitelny (1940) =

Soviet destroyer

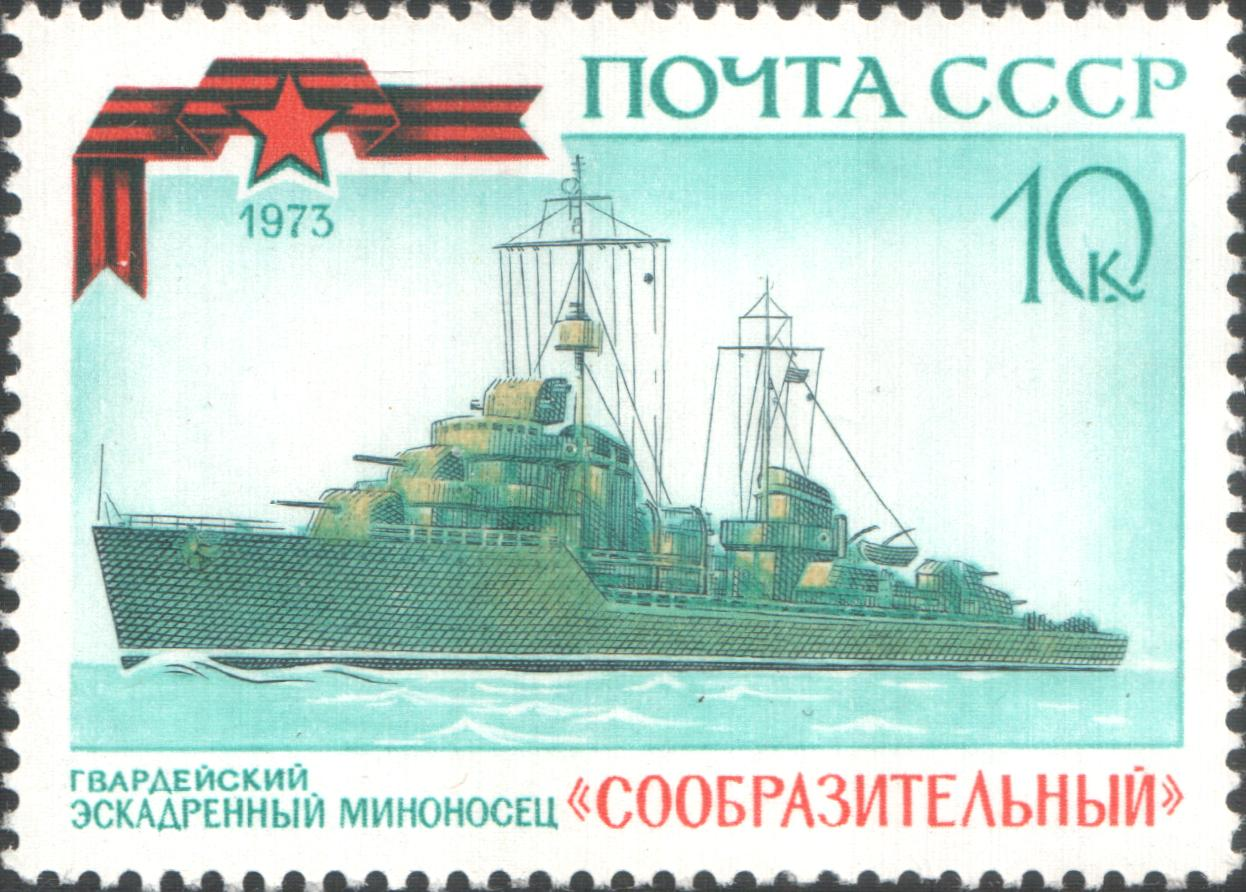
- Soviet stamp depicting Soobrazitelny

History

Soviet Union
- Name: Soobrazitelny (Сообразительный (Astute))
- Builder: Shipyard No. 200 (named after 61 Communards), Nikolayev
- Yard number: 1078
- Laid down: 3 March 1939
- Launched: 26 August 1939
- Commissioned: 7 June 1941
- Renamed: SDK-11, 20 March 1956; SS-16, 12 February 1957; TsL-3, 31 December 1963
- Reclassified: As rescue and decontamination ship, 17 February 1956; As rescue ship, 12 February 1957; As target ship, 14 September 1963
- Stricken: 19 March 1966
- Honors and awards: Guards designation, 2 March 1943
- Fate: Scrapped, 1966–1968

General characteristics
- Class & type: Storozhevoy-class destroyer
- Displacement: 1,727 t (1,700 long tons) (standard); 2,279 t (2,243 long tons) (full load)
- Length: 112.5 m (369 ft 1 in) (o/a)
- Beam: 10.2 m (33 ft 6 in)
- Draft: 3.98 m (13 ft 1 in)
- Installed power: 4 water-tube boilers; 54,000 shp (40,000 kW) (trials)
- Propulsion: 2 shafts, 2 steam turbine sets
- Speed: 36.8 knots (68.2 km/h; 42.3 mph)
- Endurance: 1,380 nmi (2,560 km; 1,590 mi) at 19 knots (35 km/h; 22 mph)
- Complement: 207 (271 wartime)
- Sensors & processing systems: Mars hydrophones
- Armament: 4 × single 130 mm (5.1 in) guns; 2 × single 76.2 mm (3 in) AA guns; 3 × single 45 mm (1.8 in) AA guns; 4 × single 12.7 mm (0.50 in) DK or DShK machine guns; 2 × triple 533 mm (21 in) torpedo tubes; 58–96 mines; 30 depth charges

Soobrazitelny (Russian: Сообразительный, lit. 'Astute') was one of 18 Storozhevoy-class destroyers (officially known as Project 7U) built for the Soviet Navy during the late 1930s. Although she began construction as a Project 7 Gnevny-class destroyer, Soobrazitelny was completed in 1941 to the modified Project 7U design.

Assigned to the Black Sea Fleet, Soobrazitelny entered service a few weeks before Operation Barbarossa, the German invasion of the Soviet Union, began in June 1941. She participated in the Raid on Constanța and provided fire support to the defenders during the Siege of Odessa, in addition to service on escort duty through the remainder of the year. During the Battle of the Kerch Peninsula in early 1942, Soobrazitelny escorted transports and provided fire support for the landings, then herself was used as to transport troops in the last phase of the Siege of Sevastopol. After being repaired in mid-1942, she continued to conduct shore bombardments and participated in several raids on the Romanian coast at the end of the year. Soobrazitelny received the title of Guards in early 1943 and was repaired mid-year, seeing no action for the rest of the war. Postwar, she spent several years under refit and was converted into a rescue ship designated SS-16 in the late 1950s. Reduced to a target ship, she was scrapped in the mid-1960s despite an attempt to have her preserved as a museum ship, the last survivor of her class.

== Design and description ==
Originally built as a Gnevny-class ship, Soobrazitelny and her sister ships were completed to the modified Project 7U design after Joseph Stalin, General Secretary of the Communist Party of the Soviet Union, ordered that the latter be built with their propulsion machinery arranged into separate units so that a single hit could not completely immobilize the ship.

Like the Gnevnys, the Project 7U destroyers had an overall length of 112.5 meters (369 ft 1 in) and a beam of 10.2 meters (33 ft 6 in), but they had a reduced draft of 3.98 meters (13 ft 1 in) at deep load. The ships were slightly overweight, displacing 1,727 metric tons (1,700 long tons) at standard load and 2,279 metric tons (2,243 long tons) at deep load. The crew complement of the Storozhevoy class numbered 207 in peacetime, but this increased to 271 in wartime, as more personnel were needed to operate additional equipment. Each ship had a pair of geared steam turbines, each driving one propeller, rated to produce 54,000 shaft horsepower (40,000 kW) using steam from four water-tube boilers, which the designers expected would exceed the 37-knot (69 km/h; 43 mph) speed of the Project 7s because there was additional steam available. Soobrazitelny herself only reached 36.8 knots (68.2 km/h; 42.3 mph) during her sea trials in 1943. Variations in fuel oil capacity meant that the range of the Project 7Us varied from 1,380 to 2,700 nautical miles (2,560 to 5,000 km; 1,590 to 3,110 mi) at 19 knots (35 km/h; 22 mph), that lower figure demonstrated by Soobrazitelny.

The Project 7U-class ships mounted four 130-millimeter (5.1 in) B-13 guns in two pairs of superfiring single mounts fore and aft of the superstructure, protected by gun shields. Anti-aircraft (AA) defense was provided by a pair of 76.2-millimeter (3 in) 34-K AA guns in single mounts and three 45-millimeter (1.8 in) 21-K AA guns in single mounts, as well as four 12.7-millimeter (0.5 in) DK or DShK machine guns. They carried six 533 mm (21 in) torpedo tubes in two rotating triple mounts amidships. The ships could also carry a maximum of 58 to 96 mines and 30 depth charges. They were fitted with a set of Mars hydrophones for anti-submarine work, although these were useless at speeds over 3 knots (5.6 km/h; 3.5 mph).

=== Modifications ===
By 1943, as a result of a need for increased AA armament due to air attacks, the 45 mm guns aboard Soobrazitelny had been replaced by seven single 37-millimeter (1.5 in) 70-K AA guns, and two twin-gun mounts for 12.7 mm M2 Browning machine guns had also been added. After her 1947 refit, an additional 37 mm gun was added together with four more twin Browning machine gun mounts, replacing the 76 mm guns and DShKs.

Due to the threat of nuclear attack in the early 1950s, Soobrazitelny and several of her sisters were rebuilt as Project 32 rescue and decontamination ships due to their obsolescence as the Soviet Naval Command considered it necessary to have ships capable of rendering assistance to ships attacked by nuclear or other weapons of mass destruction. In the event of war, the rebuilt ships were to conduct nuclear, biological, and chemical reconnaissance in areas that such weapons were used, tow damaged ships as large as light cruisers out of the contaminated zone, assist ship crews in pumping and firefighting and treating wounded, and carry out decontamination of ship interiors. They were also capable of assisting the crews of sunken submarines.

To create space for the additional equipment, the torpedo tubes were removed and the original gun armament replaced by two double 57-millimeter (2.2 in) ZiF-31BS guns. The bridge was widened and a windshield installed, and the mast converted into a tripod mounting antennas for the Lin-M guidance radar, Stvor navigational radar, and Nikhrom identification friend or foe system. Special equipment included a dosimetry unit, chemical-control station, automatic toxic-substances signaling device, foam-extinguishing system, water-protection system for flushing fallout overboard, and two decontamination stations. Two pumps were installed in the former magazines, and winches, cable hangers, compressed air cylinders, and decompression chambers were fitted on the deck and superstructure.

== Construction and career ==
Soobrazitelny was laid down in Shipyard No. 200 (named after 61 Communards) in Nikolayev as yard number 1078 on 15 October 1936 as a Gnevny-class destroyer with the name Prozorlivny. She was relaid down as a Project 7U destroyer on 3 March 1939 and launched on 26 August. The ship was renamed Soobrazitelny on 25 September 1940 and moved to Sevastopol for acceptance trials in late 1940. Senior Lieutenant Sergey Vorkov became captain in November; he would hold the position for the next four years and be promoted to captain 2nd rank before leaving her. The destroyer was accepted by the navy on 10 May 1941 and became part of the Black Sea Fleet on 7 June when the Soviet naval jack was hoisted aboard her. She was assigned to the 3rd Destroyer Division of the Black Sea Fleet Light Forces Detachment together with her completed sisters. Within a few weeks, the German invasion of the Soviet Union, Operation Barbarossa, began.

=== Raid on Constanța and Siege of Odessa ===
Soobrazitelny's first combat operation was the Raid on Constanța, which aimed to disrupt Axis supply lines. She was initially planned to bombard the port together with her sister Smyshleny and the destroyer leader Kharkov, but both Project 7U destroyers instead formed part of the support group with the cruiser Voroshilov. After leaving Sevastopol on the night of 25/26 June, the ships of the support group lost sight of each other in the darkness and only at dawn did Soobrazitelny catch up with Voroshilov. She escorted the damaged Kharkov back to Sevastopol, fending off an attacks by two lone bombers and depth charging what was erroneously thought to be a submarine, which was claimed as sunk.

During July, Soobrazitelny was mostly occupied with escort service. She escorted the transports Dnepr and Chapayev from Feodosia to Sevastopol on 29 August, fending off an attack by two German aircraft off Cape Ai-todor with her guns, although Dnepr was slightly damaged by near misses from bombs. The destroyer steamed to Odessa with Dnepr, arriving in the harbor of the besieged port, under fire from Romanian artillery, on the night of 30/31 August. Over the next three days, Soobrazitelny conducted thirteen bombardments in support of the defenders. She was forced to maneuver and put up smoke screens to avoid Romanian artillery fire, and was attacked by aircraft several times, including a near miss from a Ju 87 dive bomber on 2 September. Having expended 364 130 mm, 80 76 mm, and 327 45 mm shells in Odessa, the ship departed the port for Feodosia on the night of 2/3 September, having been commended by the military council of the Odessa Defense Region for the effectiveness of her fire.

While escorting three transports from Feodosia to Sevastopol between 6 and 7 September, Soobrazitelny had to be towed on the final leg of the route to avoid acoustic mines, which had recently damaged the destroyer Bystry. Between 16 and 21 September, the ship helped to escort transports conveying the 157th Rifle Division from Sevastopol to Odessa. While escorting ships from Sevastopol to Tendra on 23 September, she was sent to assist the damaged destroyer Besposhchadny back to Sevastopol. Soobrazitelny towed Besposhchadny on the next day after the cable from a rescue ship snapped, arriving at Sevastopol on 25 September. In November, she and her sister Sposobny transported 500 soldiers from the Taman Peninsula to Sevastopol at high speed in foggy conditions. Between 15 November and 1 December, the ship bombarded German positions on six days. Together with Sposobny and the destroyer leader Tashkent, Soobrazitelny departed Batumi on 26 November to escort three tankers and the icebreaker Anastas Mikoyan to the Bosporus en route to the Soviet Far East. On the next day, she suffered minor damage in a storm and returned to Tuapse on 29 November, low on fuel.

=== Battle of the Kerch Peninsula and Siege of Sevastopol ===
For the Kerch–Feodosia Landing Operation, Soobrazitelny escorted three transports from Tuapse to Feodosia. On the last day of the year, Captain 1st rank Nikolay Basisty, commanding the naval forces in the operation, hoisted his flag aboard the ship. Clear skies later that day allowed for German air attacks, which Soobrazitelny put up AA fire against on five occasions. In two separate bombardments that day, she fired a total of 122 shells against a German airfield and a suspected troop concentration on the Kerch-Feodosia road. Five bombardments were conducted on New Year's Day 1942 in worsening weather conditions that covered her deck with ice. She continued to provide fire support to the landings and was targeted twice without result by German bombers on 3 January, when she was forced to return to Novorossiysk due to a lack of fuel; Basisty transferred his flag to the destroyer Boyky. In support of the landings, the ship expended 283 130 mm, 144 76 mm, and 146 45 mm shells. During 1941, she had made 43 sorties and escorted 44 transports, covering 13,874 nmi (25,695 km; 15,966 mi) in 1,108 running hours.

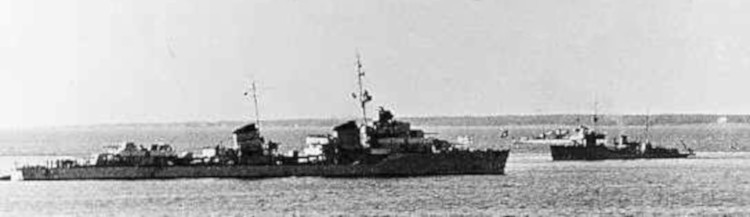
An unidentified Storozhevoy-class destroyer in the Black Sea

Soobrazitelny escorted a transport from Novorossiysk to Feodosia and returned with another between 6 and 9 January. During these sorties, she expended 67 76 mm and 100 45 mm shells against unsuccessful German air attacks. On 15 January she supported the landing at Sudak by transporting 241 soldiers of the 226th Mountain Rifle Regiment of the 63rd Mountain Rifle Division to the bridgehead at Novy Svet Bay. Returning to Novorossiysk on 16 January, she went back to Feodosia to shell advancing German troops a day later. The ship made further sorties to the Kerch Peninsula on 19 and 23 January, bombarding targets near Feodosia and covering another landing at Sudak. The quick action of her captain in taking her out of Novorossiysk harbor during a storm on 22 January allowed her to avoid the damage suffered by other ships there, and Soobrazitelny underwent preventative maintenance in February. After the completion of the latter, she sortied on 21 February, but was forced to return to the base after she was damaged in a storm, including the loss of her mainmast.

Repaired, the ship departed for Sevastopol on 6 March carrying 170 soldiers to reinforce the garrison. She was caught in a storm that night, suffering flooding and having a depth charge mount swept overboard. Nearing Sevastopol, the destroyer was attacked without result by three German bombers and targeted by artillery, forcing her to steam into Severnaya Bay at high speed under a smoke screen. Escaping unscathed, she returned to the Caucasus with the old cruiser Komintern and a transport. After repairs, Soobrazitelny and the destroyer Bditelny supported the Crimean Front by bombarding German positions from Feodosia Gulf in a futile effort to stem the German assault on 9 May during the German offensive against the Kerch Peninsula (Operation Bustard Hunt). She departed Batumi on the night of 25 May with Sposobny and Voroshilov. The warships carried a total of 3,017 soldiers from the 9th Naval Infantry Brigade, 33 field guns, 27 light machine guns, and a significant quantity of ammunition, desperately needed by the defenders of Sevastopol. A few hours from Sevastopol on 27 May, a lone German bomber made an unsuccessful attack. This was followed by constant attacks on the ships until they reached Severnaya Bay. Unloading troops and weapons in a half hour, she departed that night with 301 wounded and 456 convicts aboard. During the next day, Soobrazitelny escaped unscathed from multiple air attacks. Between 26 and 27 May, the destroyer expended 36 130 mm, 121 76 mm, and 212 45 mm shells.

During the next few weeks, Soobrazitelny made constant sorties between bases. She arrived in Novorossiysk from Poti on 27 June, with 305-millimeter (12 in) artillery shells for Sevastopol on deck. While refueling for the voyage to Sevastopol, she was sent to assist the severely damaged Tashkent back to port, taking off 1,975 wounded soldiers and evacuated civilians from the destroyer leader before being relieved by torpedo boats and Bditelny. While at Novorossiysk, Soobrazitelny survived a large air raid on 2 July that sank Tashkent, Bditelny, and a hospital ship. Her AA gunners were training when the raid began and opened fire on the attackers, helping the ship to escape without direct hits. However, a near miss threw debris from a railway track on the pier she was moored to onto the deck and mangled rails that tied the bow to the pier. Due to fears of a further German attack, the destroyer departed for Tuapse after the rails were unbent. She spent July and August under repair.

=== Battle of the Caucasus and end of the war ===
Returned to service, Soobrazitelny fired a total of 345 130 mm shells against German positions on the coast of Tsemes Bay in two separate bombardments on 1 and 2 September as German forces closed in on Novorossiysk. She and Boyky bombarded Yalta on the night of 4 October, targeting a reported concentration of troops and boats transporting German troops from Sevastopol to Kerch. Soobrazitelny expended 203 main-gun shells, one of which was erroneously reported by partisans to have sunk a submarine in Yalta harbor, and drove off an approaching torpedo boat with 76 mm fire. While steaming to Poti in November, five sailors died of burns suffered when a pipe burst in a boiler room, the only losses aboard her during the war.

In late November, the Black Sea Fleet command planned a major raid on the Romanian coastline, involving Voroshilov, Kharkov, and Soobrazitelny in one force under squadron commander Vice Admiral Lev Vladimirsky and two other destroyers in a second force. Soobrazitelny was to serve as escort for Voroshilov while the latter bombarded Romanian-held Snake Island, while herself destroying the radio station on the island. The force departed Batumi on 29 November and arrived off the island at dawn on 1 December. Soobrazitelny expended 196 130 mm and 11 76 mm shells, although the lack of fire correction made the bombardment ineffective. After the end of the bombardment, she snagged a mine on one of her paravanes, revealing a Romanian minefield. The destroyer escaped unscathed, but Voroshilov struck two mines. The flooding aboard the latter was contained and Soobrazitelny escorted her back to the Caucasus, fending off two air attacks en route before reaching Batumi on 2 December. The destroyer returned to the Romanian coast on 12 December to cover a raid of two minesweepers against Romanian shipping, but missed an engagement between the minesweepers and a convoy. The three ships returned to base after two days, with Soobrazitelny again covering a similar operation between 26 and 29 December that ended fruitlessly. During 1942, the destroyer made 102 sorties, covering 27,693 nmi (51,287 km; 31,869 mi) in 1,530 running hours.

Guards flag of the type presented to Soobrazitelny in 1943

External image
- Guards flag presented to Soobrazitelny

Soobrazitelny continued to make sorties between bases in the first half of 1943, and expended a total of 605 130 mm shells in bombardments on 31 January and 4 February against targets near Novorossiysk and in support of the landing at nearby Yuzhnaya Ozereyka. She experienced minor leaks and flooding during a storm while returning from the fire support mission. After another bombardment mission between 22 and 25 February off Novorossiysk and Anapa, she delivered 1,057 soldiers from Tuapse to Gelendzhik and returned with 600 wounded on 26 February. Soobrazitelny was made a Guards ship on 2 March 1943 in recognition of her achievements, though her busy operational tempo delayed the ceremonial presentation of her guards battle flag until 6 June. By this point her machinery was worn out after nearly a year without repairs, and as a result she put in for repairs in August. The loss of three destroyers to German air attack on 6 October 1943 resulted in Stalin's order that forbade the deployment of large warships of the Black Sea Fleet without his express permission; this meant the end of her active participation in the war. The destroyer patrolled south of Livadia during the Yalta Conference in February 1945. During the war, she made 218 sorties, steamed 63,875 nmi (118,296 km; 73,506 mi) in 361 running days, and conducted 52 shore bombardments, expending 2,863 main-gun, 1,215 76 mm, 1,623 45 mm, and 478 37 mm rounds.

=== Postwar ===
Soobrazitelny underwent a major refit at Shipyard No. 445 in Nikolayev between 19 December 1945 and 25 August 1947. She was modernized and rebuilt at Sevmorzavod between 29 December 1951; this became a conversion to a Project 32 rescue and decontamination ship on 17 February 1956. During this period she was renamed SDK-11 on 20 March 1956 and then SS-16 on 12 February 1957, the latter after the Soviet Navy decided to classify her as a regular rescue ship. The conversion was completed in 1958, and SS-16 began sea trials on 17 August before being accepted on 30 September of that year. After a brief period in this auxiliary role, she was mothballed at Sevastopol on 27 March 1960 and reclassified as a target ship on 14 September 1963, receiving the designation TsL-3 on 31 December of that year. A group of Black Sea Fleet veterans petitioned the Main Staff of the Navy in 1965 to have the former destroyer preserved as a museum ship, but were rejected due to the cost and the presence of other naval museums in Sevastopol. Struck from the Soviet Navy on 19 March 1966, the ship was scrapped at Inkerman between 1966 and 1968. She was the last surviving Project 7U destroyer.

== Sources ==
- Balakin, Sergey (2007). Легендарные "семёрки" Эсминцы "сталинской" серии [Legendary Sevens: Stalin's Destroyer Series] (in Russian). Moscow: Yauza/Eksmo. ISBN 978-5-699-23784-5.
- Berezhnoy, Sergey (2002). Крейсера и миноносцы. Справочник [Guide to Cruisers and Destroyers] (in Russian). Moscow: Voenizdat. ISBN 5-203-01780-8.
- Hill, Alexander (2018). Soviet Destroyers of World War II. New Vanguard. Vol. 256. Oxford, UK: Osprey Publishing. ISBN 978-1-4728-2256-7.
- Khorkov, Geliy (1981). Советские надводные корабли в Великой Отечественной войне [Soviet Surface Ships in the Great Patriotic War] (in Russian). Moscow: Voenizdat. OCLC 10593895.
- Platonov, Andrey V. (2002). Энциклопедия советских надводных кораблей 1941–1945 [Encyclopedia of Soviet Surface Ships 1941–1945] (in Russian). Saint Petersburg: Poligon. ISBN 5-89173-178-9.
- Rohwer, Jürgen (2005). Chronology of the War at Sea 1939–1945: The Naval History of World War Two (Third Revised ed.). Annapolis, Maryland: Naval Institute Press. ISBN 1-59114-119-2.
- Rohwer, Jürgen & Monakov, Mikhail S. (2001). Stalin's Ocean-Going Fleet. London: Frank Cass. ISBN 0-7146-4895-7.
- Yakubov, Vladimir & Worth, Richard (2008). "The Soviet Project 7/7U Destroyers". In Jordan, John & Dent, Stephen (eds.). Warship 2008. London: Conway. pp. 99–114. ISBN 978-1-84486-062-3.
