= Soviet destroyer Kharkov =

Destroyer in the Soviet Navy

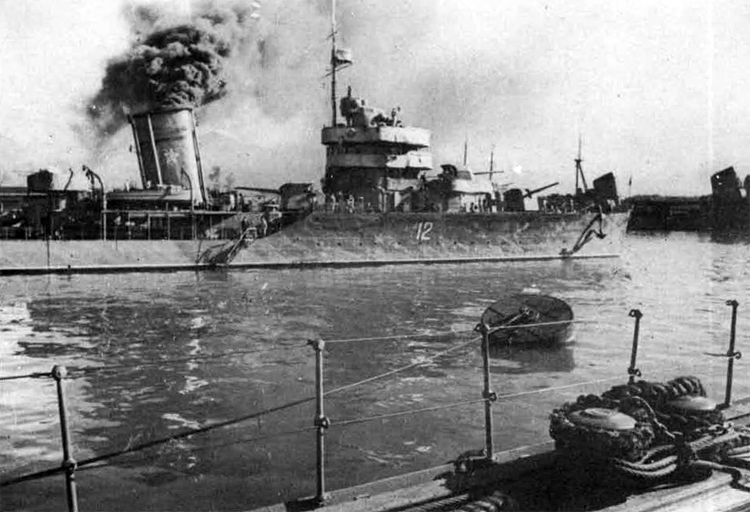
- Kharkov in port

History

Soviet Union
- Name: Kharkov
- Namesake: Kharkov
- Ordered: 1st Five-Year Plan
- Builder: Shipyard No. 198 (Marti South), Nikolayev
- Yard number: 223
- Laid down: 19 October 1932
- Launched: 9 September 1934
- Commissioned: 19 November 1938
- Fate: Sunk by aircraft, 6 October 1943

General characteristics (as built)
- Class & type: Leningrad-class destroyer leader
- Displacement: 2,150 long tons (2,180 t) (standard)
- Length: 127.5 m (418 ft 4 in) (o/a)
- Beam: 11.7 m (38 ft 5 in)
- Draft: 4.06 m (13 ft 4 in)
- Installed power: 3 three-drum boilers; 66,000 shp (49,000 kW)
- Propulsion: 3 shafts; 3 geared steam turbines
- Speed: 40 knots (74 km/h; 46 mph)
- Range: 2,100 nmi (3,900 km; 2,400 mi) at 20 knots (37 km/h; 23 mph)
- Complement: 250 (311 wartime)
- Sensors & processing systems: Arktur hydrophones
- Armament: 5 × single 130 mm (5.1 in) guns; 2 × single 76.2 mm (3 in) AA guns; 2 × single 45 mm (1.8 in) AA guns; 2 × quadruple 533 mm (21 in) torpedo tubes; 68–115 mines; 52 depth charges

Kharkov (Russian: Ха́рьков) was a Leningrad-class destroyer leader built for the Soviet Navy during the 1930s, one of the three Project 1 variants. Completed in 1938, she was slightly damaged during the Raid on Constanța a few days after the German invasion of the Soviet Union had begun on 22 June 1941. The ship covered the evacuation of the Danube Flotilla to Odessa the following month. During the Siege of Odessa and the Siege of Sevastopol in 1941–1942, the ship ferried reinforcements and supplies into those cities, evacuated wounded and refugees and bombarded Axis troop positions. Damaged by German aircraft a few weeks before the surrender of Sevastopol on 4 July, Kharkov was under repair until the beginning of August.

During the Battle of the Caucasus, the ship performed the same missions as she did earlier, bombarding Axis positions and ferrying troops into and wounded men out of ports threatened by the Wehrmacht advance along the Black Sea coast. In February 1943, she supported Soviet forces as they made an amphibious landing behind German lines and then provided naval gunfire support later in the month. Over the next several months Kharkov bombarded German-held ports in the Caucasus and Crimea. While returning from one such mission in October, the ship was damaged by German dive bombers and was sunk while under tow later in the day, together with two other destroyers.

== Design and description ==
Impressed by the French large destroyer (contre-torpilleur) designs such as the Vauquelin class of the early 1930s, the Soviets designed their own version. The Leningrads had an overall length of 127.5 meters (418 ft 4 in) and were 122 meters (400 ft 3 in) long at the waterline. The ships had a beam of 11.7 meters (38 ft 5 in), and a draft of 4.06 meters (13 ft 4 in) at deep load. Built in two batches, the first batch (Project 1) displaced 2,150 long tons (2,180 t) at standard load and 2,582 long tons (2,623 t) at deep load. Their crew numbered 250 officers and sailors in peacetime and 311 in wartime. The ships had three geared steam turbines, each driving one propeller, designed to produce 66,000 shaft horsepower (49,000 kW) using steam from three three-drum boilers which was intended to give them a maximum speed of 40 knots (74 km/h; 46 mph). The Leningrads carried enough fuel oil to give them a range of 2,100 nautical miles (3,900 km; 2,400 mi) at 20 knots (37 km/h; 23 mph).

As built, the Leningrad-class ships mounted five 130-millimeter (5.1 in) B-13 guns in two pairs of superfiring single mounts fore and aft of the superstructure and another mount between the bridge and the forward funnel. The guns were protected by gun shields. Anti-aircraft defense was provided by a pair of 76.2-millimeter (3 in) 34-K AA guns in single mounts on the aft superstructure and a pair of 45-millimeter (1.8 in) 21-K AA guns mounted on either side of the bridge as well as a dozen 12.7-millimeter (0.50 in) M2 Browning machine guns in six twin-gun mounts. They carried eight 533 mm (21.0 in) torpedo tubes in two rotating quadruple mounts; each tube was provided with a reload. The ships could also carry a maximum of either 68 or 115 mines and 52 depth charges. They were fitted with a set of Arktur hydrophones for anti-submarine detection.

=== Modifications ===
Before her loss in 1943, Kharkov exchanged her two 21-K mounts for six 37-millimeter (1.5 in) 70-K AA guns.

== Construction and career ==
Kharkov, named after the temporary capital of the Ukrainian Soviet Socialist Republic, was laid down on 19 October 1932 at Shipyard No. 198 (Marti South) in Nikolayev as yard number 223 and launched on 9 September 1934. Towed to Shipyard No. 201 in Sevastopol for completion, Kharkov was commissioned on 19 November 1938 and was assigned to the Black Sea Fleet. She served as the leader of the 3rd Destroyer Division of its Light Forces Detachment from May 1940, participating in training exercises. In event of a Romanian attack on the Soviet Union, Kharkov, as part of the Black Sea Fleet, was to destroy or capture the Romanian fleet and cut communications, blockade the Romanian coast, support a potential amphibious landing and Soviet troops advancing along the Black Sea coast. To practice this plan, she participated in exercises with the Red Army's 9th Special Rifle Corps between 4 and 19 June 1941, supporting a mock amphibious landing on the west coast of Crimea, near Tendra. The destroyer returned to her moorings at Severanaya Bay in Sevastopol on 21 June.

Following the beginning of Operation Barbarossa, the German invasion of the Soviet Union, on 22 June 1941, the fleet sortied to lay defensive minefields off its base in Sevastopol on the morning of 23 June. The following day, Kharkov and the destroyers Smyshleny and Besposhchadny of the 3rd Destroyer Division sailed to the Danube estuary to support the river monitors of the Danube Flotilla in response to a report of Romanian destroyers leaving the port of Constanța. The destroyers bombarded Romanian troops around Snake Island, supported several amphibious operations and laid and swept mines before returning to Sevastopol on 25 June, without engaging Romanian surface forces.

=== Raid on Constanța ===
In the first weeks of the war, the squadron of the Black Sea Fleet was tasked with disrupting Axis supply lines by bombarding Constanța and its oil tanks. The time of the bombardment was set for 05:00 on 26 June, to be preceded by a 30-minute airstrike by aircraft of the fleet beginning an hour earlier. For the raid, the heavy cruiser Voroshilov and Moskva were to cover the bombardment of the port by the latter's sister ship Kharkov, Smyshleny and the destroyer Soobrazitelny. To prevent Axis air attack, the ships began to depart Sevastopol at night, at 18:00 on 25 June. However, before exiting the bay, the ships were ordered back to port because the plan was changed by the People's Commissar for the Navy, Vitse-admiral (Vice Admiral) Nikolay Kuznetsov, who ordered that the two destroyer leaders conduct the bombardment, with the other ships in support. Moskva and Kharkov departed Sevastopol Bay at 20:10, initially heading towards Odessa as a deception measure and then turning towards their destination slightly more than an hour later, followed by the support group.

On the morning of 26 June, Kharkov and Moskva bombarded Constanţa, although the airstrike was not carried out. The sisters fired 350 rounds between them at oil tanks and railway stations from a range of about 20 km (12 mi), blowing up an ammunition train and inflicting considerable damage. As they were preparing to depart at 04:16 after having fired for 10 minutes, they were engaged by German coastal artillery and the Romanian destroyers Regina Maria and Mărăști at ranges between 11,000 to 16,000 m (12,000 to 17,000 yd). Shortly afterwards, Moskva struck a mine which broke the ship in half; prior to the raid, the ships conducting it were not given precise charts of minefield locations. Later that morning, Kharkov briefly had her steering knocked out by a near miss from a German bomber. At 06:43 the Soviet submarine Shch-206 attacked and missed Kharkov with one torpedo and then missed Soobrazitelny with two more at 07:00.

=== Subsequent activities ===
Kharkov was repaired by 18 July and, together with the light cruiser Komintern and the destroyers Smyshlennyy, Bodry and Shaumyan and numerous smaller craft, covered the retreat of the Danube Flotilla to Odessa during the next several days. Kharkov bombarded Axis positions multiple times during the Siege of Odessa and helped to escort the evacuation convoys from Odessa to Sevastopol in October. During the Siege of Sevastopol she provided gunfire support and evacuated cut-off troops from elsewhere in the Crimea into Sevastopol and brought in reinforcements from Caucasian ports. The ship helped to transport the 388th Rifle Division from Novorossisk and Tuapse to Sevastopol between 7–13 December, the 79th Naval Rifle Brigade on 19–20 December and the 354th Rifle Division between 21–22 December, bombarding German positions in the interim. Between February and July 1942, Kharkov bombarded German troops many times and brought in reinforcements and supplies for Sevastopol, evacuating wounded and refugees as she returned to port. On 18 June, the ship's steering was knocked out by near misses by German bombers and she had to be towed by the flotilla leader Tashkent.

After repairs Kharkov bombarded Axis positions near Feodosiya on 2–3 August and provided fire support for the defenders of Novorossiysk on 1–4 September. Between 8–11 September she ferried the 137th and 145th Rifle Regiments along with the 3rd Naval Rifle Brigade from Poti to Tuapse and Gelendzhik and a month later she transported 12,600 men of the 8th, 9th and 10th Guards Rifle Brigades from Poti to Tuapse to reinforce the defenses there between 20 and 23 October. On 29 November 1942 she escorted Voroshilov on a mission to bombard Axis positions on Feodonisi and bombarded Yalta during the night of 19/20 December. On the night of 4 February 1943, the Soviets made a series of amphibious landings to the west of Novorossiysk, behind German lines. Kharkov, the light cruisers Krasnyi Kavkaz and Krasnyi Krym, and Besposhchadny and Soobrazitelny provided fire support for the main landing, but the Soviet troops there were wiped out by 6 February, although one secondary landing was successful. Kharkov bombarded German positions near Novorossiysk again on the night of 21–22 February. Anapa was bombarded on the night of 13/14 May and Feodosiya on 22/23 May. During the night of 5/6 October 1943 Kharkov and the destroyers Besposhchadny and Sposobny bombarded Yalta, Alushta and Feodosia and were attacked by Junkers Ju 87 Stuka dive bombers of III./StG 3 on their return voyage. Kharkov was damaged by their first attack and had to be towed by Sposobny. The second attack damaged all three ships and Sposobny took Besposhchadny under tow as well. The next attack sank both Kharkov, by a direct hit from Hubert Pölz, and Besposhchadny. Sposobny was sunk by the fourth wave while trying to rescue survivors. This incident prompted Stalin to issue an order forbidding the use of ships destroyer-sized and larger without his express permission.

== Bibliography ==
- Breyer, Siegfried (1992). Soviet Warship Development: Volume 1: 1917–1937. London: Conway Maritime Press. ISBN 0-85177-604-3.
- Budzbon, Przemysław (1980). "Soviet Union". In Chesneau, Roger (ed.). Conway's All the World's Fighting Ships 1922–1946. Greenwich, UK: Conway Maritime Press. pp. 318–346. ISBN 0-85177-146-7.
- Budzbon, Przemysław; Radziemski, Jan & Twardowski, Marek (2022). Warships of the Soviet Fleets 1939–1945. Vol. I: Major Combatants. Annapolis, Maryland: Naval Institute Press. ISBN 978-1-68247-877-6.
- Hervieux, Pierre (2001). "The Romanian Navy at War, 1941–1945". In Preston, Antony (ed.). Warship 2001–2002. London: Conway Maritime Press. pp. 70–88. ISBN 0-85177-901-8.
- Hill, Alexander (2018). Soviet Destroyers of World War II. New Vanguard. Vol. 256. Oxford, UK: Osprey Publishing. ISBN 978-1-4728-2256-7.
- Obermaier, Ernst (1976). Die Ritterkreuzträger der Luftwaffe 1939–1945 Band II Stuka- und Schlachtflieger [The Knight's Cross Bearers of the Luftwaffe 1939–1945 Volume II Dive Bomber and Attack Aircraft] (in German). Mainz, Germany: Verlag Dieter Hoffmann. ISBN 978-3-87341-021-3.
- Kachur, Pavel (2008). "Гончие псы" Красного флота. "Ташкент", "Баку", "Ленинград" [Hounds of the Red Fleet: Tashkent, Baku, Leningrad] (in Russian). Moscow: Yauza/Eksmo. ISBN 978-5-699-31614-4.
- Komoedov, V.P., ed. (2002). Черноморский флот России: Исторический очерк [Black Sea Fleet of Russia: Historical Essay] (in Russian). Simferopol: Tavrida. ISBN 966-584-194-7.
- Rohwer, Jürgen (2005). Chronology of the War at Sea 1939–1945: The Naval History of World War Two (Third Revised ed.). Annapolis, Maryland: Naval Institute Press. ISBN 1-59114-119-2.
- Rohwer, Jürgen & Monakov, Mikhail S. (2001). Stalin's Ocean-Going Fleet. London: Frank Cass. ISBN 0-7146-4895-7.
