= Soviet destroyer Shaumyan =

Russian Fidonisy-class destroyer

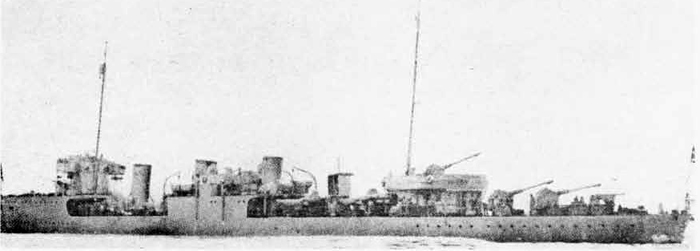
- Shaumyan

History

Russian Empire
- Name: Levkas (Левкас)
- Namesake: Russian capture of Lefkada
- Ordered: 17 March 1915
- Builder: Russud Shipyard, Nikolayev
- Cost: 2.2 million rubles
- Laid down: 23 May 1916
- Launched: 10 October 1917
- Fate: Captured by Germany, the Ukrainian People's Army, the Armed Forces of South Russia, and the Red Army

Soviet Union
- Name: Levkas
- Acquired: 1920
- Commissioned: 10 December 1925
- Renamed: Shaumyan (Шаумян), 5 February 1925
- Fate: Ran aground, 3 April 1942, and subsequently destroyed

General characteristics
- Class & type: Fidonisy-class destroyer
- Displacement: 1,760 long tons (1,790 t) (full load)
- Length: 93.26 m (306 ft 0 in) (o/a)
- Beam: 9.07 m (29 ft 9 in)
- Draft: 4.04 m (13 ft 3 in) (full load)
- Installed power: 5 Thornycroft boilers; 29,000 shp (22,000 kW)
- Propulsion: 2 shafts; 2 steam turbines
- Speed: 33 knots (61 km/h; 38 mph)
- Range: 2,130 nmi (3,940 km; 2,450 mi) at 18 knots (33 km/h; 21 mph)
- Complement: 136
- Armament: 4 × single 102 mm (4 in) guns; 1 × single 76 mm (3 in) AA gun; 1 × single 37-millimeter (1.5 in) AA gun; 4 × single 7.62 mm (0.3 in) machine guns; 4 × triple 450 mm (17.7 in) torpedo tubes; 80 mines

Shaumyan (Шаумян) was one of eight Fidonisy-class destroyers built for the Imperial Russian Navy during World War I. She was originally named Levkas (Левкас) before she was renamed Shaumyan in 1925. Left unfinished during the Russian Revolution in 1917 and later captured by Ukrainian and White forces, the destroyer was completed by the Soviets in 1925 following their victory in the Russian Civil War.

Serving with the Black Sea Fleet, she made several international port visits and was refitted twice during the interwar period. The destroyer served in the Black Sea during the German invasion of the Soviet Union (Operation Barbarossa) in June 1941 and covered the evacuation of the Danube Flotilla to Odessa the following month. Later she helped to evacuate Odessa, supply besieged Soviet forces in Sevastopol, and supported the Kerch–Feodosiya Amphibious Operation. She was wrecked when she ran aground near Gelendzhik in April 1942. The ship was later disarmed, with her guns used for a coastal artillery battery. The remains of her hull were salvaged for scrap postwar.

== Design and description ==
The Fidonisy-class ships were designed as improved version of the Derzky class with an additional 102-millimeter (4 in) gun. Levkas displaced 1,760 long tons (1,790 t) at full load with an overall length of 93.26 meters (306 ft 0 in), a beam of 9.07 meters (29 ft 9 in), and a draft of 4.04 meters (13 ft 3 in) at full load. She was propelled by two Parsons steam turbines, each driving one propeller, designed to produce a total of 29,000 shaft horsepower (22,000 kW) using steam from five 3-drum Thorneycroft boilers for an intended maximum speed of 33 knots (61 km/h; 38 mph). During her sea trials, the ship reached a speed of 30.63 knots (56.73 km/h; 35.25 mph) from 27,740 shp (20,690 kW). Her crew numbered 136 or 137. Levkas carried enough fuel oil to give her a range of 2,130 nautical miles (3,940 km; 2,450 mi) at 18 knots (33 km/h; 21 mph).

The Fidonisy-class ships mounted a main armament of four single 102 mm Pattern 1911 Obukhov guns, one on the forecastle and three aft; one of these latter guns was superfiring over the other two. Anti-aircraft defense for Levkas and her sisters that were completed after the war was provided by a single 76.2-millimeter (3 in) Lender gun on the stern, a 37-millimeter (1.5 in) Maxim cannon, and four 7.62-millimeter (0.3 in) M-1 machine guns. The destroyers mounted four triple 450-millimeter (17.7 in) torpedo tube mounts amidships with a pair of reload torpedoes and could carry 80 M1908 naval mines. They were also fitted with a Barr and Stroud rangefinder and two 60-centimeter (24 in) searchlights.

=== Modifications ===
A second 76.2 mm gun on the stern was added during her 1928–1930 refit, as was a 37-millimeter (1.5 in) Maxim cannon, and she was equipped to carry 60 M1926 mines. During her 1935 refit, the destroyer received four 12.7-millimeter (0.50 in) DShK machine guns on the forward and aft bridges, replacing the 7.62 mm machine guns, in addition to an AM-3 rangefinder. During the 1930s she was also fitted with 42 depth charges and two K-1 paravanes. A pair of depth-charge throwers were added later.

== Construction and service ==
The eight Fidonisy-class destroyers were ordered on 17 March 1915 at a cost of 2.2 million rubles each. All of the ships received names in honor of the victories of Admiral Fyodor Ushakov. Among these was Levkas, an alternate name for Lefkada, commemorating Ushakov's victory there during his 1798–1799 campaign in the Ionian Islands. After being added to the Black Sea Fleet ship list on 2 July 1915, Levkas was laid down in the Russud Shipyard in Nikolayev on 23 May 1916 and launched on 10 October 1917. Construction halted after the Russian Revolution and on 17 March 1918 the shipyard was captured by German troops, followed by the Ukrainian People's Army and the White Armed Forces of South Russia. When a White commission examined her, they found that the hull was completed, the propeller shafts and screws were installed, and that the boilers and some machinery were ready for installation. In early 1920 the shipyard was captured by the Red Army. The Council of Labor and Defense ordered the completion of Levkas and her sister ship Korfu on 2 September 1924 without modification. By early 1925 the installation of machinery and armament was completed. Renamed Shaumyan on 5 February 1925 in honor of the martyred Armenian Bolshevik Stepan Shaumian, the contract for her completion was signed on 13 August. Ready for trials by 19 October 1925, she entered service with the Black Sea Naval Forces on 10 December of that year when the navy officially accepted her.

=== Interwar period ===
Along with the rest of the other ships of the Black Sea Naval Forces, Shaumyan participated in maneuvers with Red Army forces at Odessa involving a practice landing between 21 and 22 September 1927; she was visited by People's Commissar for Military and Naval Affairs Kliment Voroshilov and Chief of the Red Army Naval Forces Directorate Romuald Muklevich after the exercise. The destroyer visited Istanbul, Turkey, between 27 May and 7 June 1928 alongside cruiser Chervona Ukraina and destroyers Petrovsky and Frunze as part of the Black Sea Naval Forces' Separate Destroyer Division. During the voyage they conducted combat training, including exercises with the Batumi Coastal Defense Region.

Shaumyan began a refit at Sevmorzavod on 5 October. After the completion of the refit on 16 July 1930, she cruised to Istanbul (3 to 5 October), Messina, Italy, (7 to 10 October), and Piraeus, Greece, (11 to 14 October) with Chervona Ukraina and her sister Nezamozhnik, practicing maneuvering in minefields and repelling attacks from submarines, destroyers, and torpedo boats. With cruiser Krasny Kavkaz and Petrovsky, the destroyer made another Mediterranean cruise in late 1933, departing Sevastopol on 17 October. The ships arrived in Istanbul on the next day, at Piraeus on 23 October, and made an official visit to Naples, Italy, between 30 October and 2 November, returning to Sevastopol on the night of 7 November. Shaumyan was again refitted at Sevmorzavod in 1935, becoming part of the revived Soviet Black Sea Fleet on 11 January of that year. She tested the new 76 mm anti-aircraft gun (34-K) in May and June of that year. The gun was installed on the new Gnevny-class destroyers but not on Shaumyan due to its weight and the priorities of the Soviet Navy.

=== World War II ===
She was part of the 1st Destroyer Division of the fleet at Sevastopol by 22 June 1941, when the Germans invaded of the Soviet Union. The destroyer was assigned to cover the evacuation of the Danube Flotilla to Odessa on 17 July and the 14th Rifle Corps from the Chilia branch of the Danube River to Odessa on 18–19 July. Shaumyan and the minesweeper Tshch-27 laid a minefield off the mouth of the Chilia branch on 23 July, with the destroyer laying 50 M1926 mines. She was assigned to a force tasked to support Soviet troops on 9 August and provided gunfire support for a counterattack by the 1st Naval Rifle Regiment four days later. On 14–17 August, Shaumyan helped to escort the incomplete ships being evacuated from the shipyards at Nikolayev. Together with the light cruisers Chervona Ukraina and Komintern, and the destroyers Besposhchadny and Boyky, Shaumyan and her sister Nezamozhnik bombarded Axis positions west of Odessa on 1–2 September. In return, Shaumyan was struck in the navigation bridge by a shell on 1 September, wounding nine crewmen. The following day she arrived at Sevastopol for repairs that were completed by the 27th when the ship returned to Odessa and towed the crippled Besposhchadny to Sevastopol.

On 3–6 October, the ship was one of the escorts for the convoys evacuating the 157th Rifle Division from a bridgehead outside Odessa to Sevastopol. She covered evacuation convoys from Odessa on 8–10 October as well as the final convoy on the night of 15–16 October, towing the damaged transport Gruziya. After the evacuation of Odessa, Shaumyan supported the defense of Sevastopol from 29 October when she and Nezamozhnik were assigned to another naval bombardment group, this time with the light cruisers Krasnyi Krym and Chervona Ukraina and the destroyer Bodry. This was not her only task as the ship helped to evacuate cut-off Soviet troops from pockets along the Black Sea coast to Sevastopol from 1 to 9 November. After Besposhchadny was badly damaged during an airstrike, Shaumyan towed her to Poti, Georgia, to be repaired on 17 November.

The destroyer supported the Kerch-Feodosia amphibious operation on 29 December where her mainmast was struck by a shell that killed two men and wounded seven others. Shaumyan briefly ran aground in Novorossiysk harbor on 13 January 1942, but was pulled off with damage later that day. During the first amphibious landing at Sudak on 15–16 January, the ship off-loaded troops and delivered more on 24–25 January. In February and March she escorted convoys and transported troops and supplies to Sevastopol. As opportunity presented, Shaumyan bombarded Axis positions; firing 37 main-gun shells at an airfield near Saky on 19 February and 78 shells at Yalta harbor on 28 February. The ship participated in a diversionary landing near Alushta on the evening of 1 March, where she fired 55 shells from her main guns. On 3 April she ran aground and punctured her hull in the area of Gelendzhik while steaming from Novorossiysk to Poti after being attacked by German aircraft. The destroyer was officially struck from the Navy List on 3 June after she was disarmed as she could not fire from her position; her 102 mm guns formed a coastal defense battery defending the Novorossiysk Naval Base. The half-submerged ship was subsequently destroyed by German aircraft and storms. Postwar, the wreck was almost completely salvaged for scrap.

== Bibliography ==
- Apalkov, Yu. V. (1996). Боевые корабли Русского флота 8.1914-10.1917 гг. Справочник [Directory of Russian Navy Warships, August 1914–October 1917] (in Russian). Intek. ISBN 5-7559-0018-3.
- Berezhnoy, Sergey (2002). Крейсера и миноносцы. Справочник [Guide to Cruisers and Destroyers] (in Russian). Voenizdat. ISBN 5-203-01780-8.
- Breyer, Siegfried (1992). Soviet Warship Development: Volume 1: 1917–1937. Conway Maritime Press. ISBN 0-85177-604-3.
- Chernyshev, Alexander (2011). Русские суперэсминцы. Легендарные "Новики" [Russian Superdestroyers: Legendary Noviks] (in Russian) (2nd ed.). Yauza/Eksmo. ISBN 978-5-699-53144-8.
- Hill, Alexander (2018). Soviet Destroyers of World War II. New Vanguard. Vol. 256. Osprey Publishing. ISBN 978-1-4728-2256-7.
- Platonov, Andrey V. (2002). Энциклопедия советских надводных кораблей 1941–1945 [Encyclopedia of Soviet Surface Ships 1941–1945] (in Russian). Poligon. ISBN 5-89173-178-9.
- Rohwer, Jürgen (2005). Chronology of the War at Sea 1939–1945: The Naval History of World War Two (Third Revised ed.). Naval Institute Press. ISBN 1-59114-119-2.
- Verstyuk, Anatoly & Gordeyev, Stanislav (2006). Корабли Минных дивизий. От "Новика" до "Гогланда" [Torpedo Division Ships: From Novik to Gogland] (in Russian). Voennaya Kniga. ISBN 5-902863-10-4.
