= Soviet destroyer Besposhchadny =

Gnevny-class destroyer built for the Soviet Navy

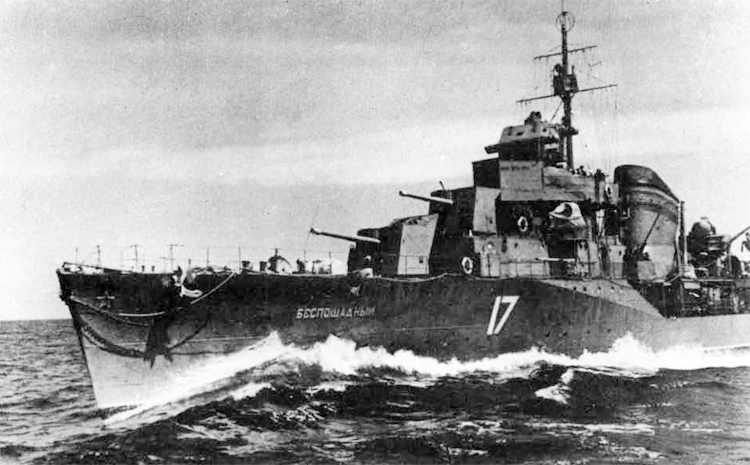
- Besposhchadny at sea

History

Soviet Union
- Name: Besposhchadny
- Ordered: 2nd Five-Year Plan
- Builder: Shipyard No. 198 (Andre Marti (South)), Nikolayev
- Laid down: 15 May 1936
- Launched: 5 December 1936
- Completed: 22 August 1939
- Commissioned: 2 October 1939
- Honors and awards: Order of the Red Banner, 4 April 1942
- Fate: Sunk by aircraft, 6 October 1943

General characteristics (Gnevny as completed, 1938)
- Class & type: Gnevny-class destroyer
- Displacement: 1,612 t (1,587 long tons) (standard)
- Length: 112.8 m (370 ft 1 in) (o/a)
- Beam: 10.2 m (33 ft 6 in)
- Draft: 4.8 m (15 ft 9 in)
- Installed power: 3 water-tube boilers; 48,000 shp (36,000 kW)
- Propulsion: 2 shafts; 2 geared steam turbines
- Speed: 38 knots (70 km/h; 44 mph)
- Range: 2,720 nmi (5,040 km; 3,130 mi) at 19 knots (35 km/h; 22 mph)
- Complement: 197 (236 wartime)
- Sensors & processing systems: Mars hydrophone
- Armament: 4 × single 130 mm (5.1 in) guns; 2 × single 76.2 mm (3 in) AA guns; 2 × single 45 mm (1.8 in) AA guns; 2 × single 12.7 mm (0.50 in) AA machineguns; 2 × triple 533 mm (21 in) torpedo tubes; 60–96 mines; 2 × depth charge racks, 25 depth charges

Besposhchadny was one of 29 Gnevny-class destroyers (officially known as Project 7) built for the Soviet Navy during the late 1930s. Completed in 1939, she was assigned to the Black Sea Fleet. After the start of the German invasion of the Soviet Union (Operation Barbarossa) in June 1941, the ship helped to lay minefields off Sevastopol. During the Siege of Odessa the ship transported troops and supplies while providing naval gunfire support to the defenders until she was crippled by German dive bombers in September. Besposhchadny was further damaged by bombs while still under repair in November and they were not completed for almost another year.

The ship ferried troops and supplies for the rest of the year and then provided fire support during an amphibious landing behind German lines in the Caucasus in February 1943. She later bombarded Axis positions and unsuccessfully attempted to intercept German convoys off the Crimea. After a one such attempt, Besposhchadny and two other destroyers were attacked by German aircraft in October. After repeated attacks, she was sunk with only 41 survivors.

== Design and description ==
Having decided to build the large and expensive 40-knot (74 km/h; 46 mph) Leningrad-class destroyer leaders, the Soviet Navy sought Italian assistance in designing smaller and cheaper destroyers. They licensed the plans for the Folgore class and, in modifying it for their purposes, overloaded a design that was already somewhat marginally stable.

The Gnevnys had an overall length of 112.8 meters (370 ft 1 in), a beam of 10.2 meters (33 ft 6 in), and a draft of 4.8 meters (15 ft 9 in) at deep load. The ships were significantly overweight, almost 200 metric tons (197 long tons) heavier than designed, displacing 1,612 metric tons (1,587 long tons) at standard load and 2,039 metric tons (2,007 long tons) at deep load. Their crew numbered 197 officers and sailors in peacetime and 236 in wartime. The ships had a pair of geared steam turbines, each driving one propeller, rated to produce 48,000 shaft horsepower (36,000 kW) using steam from three water-tube boilers which was intended to give them a maximum speed of 37 knots (69 km/h; 43 mph). The designers had been conservative in rating the turbines and many, but not all, of the ships handily exceeded their designed speed during their sea trials. Variations in fuel oil capacity meant that the range of the Gnevnys varied between 1,670 to 3,145 nautical miles (3,093 to 5,825 km; 1,922 to 3,619 mi) at 19 knots (35 km/h; 22 mph).

As built, the Gnevny-class ships mounted four 130-millimeter (5.1 in) B-13 guns in two pairs of superfiring single mounts fore and aft of the superstructure. Anti-aircraft defense was provided by a pair of 76.2-millimeter (3 in) 34-K AA guns in single mounts and a pair of 45-millimeter (1.8 in) 21-K AA guns as well as two 12.7-millimeter (0.50 in) DK or DShK machine guns. They carried six 533 mm (21.0 in) torpedo tubes in two rotating triple mounts; each tube was provided with a reload. The ships could also carry a maximum of either 60 or 95 mines and 25 depth charges. They were fitted with a set of Mars hydrophones for anti-submarine work, although they were useless at speeds over 3 knots (5.6 km/h; 3.5 mph). The ships were equipped with two K-1 paravanes intended to destroy mines and a pair of depth-charge throwers.

== Construction and service ==
Built in Nikolayev's Shipyard No. 198 (Andre Marti (South)) as yard number 322, Besposhchadny was laid down on 15 May 1936. The ship was completed on 22 August 1939 and was commissioned into the Black Sea Fleet on 2 October 1939. When the Germans invaded the Soviet Union on 22 June 1941, the ship was assigned to the 2nd Destroyer Division of the Black Sea Fleet. On 23–25 June Besposhchadny laid 114 defensive mines off Sevastopol. On 9 July, the 2nd Destroyer Division, including the destroyer leader Kharkov, Besposhchadny and her sister ships Bodry, Boyky and Bezuprechny made an unsuccessful attempt to interdict Axis shipping near Fidonisi. Besposhchadny ran aground near the Eupatoria lighthouse on 14 July and damaged her propellers. After repairs, she began escorting cargo ships to Odessa while also transporting supplies and troops there. In addition, the ship provided gunfire support. On 14–17 August, Besposhchadny escorted the incomplete ships being evacuated from the shipyards at Nikolayev. The destroyer helped to escort transports ferrying the 157th Rifle Division to Odessa on 16–21 September. While providing fire support during the amphibious landing at Grigorievka on 22 September, Besposhchadny was attacked by Junkers Ju 87 Stuka dive bombers of StG 77. They nearly blew her bow off and she steamed to Odessa for emergency repairs. The following day, she was towed, stern-first, to Sevastopol by the destroyer Soobrazitelny. The ship was repaired using the salvaged bow from her sunken sister Bystry. While still under repair, Besposhchadny was attacked by Stukas from StG 77 on 12 November; they hit her once in the aft boiler room and near missed her several times. The bombs badly damaged her propulsion machinery and started a large fire. She was drydocked for emergency repairs on the 14th and was towed to Poti, Georgia three days later by the destroyer Shaumyan for further repairs that lasted until September 1942.

While still under repair, Besposhchadny was awarded the Order of the Red Banner on 4 April. The ship completed her post-repair sea trials and working up by 9 October and helped to ferry the 8th, 9th and 10th Guards Rifle Brigades and other troops from Poti to Tuapse on 19–28 October. On 29 November, Besposhchadny and Boyky were tasked to attack Axis shipping off the Bulgarian coast and to bombard the port of Mangalia, Romania. They failed to locate any ships and mistook coastal rocks for a convoy in heavy fog on 1 December, firing 141 shells from their main guns and six torpedoes at them. Besposhchadny, together with the light cruiser Krasnyi Krym and the destroyer Nezamozhnik, transported the 9th Mountain Rifle Division and other troops from Batumi, Georgia, to Tuapse in early December. Together with Soobrazitelny, Besposhchadny covered the sortie of a division of minesweepers off the Romanian coast and then unsuccessfully patrolled south of Fidonisi themselves on 26–29 December.

The destroyer bombarded German positions around Novorossiysk on 1 February 1943 with 206 shells from her 130 mm guns. On 4 February, she provided fire support during the amphibious landing west of Novorossiysk, firing 151 illumination and 56 high-explosive shells. Besposhchadny fired 105 shells at Axis troops near Anapa on 13 February. During the rest of the month, the ship helped to ferry 8,037 troops from Tuapse to Gelendzhik. On the night of 30 April/1 May, Boyky and Besposhchadny shelled Axis positions on the Kerch Peninsula and then the ship bombarded Alushta on the night of 20/21 May. Boyky and Besposhchadny, together with the destroyer Sposobny made an unsuccessful attempt on 30 September to intercept German transports evacuating troops and equipment from the Kuban Bridgehead. During the night of 5/6 October, Kharkov, Besposhchadny and Sposobny attempted to intercept German evacuation convoys off the Crimean coast, but were again unsuccessful. Kharkov bombarded Yalta and Alushta while the two smaller destroyers steamed to do the same to Feodosia. The latter pair were attacked by five S-boats of the 1st S-Boat Flotilla en route. The Germans failed to damage either destroyer and Sposobny claimed one hit on S-45. On their way home the three ships were spotted by German reconnaissance aircraft and were attacked by Stukas of III./StG 3. Kharkov was damaged by their first attack and had to be towed by Sposobny. The second attack damaged all three ships and Sposobny alternated towing Besposhchadny and Kharkov. The next attack sank both Kharkov and Besposhchadny with only 41 crewmen rescued from the latter. This incident prompted Stalin to issue an order forbidding the use of ships destroyer-sized and larger without his express permission.

== Sources ==
- Balakin, Sergey (2007). Легендарные "семёрки" Эсминцы "сталинской" серии [Legendary Sevens: Stalin's destroyer series] (in Russian). Moscow: Yauza/Eksmo. ISBN 978-5-699-23784-5.
- Berezhnoy, Sergey (2002). Крейсера и миноносцы. Справочник [Guide to Cruisers and Destroyers] (in Russian). Moscow: Voenizdat. ISBN 5-203-01780-8.
- Budzbon, Przemysaw (1980). "Soviet Union". In Chesneau, Roger (ed.). Conway's All the World's Fighting Ships 1922–1946. Greenwich, UK: Conway Maritime Press. pp. 318–346. ISBN 0-85177-146-7.
- Hill, Alexander (2018). Soviet Destroyers of World War II. New Vanguard. Vol. 256. Oxford, UK: Osprey Publishing. ISBN 978-1-4728-2256-7.
- Platonov, Andrey V. (2002). Энциклопедия советских надводных кораблей 1941–1945 [Encyclopedia of Soviet Surface Ships 1941–1945] (in Russian). Saint Petersburg: Poligon. ISBN 5-89173-178-9.
- Rohwer, Jürgen & Monakov, Mikhail S. (2001). Stalin's Ocean-Going Fleet. London: Frank Cass. ISBN 0-7146-4895-7.
- Rohwer, Jürgen (2005). Chronology of the War at Sea 1939–1945: The Naval History of World War Two (Third Revised ed.). Annapolis, Maryland: Naval Institute Press. ISBN 1-59114-119-2.
- Yakubov, Vladimir & Worth, Richard (2008). "The Soviet Project 7/7U Destroyers". In Jordan, John & Dent, Stephen (eds.). Warship 2008. London: Conway. pp. 99–114. ISBN 978-1-84486-062-3.
