= Leningrad-class destroyer =

Soviet naval class (1936–1964)

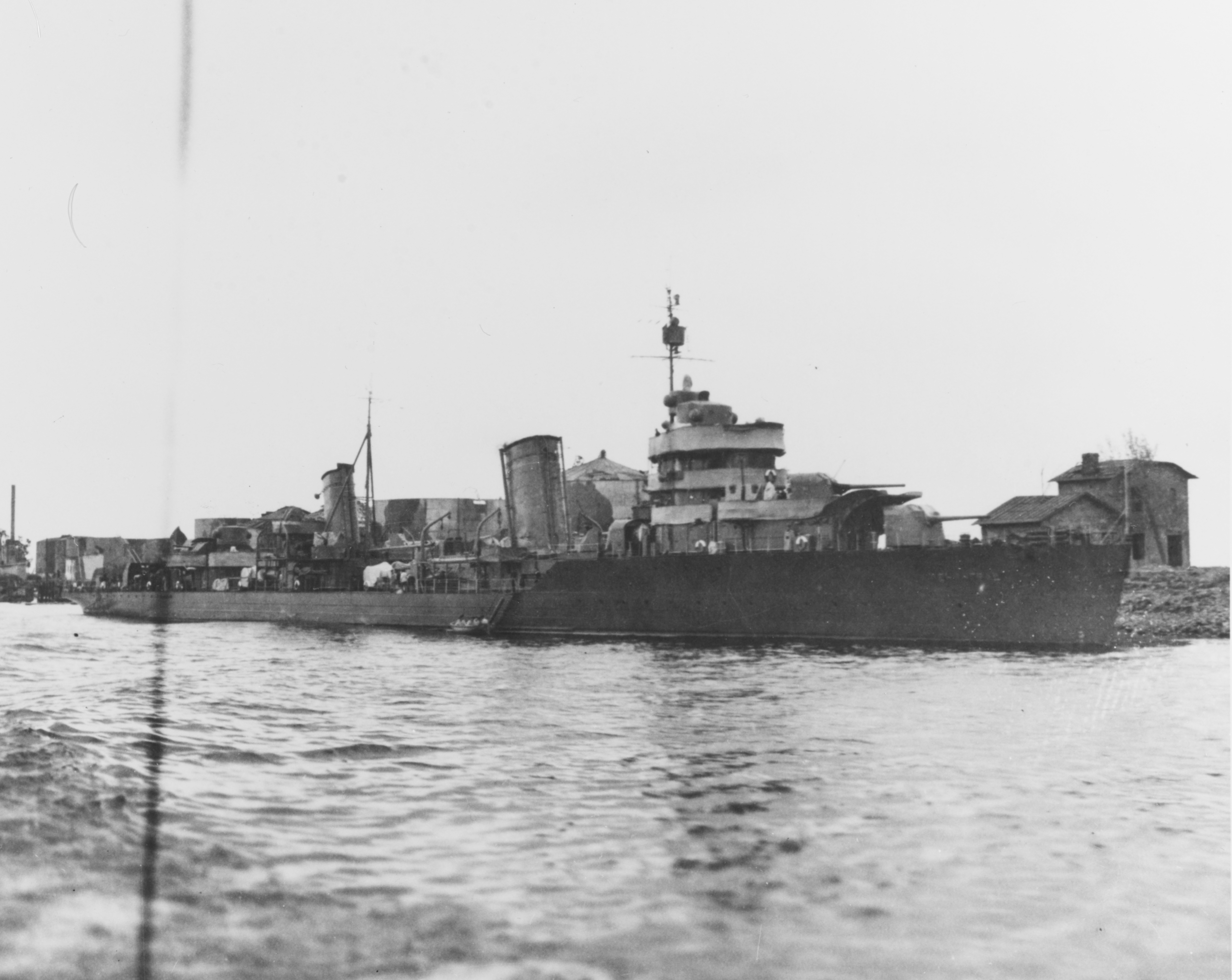
- Unknown Leningrad-class destroyer in Leningrad, June 1944

Class overview
- Builders: Shipyard No.190 (Zhdanov); Shipyard No.198 (Marti); Shipyard No.199; Shipyard No.202
- Operators: Soviet Navy
- Succeeded by: Tashkent class
- Subclasses: Project 1, Project 38
- Built: 1932–1940
- In service: 1936–1964
- In commission: 1936–1958?
- Completed: 6
- Lost: 2
- Scrapped: 4

General characteristics (Project 38)
- Type: Destroyer leader
- Displacement: 2,350 long tons (2,390 t) (standard); 2,680 long tons (2,720 t) (full load)
- Length: 127.5 m (418 ft 4 in) (o/a)
- Beam: 11.7 m (38 ft 5 in)
- Draft: 4.06 m (13 ft 4 in)
- Installed power: 3 water-tube boilers; 66,000 shp (49,000 kW)
- Propulsion: 3 shafts; 3 geared steam turbines
- Speed: 40 knots (74 km/h; 46 mph)
- Range: 2,100 nmi (3,900 km; 2,400 mi) at 20 knots (37 km/h; 23 mph)
- Complement: 250 (311 wartime)
- Sensors & processing systems: Arktur hydrophones
- Armament: 5 × single 130 mm (5.1 in) guns; 2 × single 76.2 mm (3 in) AA guns; 2 × single 45 mm (1.8 in) AA guns; 2 × quadruple 533 mm (21 in) torpedo tubes; 68–115 mines; 52 depth charges

The six Leningrad-class destroyer leaders were built for the Soviet Navy in the late 1930s. They were inspired by the contre-torpilleurs built for the French Navy. They were ordered in two batches of three ships each; the first group was designated Project 1 and the second Project 38. These ships were the first large vessels designed and built by the Soviets after the October Revolution of 1917.

The two sister ships deployed in the Baltic Sea, Leningrad and Minsk, bombarded Finnish coast defense positions during the Winter War of 1939–1940. During Operation Barbarossa they provided fire support during the German siege of Tallinn and escorted the convoys when it was evacuated at the end of August 1941. Again they provided fire support during the Siege of Leningrad as they were blockaded in Leningrad and Kronstadt by Axis minefields. Minsk was sunk by German air attack in September 1941, but was later raised and recommissioned. Neither ship did anything notable after the siege was lifted in January 1944. Moskva had a very short career in the Black Sea Fleet as she was sunk on 26 June 1941. Kharkov participated in most of the battles on the Black Sea coast, but was sunk by Stukas in October 1943 as she returned from a bombardment mission. Baku began the war in the Pacific, but was transferred to the Soviet Northern Fleet via the Northern Sea Route between 15 July and 14 October 1942, where she spent the rest of the war escorting Arctic convoys and attempting to intercept German convoys to their ports on the Arctic Ocean. Tbilisi had little to do until after the Soviet invasion of Manchuria when she transported naval infantry.

Not much is known of the details of their post-war careers. Most underwent a lengthy modernization in the early 1950s before being relegated to roles as training or target ships in the late 1950s. They were scrapped or expended as targets in the early 1960s.

== Design ==
Ordered under the First Five-Year Plan, the three Project 1 destroyer leaders were intended to lead flotillas of destroyers in combat. Rather than copy the British concept of a slightly enlarged version of the standard destroyer like HMS Codrington was for the A-class destroyers, the Soviets chose to copy the French contre-torpilleurs like the Vauquelin class, a series of very large and very fast destroyers that were not intended to cooperate with other, slower destroyers. When the Leningrads were being designed the only destroyers in service for them to lead were old ex-Tsarist ones that were only capable of 30 knots (56 km/h; 35 mph), but the Leningrad-class ships were designed for 40 knots (74 km/h; 46 mph). They were the largest ships built thus far from the keel up by Soviet shipbuilders and were plagued with delays and design issues as the Soviets overestimated their ability to construct ships of their size, having only previously built the Uragan-class guard ships, only one-third the size of the Leningrads. The three Project 38 ships were ordered under the Second Five-Year Plan and were slightly larger than their Project 1 half-sisters, but otherwise identical.

=== General characteristics ===
The three Project 1 ships were 127.5 m (418 ft) long overall. They had a beam of 11.7 m (38 ft) and a maximum forward draft of 4.06 m (13.3 ft) and a rear draft of 3.76 m (12.3 ft). They displaced 2,150 long tons (2,180 t) at standard load, and 2,582 long tons (2,623 t) at full load. The Project 38 ships displaced 2,350 long tons (2,390 t) at standard load, and 2,680 long tons (2,720 t) fully laden; between 100–200 long tons (100–200 t) more than their half-sisters. The Leningrads had a metacentric height of 1.22 m (4.0 ft). Their massive bridge structure made them both top-heavy and poor seaboats because of the concentration of weight forward. The ships pitched heavily at the bow, even after the addition of ballast forward, so much so that it interfered with firing the guns in bad weather. The hull structure was too weak to allow all of the guns to be fired at the same time. At high speeds they were hard to steer and vibrated heavily.

=== Armament and sensors ===
As a result of experience in the First World War, these ships were designed to use five of the new 130 mm (5.1 in) 50-caliber B-13 guns then under development in single mounts. One superfiring pair was forward and another aft of the superstructure while the fifth gun was mounted between the bridge and the forward funnel. It was intended as a replacement for the Tsarist-era 55-caliber gun, but with a shorter barrel more suited for use in destroyers. More propellant was used in the B-13 to duplicate the ballistics of the older weapon, but this caused severe erosion problems with the barrel. Determining the solution proved to be a long and difficult process and the first guns weren't delivered until 1936, three years after the Project 1 ships were launched. The guns could be depressed to −5° and elevated to a maximum of +45°. They fired 33.5-kilogram (74 lb) projectiles at a muzzle velocity of 870 m/s (2,900 ft/s) which gave them a range of about 25,500 m (27,900 yd). Their rate of fire was 6–10 rounds per minute.

A pair of 76.2 mm (3 in) 34-K anti-aircraft (AA) guns were mounted on the rear deckhouse in single mounts. Manually worked, they had an elevation range of −5° to +85°. Their muzzle velocity of 813 m/s (2,670 ft/s) gave their 6.61-kilogram (14.6 lb) time-fuzed shrapnel shells a maximum range of 8,600 m (9,400 yd). Their rate of fire was about 15–20 rounds per minute. Light AA guns initially consisted of two semi-automatic 45 mm (1.8 in) 21-K AA guns mounted on either side of the bridge. These had been adapted from the 45 mm anti-tank gun M1937 (53-K) and consequently lacked time-fuzed ammunition, which meant that only a direct hit would detonate the rounds. On the surviving ships these were supplemented during the war by six to ten fully automatic 37 mm (1.5 in) 70-K AA guns and two to eight DK 12.7 mm (0.50 in) machine guns. Some ships landed their middle 130 mm gun in exchange for more light AA guns. Photographic evidence shows that some ships received Lend-Lease, water-cooled 0.5 in (12.7 mm) Browning M2 AA machine guns.

They were the first Soviet ships to mount quadruple torpedo tubes, one 533 mm (21.0 in) launcher between the funnels and the other aft of the rear funnel. Sources disagree if any reload torpedoes were carried. The Leningrads were given a square stern with ramps to facilitate minelaying. They could carry 68 Model KB, 84 Model 1926 or 115 Model 1912 mines. Although no sonar was initially fitted, just the Arktur hydrophone system that was useless at speeds above three knots, they carried 20 B-1 and 32 Model 1931 depth charges. At some point during the war Baku, Minsk, Leningrad and Tbilisi were fitted with British Lend-Lease ASDIC (sonar), Type 285 fire control radars and American SG air search radars.

=== Propulsion ===
The Leningrads had three shafts, each driving one propeller, which necessitated laying out the boilers and turbines on the "unit" principle which had the advantage that a single hit couldn't disable all of the boilers or engines and immobilize the ship. Two boiler rooms, each with one three-drum boiler, were sited beneath the forward funnel. Immediately aft of them were two machinery rooms, each with one 22,000-shaft-horsepower (16,000 kW) geared steam turbine for the two outer shafts. The third boiler room was near the rear funnel and its turbine room was just aft, powering the central shaft. Designed to reach 40 knots (74 km/h; 46 mph), the ships easily exceeded that with Leningrad reaching 43 knots (80 km/h; 49 mph) during her sea trials on 5 November 1936. 210 long tons (210 t) of fuel oil were normally carried, but this could be increased to 600 long tons (610 t) at full load. This gave the Leningrad-class ships a range of 2,100 nautical miles (3,900 km) at 20 knots (37 km/h; 23 mph).

== Construction ==
Building times for these ships was absurdly long, not least due to mismanagement. Many delays were caused by the armament and the turbines, neither of which was ready for production when Leningrad was laid down. The new turbines entered production after the Leningrad was launched, but the new guns did not even enter production until three years after that. Additional problems were caused by the large numbers of defective parts, some items reaching a 90% rejection rate. Unusually for Soviet ships of the interwar period, the Leningrads were not overweight.

Both Baku and Tbilisi were assembled at Komsomolsk-on-Amur from parts provided by the shipyard at Nikolayev.

== Ships ==
All ships were named after cities.

Construction data
| Ship | Builder | Laid down | Launched | Commissioned | Fate |
Project 1
| Leningrad | Shipyard No. 190 (Zhdanov), Leningrad | 5 November 1932 | 17 November 1933 | 5 December 1936 | Sunk as a target, May 1963 |
| Kharkov | Shipyard No. 198 (Marti South), Nikolayev | 19 October 1932 | 9 September 1934 | 19 November 1938 | Sunk by aircraft, 6 October 1943 |
| Moskva | Shipyard No. 198 (Marti South), Nikolayev | 29 October 1932 | 1934 | 10 August 1938 | Sunk on 26 June 1941, most likely by Romanian mines |
Project 38
| Minsk | Shipyard No. 190 (Zhdanov), Leningrad | 5 October 1934 | 6 November 1935 | 15 February 1939 | Sunk by aircraft, 23 September 1941. Salvaged, and sunk as a target, 1958 |
| Baku | Shipyard No. 198 (Marti South), Nikolayev, and Shipyard No. 199, Komsomolsk-on-Amur (laid down), Shipyard No. 202 (Dalzavod), Vladivostok (completed) | 15 January 1935 (relaid 10 March 1936) | 25 July 1938 | 27 December 1939 | Scrapped, 30 July 1963 |
| Tbilisi | Shipyard No. 198 (Marti South), Nikolayev, and Shipyard No. 199, Komsomolsk-on-Amur (laid down), Shipyard No. 199 (completed) | 15 January 1935 | 24 July 1939 | 11 December 1940 | Scrapped, 31 January 1964 |

== Service history ==
=== World War II ===
==== Baltic Fleet ====
Leningrad was commissioned into the Baltic Fleet in December 1936, but one source claims that she was still being worked on until July 1938. Minsk was commissioned in early 1939. She sailed to Tallinn on 22 October 1940 when the Soviet Union began to occupy Estonia. After the Winter War broke out both ships bombarded Finnish coastal defense positions on Saarenpää Island, part of the Beryozovye Islands on 10 December 1939 and again on 30 December–3 January 1940. In addition Minsk bombarded them on 18–19 December as well. The beginning of Operation Barbarossa found Leningrad and Minsk in Tallinn and they were ordered to cover mine-laying operations at the entrance to the Gulf of Finland between Hanko and Osmussaar on 23 June. Both ships bombarded German positions surrounding Tallinn 23–27 August and participated in the evacuation of Tallinn from Tallinn to Leningrad at the end of August 1941. Minsk was sunk in Kronstadt harbor by Junkers Ju 87 dive-bombers of StG 2 on 23 September. She was later salvaged and recommissioned on 22 June 1943. Leningrad was part of the third evacuation convoy from Hanko to Leningrad from 9–12 December, but was forced to turn back by damage from nearby mine explosions. For most of the rest of the war both destroyers were blockaded in Leningrad and Kronstadt by Axis minefields and could only provide gunfire support for the defenders during the Siege of Leningrad.

==== Black Sea Fleet ====
Moskva was commissioned in 1938 and twice made port visits in Turkey before Operation Barbarossa began on 22 June 1941. Both Moskva and Kharkov bombarded the Romanian port of Constanţa with a total of 350 rounds on 26 June, but Moskva was sunk. Between 16 and 19 June, the Romanian minelayers Amiral Murgescu, Regele Carol I and Aurora laid a barrage of 1,000 mines near the port of Constanţa, (although other causes have been suggested: shells from the Romanian destroyer Regina Maria and the German 28 cm (11 in) coast defense battery Tirpitz, or an accidental friendly fire torpedo attack by the Soviet submarine Shch-206.)

Kharkov was repaired by 18 July and covered the retreat of the Danube Flotilla to Odessa during the next several days. She bombarded Axis positions a number of times during the Siege of Odessa as well as escorting the evacuation convoys from Odessa to Sevastopol in October. During the Siege of Sevastopol she provided gunfire support and evacuated cut-off troops from elsewhere in the Crimea into Sevastopol and brought in reinforcements from Caucasian ports. She helped to transport the 388th Rifle Division from Novorossisk and Tuapse to Sevastopol between 7–13 December, the 79th Naval Rifle Brigade on 19–20 December and the 354th Rifle Division between 21 and 22 December, bombarding German positions in the interim. Between February and July 1942 she bombarded German troops on multiple times and brought in reinforcements and supplies for Sevastopol, evacuating wounded and refugees as she returned to port. She bombarded Axis positions near Feodosiya on 2–3 August and provided fire support for the defenders of Novorossiysk on 1–4 September. Between 8–11 September she ferried the 137th and 145th Rifle Regiments along with the 3rd Naval Rifle Brigade from Poti to Tuapse and Gelendzhik and a month later she transported 12,600 men of the 8th, 9th and 10th Guards Infantry Brigades from Poti to Tuapse to reinforce the defenses there between 20 and 23 October. On 29 November 1942 she escorted the cruiser Voroshilov on a mission to bombard Axis positions on Feodonisi and bombarded Yalta during the night of 19–20 December. On the night of 4 February 1943 the Soviets made a series of amphibious landings to the west of Novorossiysk, behind German lines. Kharkov, two cruisers, and two other destroyers provided fire support for the main landing, but the Soviet troops there were wiped out by 6 February, although one secondary landing was successful. She bombarded German positions near Novorossiysk again on the night of 21–22 February. Anapa was bombarded on the night of 13–14 May and Feodosiya on 22–23 May. During the night of 5–6 October 1943 Kharkov and the destroyers Besposhchadny and Sposobny bombarded Yalta, Alushta and Feodosiya and were spotted on their return voyage and attacked by Stukas of III./StG 3. Kharkov was damaged by their first attack and had to be towed by Sposobny. The second attack damaged all three ships and Sposobny took Besposhchadny under tow as well. The next attack sank both Kharkov and Besposhchadny. Sposobny was sunk by the fourth wave while trying to rescue survivors. This incident prompted Stalin to issue an order forbidding the use of ships destroyer-sized and larger without his express permission.

==== Pacific Fleet ====
Baku began the war in the Pacific, but was transferred to the Soviet Northern Fleet via the Northern Sea Route between 15 July and 14 October 1942, where she spent the rest of the war escorting Arctic convoys, attempting to intercept German convoys en route to their ports on the Arctic Ocean and providing gunfire support for Soviet operations. Tbilisi had little to do until the Soviet invasion of Manchuria when she transported elements of the 358th Naval Rifle Battalion to the Korean port of Rason on 12 August 1945.

=== Postwar ===
Little is known of their post-war careers, other than that most underwent a lengthy modernization in the early 1950s. Minsk wasn't modernized, but rather redesignated as a training ship in 1951 and assigned to the Dzerzhinsky Higher Naval Engineering College. By the late 1950s most were being converted to target ships and other auxiliary roles before being scrapped or expended as targets in the early 1960s.
