= Danube Flotilla (Soviet Union) =

Soviet Union naval unit (1940–1960)

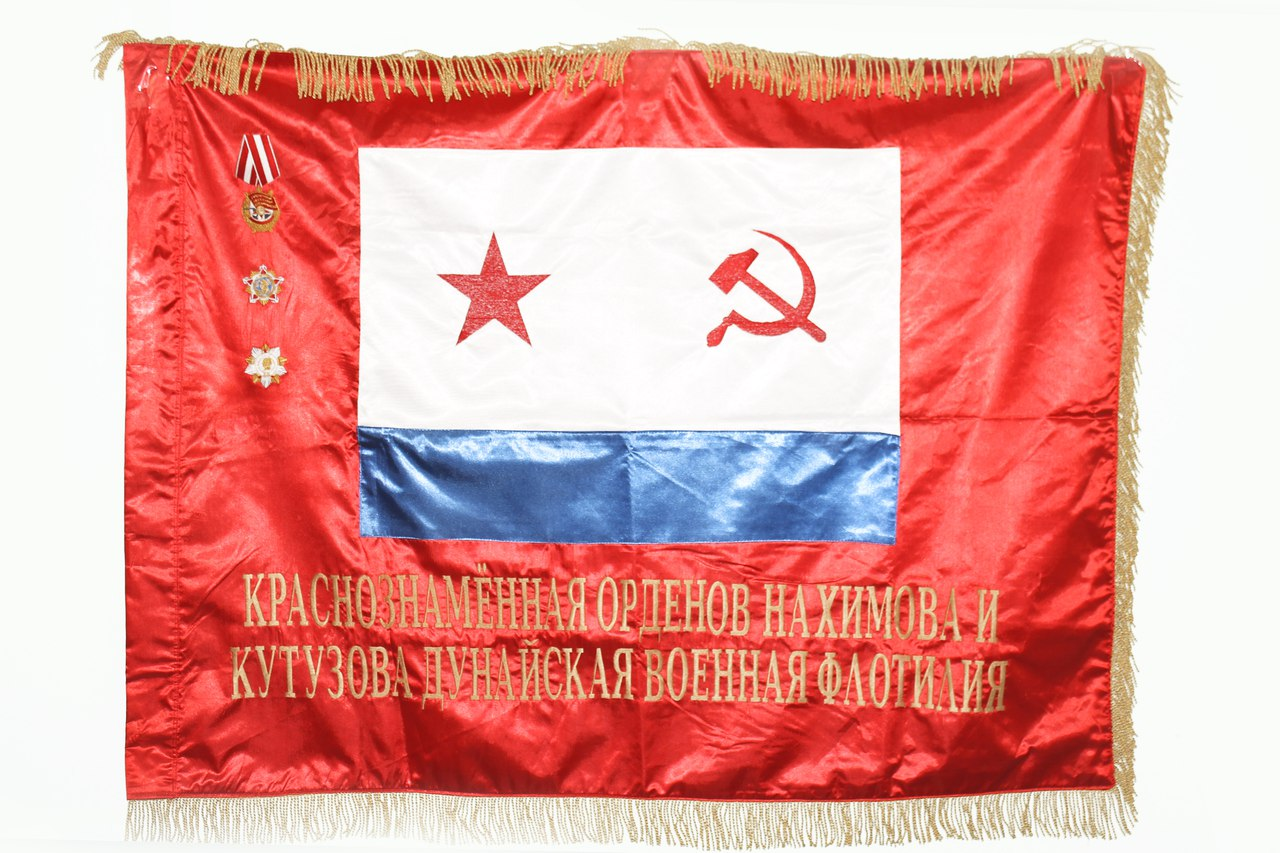
Banner of the Danube Military Flotilla

The Danube Flotilla was a naval force of the Soviet Navy's Black Sea Fleet during World War II (in Russia, called the Great Patriotic War) and afterwards, existing 1940–1941 and 1944–1960. The Flotilla operated on the Danube River and also, at times, on other rivers connected to the Black Sea.

== 1940 flotilla ==
The Soviet occupation of Bessarabia and Northern Bukovina in 1940 gave the Soviet Union a border on the Danube, so the first Danube Flotilla was constituted to help defend this border. It was based in Izmail and was formed of ships transferred from the Dnieper Flotilla. The new Danube Flotilla initially consisted of five monitors (armed with 102mm and 130mm guns), twenty two armored boats, five transports, and four launches, supported by an anti-aircraft battalion, fighter squadron, a naval infantry company, a machine gun company, and several shore batteries (two 152mm, one 130mm, one 75mm, and one 45mm gun batteries). Upon the start of the war the flotilla was reinforced by an additional another one shore battery (122mm A-19), in exchange for the transfer of the four launches to the Black Sea Fleet.

At the beginning of the Romanian–German invasion of the Soviet Union on 22 June 1941, the Flotilla cooperated with Red Army troops in the defense of the southern front. On 24–25 June 1941, the Flotilla participated in a counterattack crossing of the Danube onto the Romanian side. After this, the Flotilla supported troops trapped in bridgeheads, and as the Red Army withdrew to Odessa the Flotilla ferried troops across the Southern Bug and Dnieper Rivers.

The Flotilla was disbanded on 21 November 1941.

== 1944 flotilla ==
As the Red Army cleared Crimea and the Dniester River of German troops, the Danube Flotilla was re-constituted on the Dniester in April 1944 to assist further offensives.

The flotilla assisted the Red Army in operations including the clearing of the Dniester Estuary and the clearing of the Danube Delta, including both troop-carrying and gunfire support for landings at Prymorske and Vylkove on 23–24 August 1944, and at Kiliya on 25 August.

As the Red Army moved upriver, the Danube Flotilla followed and participated in the Belgrade Offensive, the Budapest Offensive, and the Vienna Offensive. Flotilla operations included assisting in landings at Raduevats and Prahovo on 29–30 September 1944 (even well into the 21st century, the wrecks of about 200 vessels sunk by the Germans to block the landings remain in the Danube at Prahovo), at Smederevo on 16 October, at Vukovar on 8–10 December, at Gerjen on 30 November - 1 December, at Esztergom on 19–23 March 1945, and at Radwanska on 28–30 March.

On 13 April 1945, as the Battle of Vienna was ending, the Flotilla landed troops in a surprise stroke at both ends of the Imperial Bridge in Vienna. This enabled the Red Army to cut the demolition cables and seize the bridge intact.

For its combat exploits, the 1st Guards Armored Boat Detachment (an element of the Danube Flotilla) was awarded the Order of Kutuzov 2nd Class. The Danube Flotilla was disbanded in 1960.

== Flotilla Commanders ==
1940 Flotilla

- Rear Admiral Nikolai Osipovich Abramov (July 1940 — September 1941) (Abramov went on to become an early commander of the postwar Polish Navy)
- Rear Admiral Alexander Frolov (September 1940 — November 1941) (Frolov went on to become Chief of Staff of the Pacific Fleet during the short war against Japan)

1944 Flotilla

- Vice Admiral Sergey Gorshkov (April 1944 — December 1944) (Gorshkov went on to become Commander in Chief of the Soviet Navy)
- Vice Admiral Georgy Kholostyakov (December 1944 — 1948) (Kholostjakov went on to become Commander of the Soviet 7th Fleet)
- Rear Admiral Serafim Chusin (1958 — 1951) (Chusin went on to become commander of the Black Sea Fleet)
- Vice Admiral Vasily Tsipanovich (1952 – 1955)
- Rear Admiral Alexander Uragan (1955 – 1956)
- Rear Admiral Nikolai Bochkov (1956 – 1960)

== Order of battle (June 1941) ==
In June 1941, the Flotilla consisted of five river monitors (the Udarny, Martynov, Rostovtsev, Zheleznyakov, and Žemčužin), 22 armored boats the BK type 1125, 7 trawlers, 6 poluglisserovs (very small patrol boats with a two-man crew), a minelayer (the Kolkhoznik (Collective Farm Worker)), a floating workshop (the DM–10), a hospital ship (the Soviet Bukovina), a sidewheeler tug, and 12 other assorted boats.

At this time, the standard armored boat in production, and forming part of the strength of the Danube Flotilla, was the BK type, which featured (depending on model) one (1125 class) or two (1124 class) tank turrets with 76.2-millimetre (3.00 in) guns as main armament. The monitors were more powerful, though slower. The Udarny, a typical monitor, had two 130-millimetre (5.1 in) guns (as well as four 4 45mm guns).

Attached to the Flotilla were the 96th Fighter Squadron, the 46th Independent Anti-Aircraft Artillery Battalion, the 17th Machine Gun Company, and an морской пехоты (Naval Infantry) company.

At the beginning of hostilities, six batteries of coastal artillery on the Danube were attached to the Flotilla, and a Maritime Border Guard Division of the NKVD with 30 boats was under the operational control of the Flotilla.
