= Soviet destroyer Boyevoy (1950) =

Skory-class destroyer

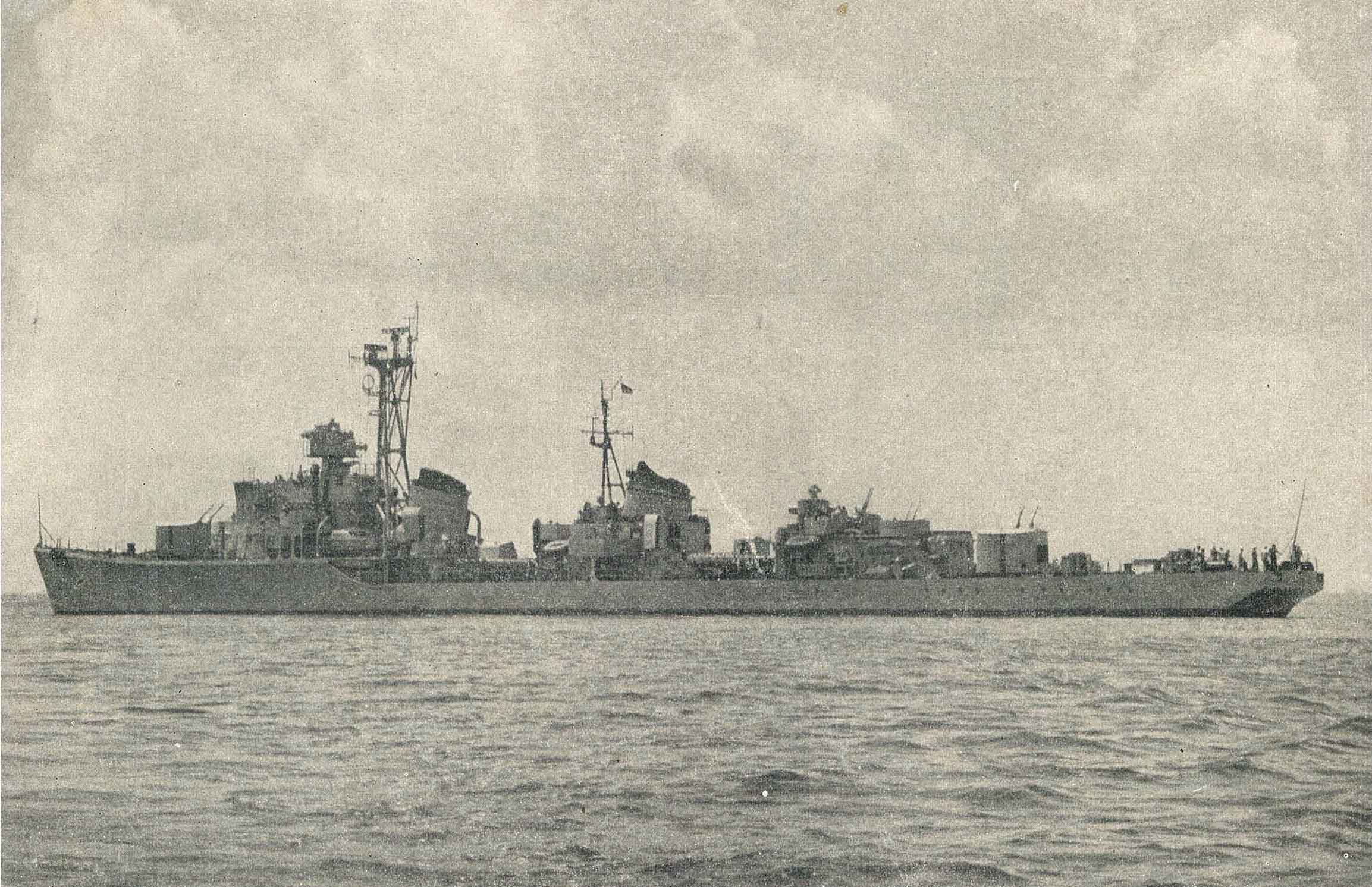
- A Skory-class destroyer of Indonesian Navy c. 1960s

History

Soviet Union
- Name: Boyevoy; (Боевой)
- Namesake: Militant in Russian
- Builder: Mykolayiv Shipyard
- Laid down: 21 December 1949
- Launched: 29 April 1950
- Commissioned: 19 December 1950
- Decommissioned: 25 November 1964
- Renamed: CL-27

Indonesia
- Name: Sultan Darmuda
- Namesake: Sultan Darmuda
- Commissioned: 1964
- Decommissioned: 1973
- Identification: Pennant number: 305

General characteristics
- Class & type: Skory-class destroyer
- Displacement: 2,316 long tons (2,353 t) standard; 3,066 long tons (3,115 t) full load
- Length: 120.5 m (395 ft 4 in)
- Beam: 12 m (39 ft 4 in)
- Draught: 3.9 m (12 ft 10 in)
- Propulsion: 3 × boilers 60,000 shp (44,742 kW); 2 × shafts
- Speed: 36.5 knots (67.6 km/h; 42.0 mph)
- Range: 4,080 nautical miles (7,556 km; 4,695 mi) at 16 kn (30 km/h; 18 mph)
- Complement: 286
- Sensors & processing systems: Radars: Gyus-1; Ryf-1; Redan-2; Vympel-2; Sonar: Tamir-5h
- Armament: as built: 2 × dual 130 mm (5.1 in) guns; 1 × dual 85 mm (3.3 in) guns; 7 × single 37 mm (1.5 in) guns; 2 × quin 533 mm (21 in) torpedo tubes; 60 × mines; 52 × depth charges; as modernized: 2 × dual 130 mm (5.1 in) guns; 2 × quin RBU 2500 anti-submarine rockets; 1 × dual 85 mm (3.3 in) guns; 7 × single 57 mm guns; 1 × quin 533 mm (21 in) torpedo tubes; 60 × mines or; 52 × depth charges

Boyevoy was a Skory-class destroyer of the Soviet Navy which later transferred to the Indonesian Navy and renamed RI Sultan Darmuda (305).

== Development ==
The development of the first post-war destroyer project based on the previous project 30 was entrusted to the TsKB-17 team. The composition of the armament was finally specified on November 28, 1945. The technical design materials and working drawings were developed under the leadership of the chief designer A. L. Fisher (deputies G. D. Agul, K. A. Maslennikov) in the new, recreated, TsKB-53. The technical design was approved by the Decree of the Council of Ministers of the USSR No. 149-95 of January 28, 1947.

== Construction and career ==
The ship was built at Mykolayiv Shipyard in Nikolaev and was launched on 29 April 1950 and commissioned into the Black Sea Fleet on 19 December 1950.

On 31 August 1961, she was renamed to CL-27.

She was decommissioned on 25 November 1964 and sold to the Indonesian Navy. She was renamed RI Sultan Darmuda (305).

She was again retired from service in 1973.
