= Soviet destroyer Sposobny =

Sposobny (Russian: Способный; lit. "capable"; alternate spellings Sposobnyy, and Sposobnyi) can refer to a number of Soviet warships:

- Soviet destroyer Sposobny (1940), a Soviet Navy Soobrazitelnyy-class destroyer
- Soviet destroyer Sposobny (1950), a Soviet Navy Skoryy-class destroyer
- Soviet destroyer Sposobny (1970), a Soviet Navy Kashin-class destroyer
