= Soviet destroyer Skory =

Skory (Russian: Скорый; lit. "rapid" or "fast"; alternate spellings Skoryy, and Skoriy) can refer to a number of Soviet destroyers:

- Soviet destroyer Skory (1939), a Storozhevoy-class destroyer completed on 18 July 1941.
- Soviet destroyer Skory (1949), a Skory-class destroyer launched on 14 August 1949, transferred to Poland in 1958 as ORP Wicher (1958).
- Soviet destroyer Skory (1971), a Kashin-class destroyer commissioned on 23 September 1972.

== See also ==
- Skory-class destroyer, the first destroyer class built for the Soviet Navy after World War II.
