= Soviet destroyer Volevoy =

Volevoy is the name of the following ships of the Soviet Navy:

- Soviet destroyer Volevoy (1947), a Matsu-class destroyer acquired from Japan (ex-Hatsuzakura), renamed in 1949, stricken in 1959
- Soviet destroyer Volevoy (1951), a Skory-class destroyer sold to Indonesia in 1959, decommissioned in 1971, scrapped in 1973
