= Soviet destroyer Pylkiy =

Pylkiy (Russian: Пылкий; lit. "ardent"; alternate spellings Pylky) can refer to a number of Soviet destroyers:

- Soviet destroyer Pylkiy (1945), a Soviet Navy Type 1934A-class destroyer, former German destroyer Z15 Erich Steinbrinck. She was acquired in 1945 and broken up in 1958.
- Soviet destroyer Pylkiy (1952) a Skoryy-class destroyer. She was launched in 1952 and decommissioned in 1964. Transferred to Indonesian Navy as KRI Diponegoro (306).
