= Soviet destroyer Vyrazitelny =

Vyrazitelny is the name of the following ships of the Soviet Navy:

- Soviet destroyer Vyrazitelny (1947), a Matsu-class destroyer acquired from Japan (ex-Hatsuzakura), renamed in 1949, stricken in 1958
- Soviet destroyer Vyrazitelny (1951), a Skory-class destroyer sold to Indonesia in 1962, scrapped in 1971
