= Soviet destroyer Vnezapny =

Vnezapny is the name of the following ships of the Soviet Navy:

- Soviet destroyer Vnezapny (1947), a Akizuki-class destroyer acquired from Japan (ex-Harutsuki), renamed Oskol in 1949, stricken in 1969
- Soviet destroyer Vnezapny (1951), a Skory-class destroyer sold to Indonesia in 1959, decommissioned in 1971
