= Soviet destroyer Tashkent =

Destroyer of the Soviet Navy

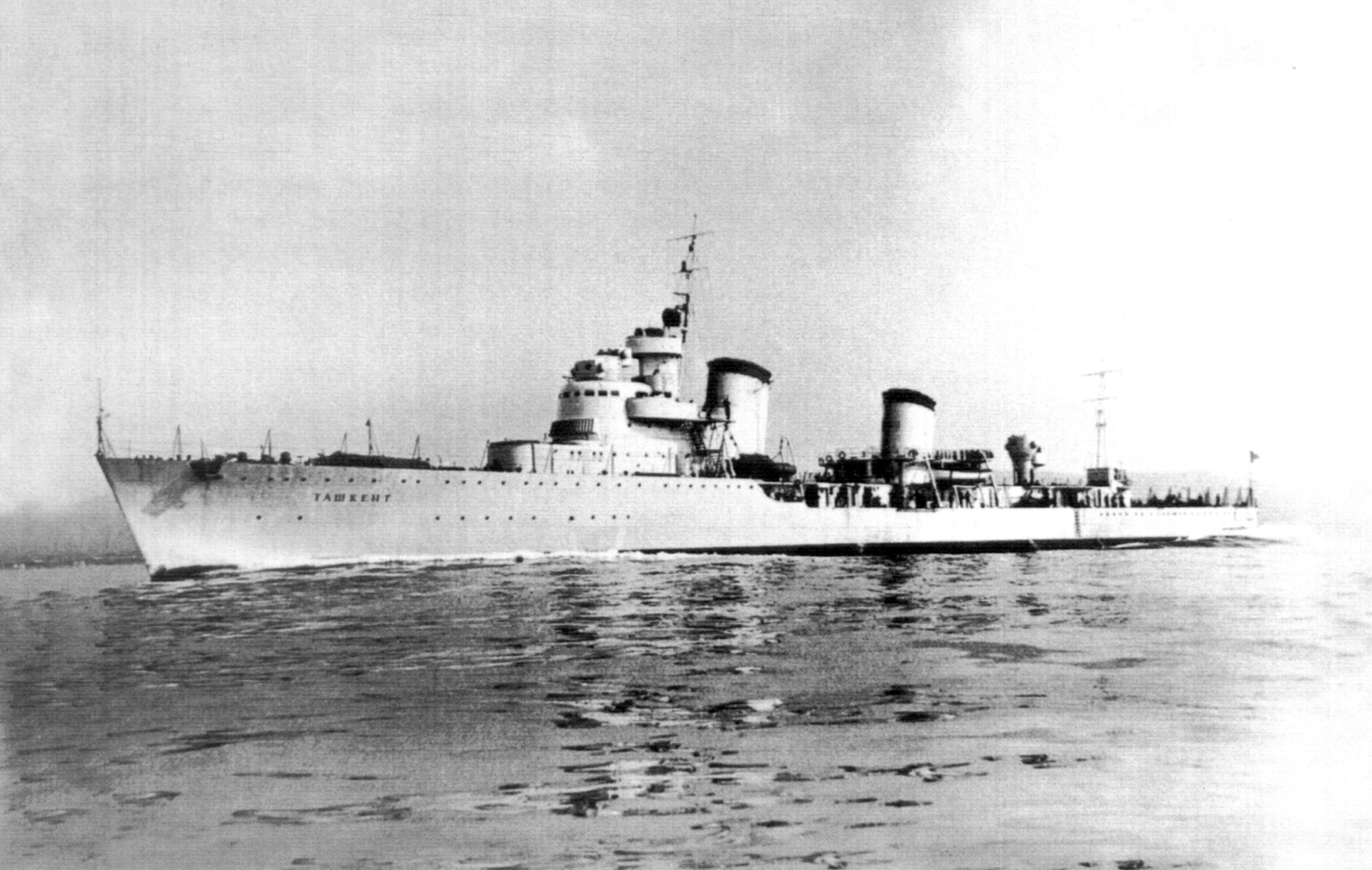
- Tashkent on her builder's sea trials, 1937

History

Soviet Union
- Name: Tashkent (Ташкент)
- Namesake: Tashkent
- Ordered: 2nd Five-Year Plan
- Awarded: September 1935
- Builder: OTO, Livorno, Italy
- Laid down: 11 January 1937
- Launched: 28 December 1938
- Completed: 22 October 1939
- Nickname(s): "Blue Beauty" or "Blue Cruiser"
- Fate: Sunk by aircraft, 2 July 1942

General characteristics (September 1941)
- Class & type: Tashkent-class destroyer leader
- Displacement: 2,840 long tons (2,890 t) (standard)
- Length: 139.7 m (458 ft 4 in) (o/a)
- Beam: 13.7 m (44 ft 11 in)
- Draft: 3.7 m (12 ft 2 in)
- Installed power: 2 Yarrow boilers; 100,000 shp (75,000 kW)
- Propulsion: 2 shafts; 2 geared steam turbines
- Speed: 42.5 knots (78.7 km/h; 48.9 mph)
- Range: 5,030 nmi (9,320 km; 5,790 mi) at 20 knots (37 km/h; 23 mph)
- Complement: 250
- Armament: 3 × twin 130 mm (5.1 in) guns; 1 × twin 76 mm (3 in) AA guns; 6 × single 37 mm (1.5 in) AA guns; 6 × single 12.7 mm (0.5 in) machine guns; 3 × triple 533 mm (21 in) torpedo tubes; 76 mines; 24 depth charges, 2 × depth charge throwers, 1 × rack

Tashkent (Russian: Ташкент) was the lead ship of her class of destroyer leaders (officially known as Project 20), built in Italy for the Soviet Navy just before World War II. The problems of the previous Leningrad-class destroyer leaders demonstrated that Russian design experience had atrophied in the years since the Russian Revolution of 1917, and the Soviets contracted for design assistance from Fascist Italy in the mid-1930s. Delivered without any armament in 1939, Tashkent was given a temporary gunnery outfit when she entered service with the Black Sea Fleet later that year. She had her permanent armament installed shortly before the Axis powers invaded the Soviet Union in mid-1941.

During the Siege of Odessa the ship escorted a transport to Odessa and provided naval gunfire support before she was badly damaged by Axis bombers in August. After repairs were completed in November, Tashkent ferried reinforcements and supplies, evacuated wounded and refugees, and bombarded Axis positions during the Siege of Sevastopol in 1941–1942. The last ship to enter Sevastopol harbor in June before the city surrendered, she was crippled by Axis bombers on her return voyage to Novorossiysk and was sunk a few days later during an air strike on the harbor there. Her wreck was refloated in 1944, but it was a constructive total loss and was scrapped after the war.

== Design and description ==
Unsatisfied with the structural weaknesses and construction problems with Leningrad-class destroyer leader, the Soviets decided that they needed foreign design assistance around 1934–1935. They requested designs for a high-speed destroyer leader from three Italian shipbuilders and accepted the submission by Odero-Terni-Orlando (OTO) in September 1935 as part of the Second Five-Year Plan. The Italian firm would build Tashkent in its own shipyard and provide assistance for the Soviets to build others in their own shipyards.

The Tashkent-class ships had an overall length of 139.7 meters (458 ft 4 in), a beam of 13.7 meters (44 ft 11 in), and a mean draft of 3.7 meters (12 ft 2 in). The ships displaced 2,840 long tons (2,890 t) at standard load and 4,163 long tons (4,230 t) at deep load. Their crew numbered 250 officers and sailors. They were powered by a pair of geared steam turbines, each driving one propeller shaft using steam from a pair of Yarrow boilers. Designed to produce 100,000 shaft horsepower (75,000 kW), the turbines were intended to give the Tashkents a maximum speed of 42.5 knots (78.7 km/h; 48.9 mph). Tashkent herself reached 43.5 knots (80.6 km/h; 50.1 mph) from 125,500 shp (93,600 kW) during her sea trials in 1938, although her armament had yet to be fitted. The ship reached 42.7 knots (79.1 km/h; 49.1 mph) once her armament had been installed. The ships carried enough fuel oil to give them a range of 5,030 nautical miles (9,320 km; 5,790 mi) at 20 knots (37 km/h; 23 mph).

The main armament of the Tashkent class was intended to consist of six 130-millimeter (5.1 in) B-13 guns in three twin-gun B-2LM turrets, one superfiring pair forward of the superstructure and the other mount aft of it. The turrets were not ready in time for Tashkent so three single mounts were substituted for them once she arrived in the USSR. The designed anti-aircraft suite consisted of four semi-automatic 45-millimeter (1.8 in) 21-K anti-aircraft (AA) guns in single mounts, but six weapons were actually installed, all situated on a platform around the aft funnel, and six 12.7-millimeter (0.50 in) DShK machine guns in single mounts. She was fitted with nine 533-millimeter (21 in) torpedo tubes in three rotating triple mounts amidships. The Tashkents could also carry 76 mines and 24 depth charges which were delivered by two throwers and one stern rack.

=== Modifications ===
During a brief refit in February 1941, the three B-2LM turrets were fitted. At the same time the 45 mm guns were replaced by an equal number of fully automatic 37-millimeter (1.5 in) 70-K AA guns. A twin-gun 39-K mount for 76.2-millimeter (3 in) 34-K AA guns was installed on the stern while she was under repair on 31 August; it had been originally intended for the destroyer Ognevoy which was still under construction.

== Construction and career ==
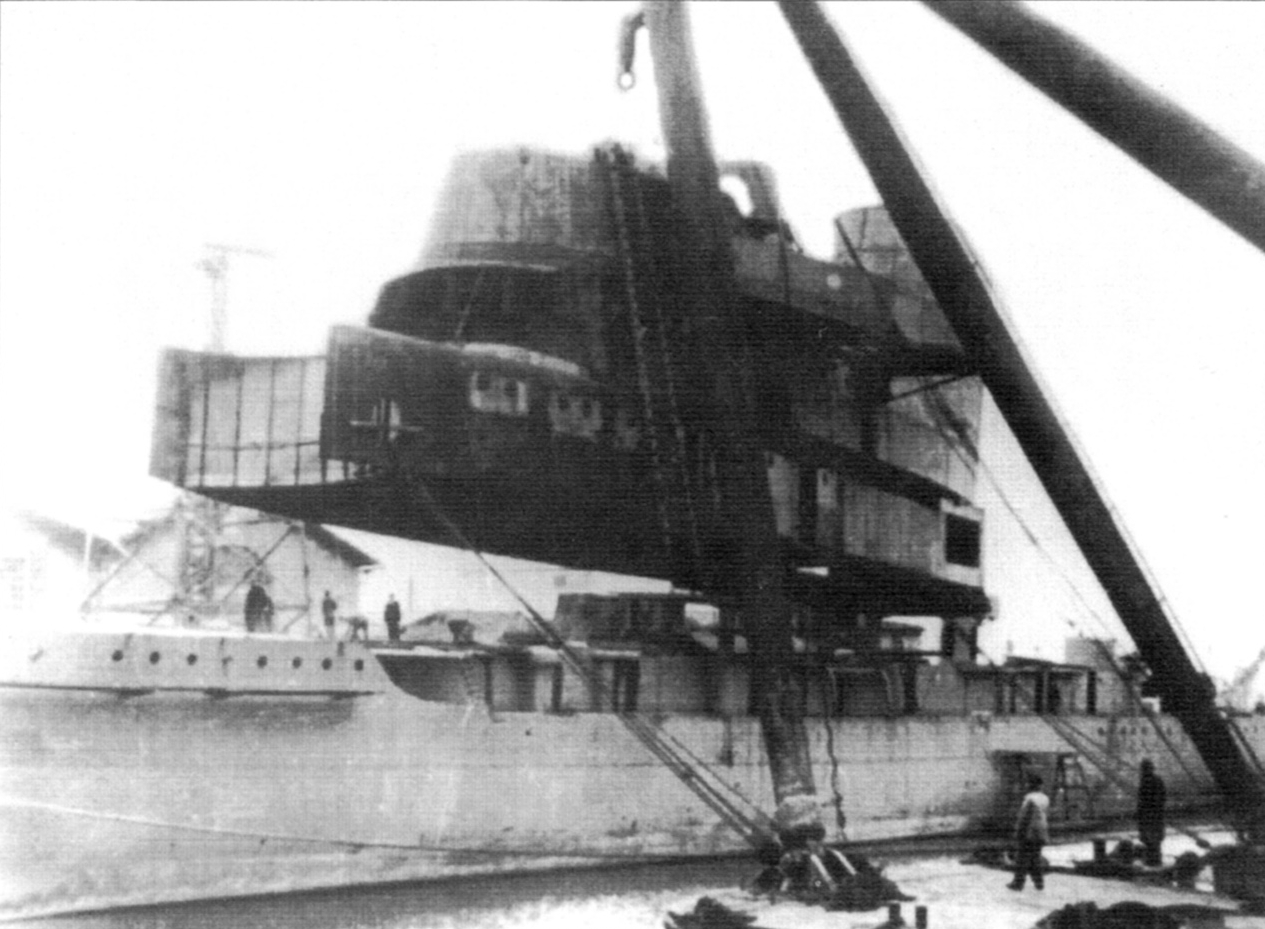
Tashkent's forward superstructure being swayed aboard, 1937

Tashkent, named after the capital of the Uzbek Soviet Socialist Republic, was laid down on 11 January 1937 by OTO at their Livorno shipyard. The ship was launched on 28 December and turned over to the Soviets on 6 May 1939 in Odessa. Because OTO painted her in the blue-gray color used by the Royal Italian Navy, she was nicknamed "Blue Beauty" and "Blue Cruiser" by sailors. She was assigned to the Black Sea Fleet on 22 October 1940 and was refitting in Nikolayev when the Germans invaded the USSR on 22 June 1941. Tashkent was transferred to Sevastopol on 10 July, being unsuccessfully attacked by aircraft twice en route, to conduct her post-refit sea trials. Problems with her propulsion machinery delayed her combat debut for another month. On 19 August she bombarded Axis positions with 127 shells from her main guns and she unsuccessfully searched for Axis transports two days later. On 28 August the ship helped to escort the transport MS Abkhazia from Sevastopol to Odessa. Tashkent remained in the area afterwards and provided naval gunfire support to Soviet troops near Odessa over the next three days. On the last of those days, 30 August, she was badly damaged by near-misses from three Axis bombers that knocked out her hydraulic power, punched a 5-by-5-meter (16 ft × 16 ft) hole in her hull, damaged one of her propeller shafts and distorted the forecastle girders. The shockwaves from the bombs killed two crewmen, injured seven others and one man went missing. Although she was escorted by the destroyer Smyshleny as a precaution, Tashkent was able to sail back to Sevastopol under her own power where she was dry docked for repairs that lasted until 1 November.

That day she sailed to Poti, Georgia, one of the new bases for the Black Sea Fleet as approaching German forces had made Sevastopol too dangerous to use. On 19 November the ship transported a cargo of ammunition to Sevastopol and bombarded Axis positions outside the city as she departed with 145 shells two nights later. Kontr-admiral (Rear Admiral) Lev Vladimirsky hoisted his flag aboard Tashkent on 25 November as commander of a convoy of ships bound for the Soviet Far East that consisted of three oil tankers and an icebreaker. Vladimirisky and his ships escorted the convoy as far as the Bosporus in very heavy weather before returning home. On 22 December, Tashkent took another load of ammunition to Sevastopol and remained there for the next five days, firing 1,037 shells in support of the defenders.

On 1 January 1942, the ship helped to transport elements of the 386th Rifle Division to Sevastopol and she remained there for the next few days, firing 176 main-gun shells in support of the defenders. On 7 and 8 January, she attempted to land reinforcements at Eupatoria during a Soviet counterattack, but was driven off by heavy German fire and bad weather, although she bombarded German defenses on the latter day with 79 shells from her 130 mm guns. After returning to Sevastopol, Tashkent escorted a pair of transports back to the Caucasus ports on the 15th. Two weeks later, she ferried replacements to Sevastopol and fired 79 shells at German positions on 30 and 31 January before departing on 1 February. The ship delivered 914 replacements to Sevastopol two days later. On 4 February Tashkent began focusing solely on bombarding Axis defenses; firing over three hundred 130 mm shells before resuming her transport duties on 29 April with the delivery of more replacements to Sevastpol. On 10 May the ship, together with the destroyer leader Kharkov, arrived in Feodosia Bay to bombard targets, but could not identify any and returned to base without firing. A week later she delivered 689 replacements and 50 metric tons (49 long tons) of ammunition, following that with 775 men and 65 metric tons (64 long tons) of ammunition on 22 May. On her return voyage, she carried 39 soldiers, 86 evacuees, 21 torpedoes and the contents of the state bank. On 24 May Tashkent ferried 983 soldiers and 100 metric tons (98 long tons) of ammunition to Sevastopol and made further trips with the same types of cargo on 28 May, and 2, 6, and 23 June. The following day, the destroyer leader was the last ship to arrive in Sevastopol, landing 1,142 men, supplies and equipment of the 142nd Rifle Brigade after evading attacks by Heinkel He 111H bombers of I. Gruppe (First Group) of Kampfgeschwader 100 (Bomber Wing 100) en route.

After having loaded 2,100 wounded and part of the Siege of Sevastopol Panorama, Tashkent departed for Novorossiysk, but was attacked by numerous bombers on 27 June that failed to hit the ship directly. The shockwaves and fragments from the numerous near-misses, however, holed the hull multiple times, damaged her steering, flooded the forward boiler room and caused her to take on about 1,000 metric tons (980 long tons) of water. Three crewmen and 56 of her passengers were killed and 10 crewmen and 5 passengers were wounded. Her crew claimed to have shot down at least two of her attackers. A flotilla of ships sortied from Novorossiysk to assist her; the destroyer Soobrazitelny took off 1,975 of her passengers while the destroyer Bditelny towed her to Novorossiysk. The salvage ship Jupiter, the tugboat Chernomor and about 30 smaller ships also rendered assistance. Novorossiysk was attacked by Junkers Ju 88A bombers of I. Gruppe of Kampfgeschwader 76 (Bomber Wing 76) and elements of I./KG 100 on 2 July; hitting Tashkent and Bditelny each with a pair of bombs and sinking both ships as well as Chernomor. The Soviets stripped her wreck of useful equipment and parts, transferring a pair of B-2LM mounts and the 34-K mount to Ognevoy and the third B-2LM turret to Osmotritelny. When they assessed her wreck in 1943 they found that the boiler and turbine compartments had been destroyed by the bombs, her hull plating, decks, superstructure, and five transverse bulkheads were damaged and her keel was broken. Salvage operations began on 13 January 1944 although it was not until 30 August when the wreck was refloated and beached on a sandbar in the harbor. Deciding that it would not be economical to repair the ship, the navy left the wreck there until 1946 when it was towed to Nikolayev to be scrapped.

== Bibliography ==
- Bergström, Christer & Mikhailov, Andrey (2001). Black Cross/Red Star: The Air War Over the Eastern Front. Vol. 2: Resurgence, January – June 1942. Pacifica, California: Pacifica Military History. ISBN 0-935553-51-7.
- Budzbon, Przemysław (1980). "Soviet Union". In Chesneau, Roger (ed.). Conway's All the World's Fighting Ships 1922–1946. Greenwich, UK: Conway Maritime Press. pp. 318–346. ISBN 0-85177-146-7.
- Budzbon, Przemysław; Radziemski, Jan & Twardowski, Marek (2022). Warships of the Soviet Fleets 1939–1945. Vol. I: Major Combatants. Annapolis, Maryland: Naval Institute Press. ISBN 978-1-68247-877-6.
- Hill, Alexander (2018). Soviet Destroyers of World War II. New Vanguard. Vol. 256. Oxford, UK: Osprey Publishing. ISBN 978-1-4728-2256-7.
- Platonov, Andrey V. (2002). Энциклопедия советских надводных кораблей 1941–1945 [Encyclopedia of Soviet Surface Ships 1941–1945] (in Russian). Saint Petersburg: Poligon. ISBN 5-89173-178-9.
- Rohwer, Jürgen (2005). Chronology of the War at Sea 1939–1945: The Naval History of World War Two (Third Revised ed.). Annapolis, Maryland: Naval Institute Press. ISBN 1-59114-119-2.
- Rohwer, Jürgen & Monakov, Mikhail S. (2001). Stalin's Ocean-Going Fleet: Soviet Naval Strategy and Shipbuilding Programs 1935–1953. London: Frank Cass. ISBN 0-7146-4895-7.
- Wright, Christopher C. (1994). "The Fate of the Tashkent". Warship International. XXXI (4): 348–360. ISSN 0043-0374.
