= Soviet destroyer Vyrazitelny (1951) =

Skory-class destroyer

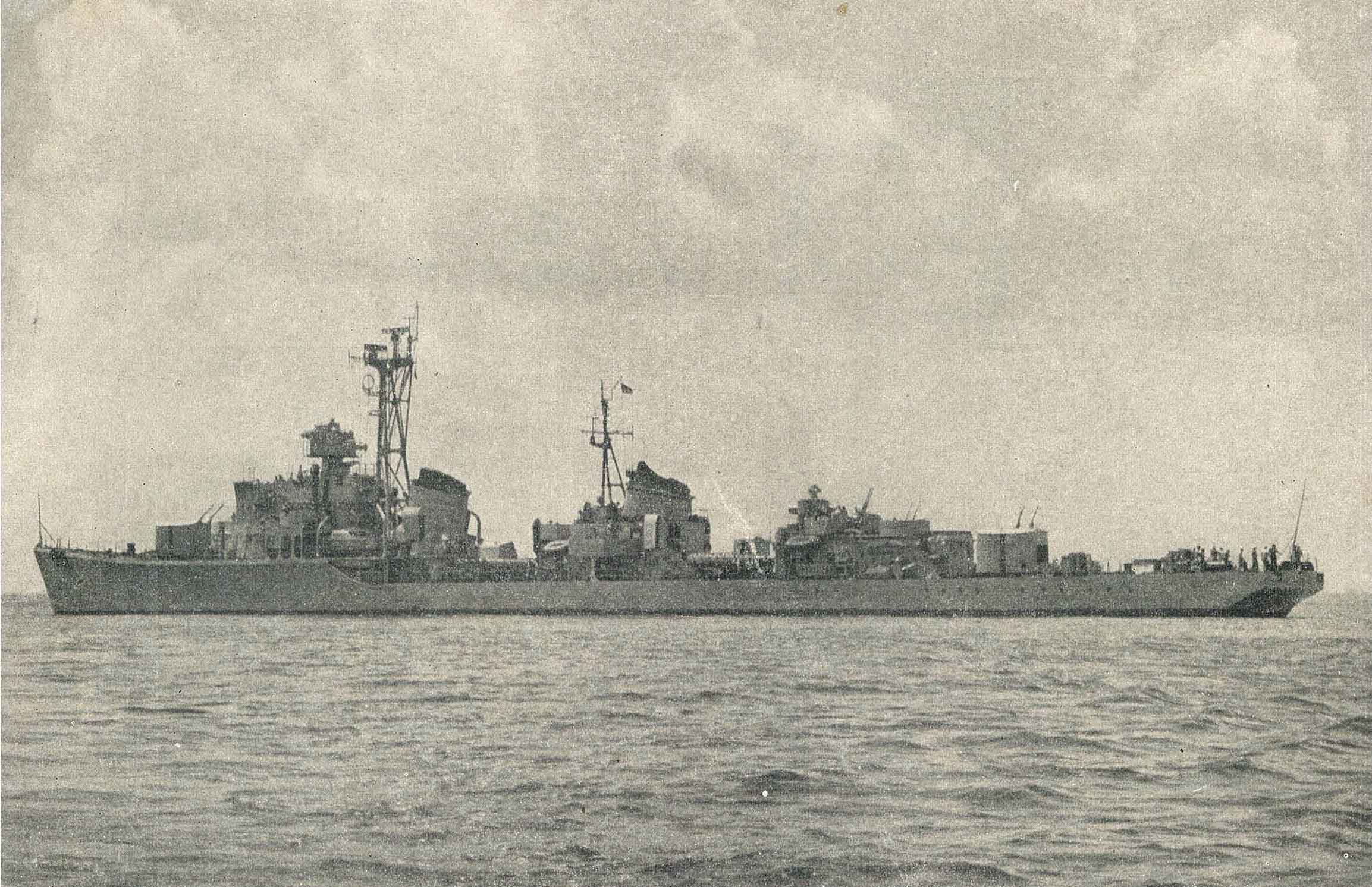
- A Skory-class destroyer of Indonesian Navy c. 1960s

History

Soviet Union
- Name: Vyrazitelny; (Выразительный)
- Namesake: Expressive in Russian
- Builder: Amur Shipbuilding Plant
- Laid down: 14 December 1950
- Launched: 26 August 1951
- Commissioned: 29 December 1951
- Decommissioned: 22 November 1962

Indonesia
- Name: Singamangaradja
- Namesake: Sisingamangaraja XII
- Commissioned: 1962
- Decommissioned: 1971
- Identification: Pennant number: 202, 302

General characteristics
- Class & type: Skory-class destroyer
- Displacement: 2,316 long tons (2,353 t) standard; 3,066 long tons (3,115 t) full load
- Length: 120.5 m (395 ft 4 in)
- Beam: 12 m (39 ft 4 in)
- Draught: 3.9 m (12 ft 10 in)
- Propulsion: 3 × boilers 60,000 shp (44,742 kW); 2 × shafts
- Speed: 36.5 knots (67.6 km/h; 42.0 mph)
- Range: 4,080 nautical miles (7,556 km; 4,695 mi) at 16 kn (30 km/h; 18 mph)
- Complement: 286
- Sensors & processing systems: Radars: Gyus-1; Ryf-1; Redan-2; Vympel-2; Sonar: Tamir-5h
- Armament: as built: 2 × dual 130 mm (5.1 in) guns; 1 × dual 85 mm (3.3 in) guns; 7 × single 37 mm (1.5 in) guns; 2 × quin 533 mm (21 in) torpedo tubes; 60 × mines; 52 × depth charges; as modernized: 2 × dual 130 mm (5.1 in) guns; 2 × quin RBU 2500 anti-submarine rockets; 1 × dual 85 mm (3.3 in) guns; 7 × single 57 mm guns; 1 × quin 533 mm (21 in) torpedo tubes; 60 × mines or; 52 × depth charges

Vyrazitelny was a Skory-class destroyer of the Soviet Navy which later transferred to the Indonesian Navy and renamed RI Singamangaradja (202).

== Development ==
The development of the first post-war destroyer project based on the previous project 30 was entrusted to the TsKB-17 team. The composition of the armament was finally specified on November 28, 1945. The technical design materials and working drawings were developed under the leadership of the chief designer A. L. Fisher (deputies G. D. Agul, K. A. Maslennikov) in the new, recreated, TsKB-53. The technical design was approved by the Decree of the Council of Ministers of the USSR No. 149-95 of January 28, 1947.

The lead ship of this project was accepted into the USSR Navy on December 21, 1949, on the occasion of J.V. Stalin's birthday. Engineer-Lieutenant Colonel A.T.

== Construction and career ==
The ship was built at Amur Shipbuilding Plant in Komsomolsk-on-Amur and was launched on 26 August 1951 and commissioned into the Pacific Fleet on 29 December 1951.

She was decommissioned on 22 November 1962 and sold to the Indonesian Navy. She was renamed RI Singamangaradja, with the pennant number 202. In 1963 it was reported that her pennant number had changed to 302. She was reduced to reserve in 1969, and sold for scrap in 1971.
