= ORP Grom (1957) =

Coordinates: 54°36′48″N 18°46′42″E

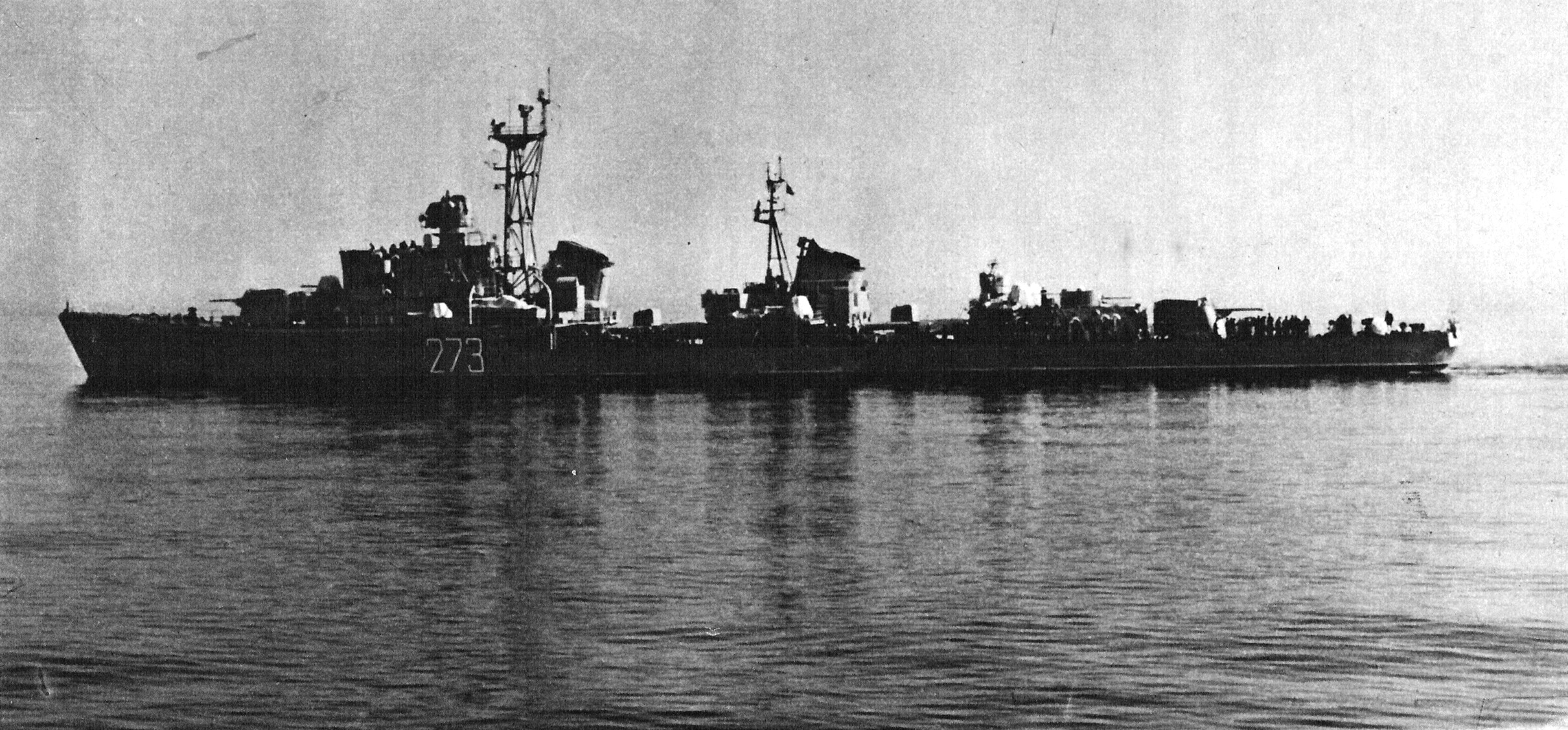

History

PRL
- Name: ORP Grom
- Builder: Zhdanov Shipyard, Leningrad
- Yard number: 606
- Laid down: 1 March 1950
- Launched: 30 April 1950
- Acquired: from USSR, 15 December 1957
- Decommissioned: 1973
- Fate: Scrapped; remainings sunk in Hel as breakwater

General characteristics
- Class & type: Project 30bis destroyer
- Displacement: 2,316 long tons (2,353 t) standard, 3,066 long tons (3,115 t) full load
- Length: 120.5 m (395 ft 4 in)
- Beam: 12 m (39 ft 4 in)
- Draught: 3.9 m (12 ft 10 in)
- Propulsion: 2 shaft geared turbines, 3 boilers, 60,000 shp (45,000 kW)
- Speed: 36.5 knots (67.6 km/h; 42.0 mph)
- Range: 4,080 nautical miles (7,560 km; 4,700 mi) at 16 kn (30 km/h; 18 mph)
- Complement: 286
- Armament: 2 × 130 mm (5.1 in) B13 guns in a B-2LM turret; 1 × twin 85 mm (3.3 in) AA gun; 7 × single 37 mm (1.5 in) AA guns; 2 × quintuple 533 mm (21 in) torpedo tubes; 60 mines or 52 depth charges

ORP Grom (English: Thunder) was a Project 30bis destroyer, sold to the People's Republic of Poland by the Soviet Union in 1957. She was built by the Zhdanov Shipyard in Leningrad and originally served in the Soviet Baltic Fleet as the Sposobnyy. She served together in the Polish Navy with her sister ship Wicher until 1973. The ship was scrapped in 1977. Her remainings together with the Wicher were sunk in Hel as breakwaters, where they remain to this day.
