= Tashkent-class destroyer =

Soviet destroyer (1940–42)

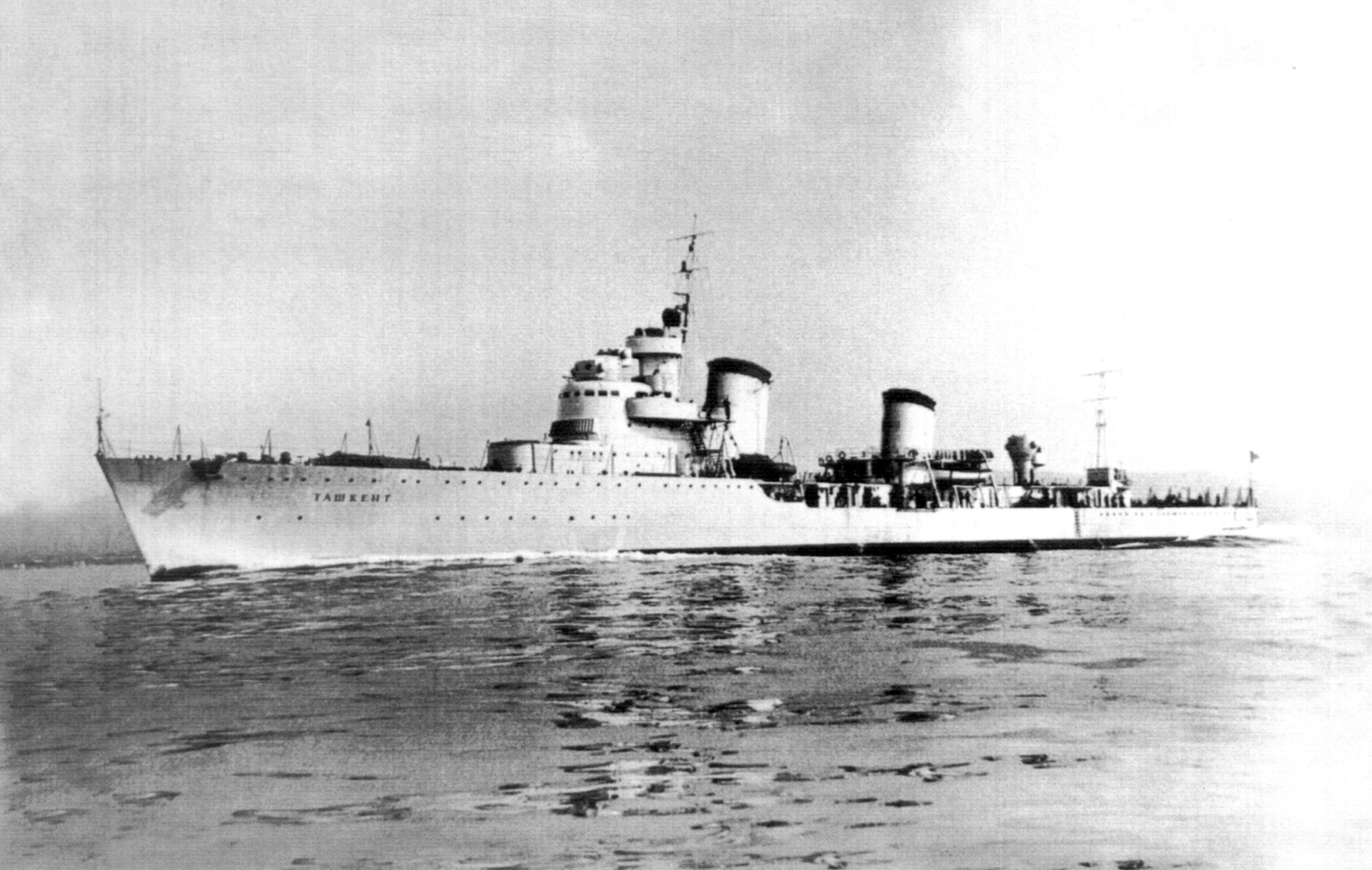
- Tashkent on her builder's sea trials, 1937

Class overview
- Name: Tashkent class
- Operators: Soviet Navy
- Preceded by: Leningrad class
- Succeeded by: Kiev class
- Built: 1937–1940
- In service: 1940–1942
- Planned: 4
- Completed: 1
- Canceled: 3
- Lost: 1

General characteristics (as designed)
- Type: Destroyer leader
- Displacement: 2,840 long tons (2,890 t) (standard)
- Length: 139.7 m (458 ft 4 in) (o/a)
- Beam: 13.7 m (44 ft 11 in)
- Draft: 3.7 m (12 ft 2 in)
- Installed power: 2 Yarrow boilers; 100,000 shp (75,000 kW)
- Propulsion: 2 shafts; 2 geared steam turbines
- Speed: 42.7 knots (79.1 km/h; 49.1 mph)
- Range: 5,030 nmi (9,320 km; 5,790 mi) at 20 knots (37 km/h; 23 mph)
- Complement: 250
- Armament: 3 × twin 130 mm (5.1 in) guns; 6 × single 45 mm (1.8 in) AA guns; 6 × single 12.7 mm (0.5 in) machine guns; 3 × triple 533 mm (21 in) torpedo tubes; 76 mines; 24 × depth charge, 2 depth charge throwers, 1 rack

The Tashkent class (officially known as Project 20) consisted of a single destroyer leader, built in Italy for the Soviet Navy just before World War II. Three others were ordered from shipyards in the Soviet Union, but they were cancelled before they were laid down as they were too difficult to build with the existing technology in Soviet shipyards. Completed in 1939, Tashkent participated in the Sieges of Odessa and Sevastopol in 1941–1942, during which she ferried reinforcements and supplies into those cities, evacuated wounded and refugees, and provided naval gunfire support for Soviet troops. The ship was badly damaged twice by Axis bombers before she was sunk in the harbor in mid-1942. Her wreck refloated in 1944, but it was too badly damaged to be worth repairing and was scrapped after the war.

== Design and description ==
Unsatisfied with the Leningrad-class destroyer leader, the Soviets decided that they needed foreign design assistance around 1934–1935. The French were not willing to share ship plans so the Soviets turned to Italy, based on their earlier experience with the Italians during the preliminary design work for the Kirov-class cruisers. They requested designs for a high-speed destroyer leader from three Italian shipbuilders and accepted the submission by Odero-Terni-Orlando (OTO) in September 1935. They would build the lead ship, named Tashkent, in their Livorno shipyard, and provide assistance for the Soviets to build others in their own shipyards. Three other ships were ordered, although the only ship to receive a name was Baku, before they were all cancelled due to difficulties with adapting the Italian design to Soviet shipbuilding practices. A total of eleven ships in the class were planned: three for the Baltic Fleet, two for the Black Sea Fleet, two for the Northern Fleet and four for the Pacific Fleet.

The Tashkent-class ships had an overall length of 139.7 meters (458 ft 4 in), a beam of 13.7 meters (44 ft 11 in), and a mean draft of 3.7 meters (12 ft 2 in). The ships displaced 2,840 long tons (2,890 t) at standard load, 3,200 long tons (3,300 t) at full load, and 4,163 long tons (4,230 t) at deep load. Their crew numbered 250 officers and sailors.

The ships had a pair of geared steam turbines, each driving one three-bladed propeller using steam from a pair of Yarrow boilers that operated at a pressure of 28 kg/cm^{2} (2,746 kPa; 398 psi) and a temperature of 340 °C (644 °F). The turbines, designed to produce 100,000 shaft horsepower (75,000 kW), were intended to give the Tashkents a maximum speed of 42.5 knots (78.7 km/h; 48.9 mph) and Tashkent herself reached 43.5 knots (80.6 km/h; 50.1 mph) from 130,000 shp (97,000 kW) during her sea trials in 1938, although her armament had yet to be fitted. She reached 42.7 knots (79.1 km/h; 49.1 mph) once her armament had been installed. The ships had a maximum capacity of 1,200 metric tons (1,181 long tons) of fuel oil which gave them a range of 5,030 nautical miles (9,320 km; 5,790 mi) at a speed of 20 knots (37 km/h; 23 mph). They were equipped with a pair of 120-kilowatt (160 hp) turbogenerators and three diesel generators, two of 75 kilowatts (101 hp) and one of 18 kilowatts (24 hp).

=== Armament and fire-control ===
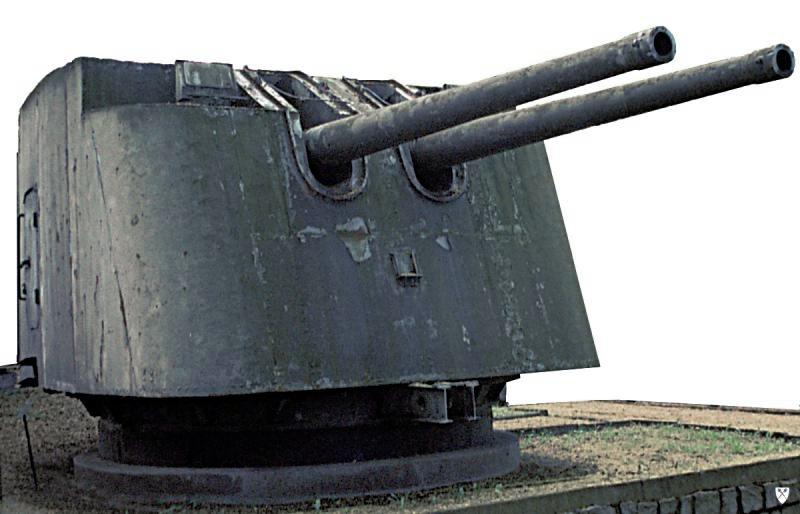
A B-2LM turret from the Polish destroyer Wicher

Tashkent's main armament was intended to consist of six 50-caliber 130-millimeter (5.1 in) B-13 guns in three twin-gun B-2LM turrets, one superfiring pair forward of the superstructure and the other mount aft of it. However, the turrets were not ready in time so three single mounts were substituted. The manually operated mounts had an elevation range between -5° and +45° and had a rate of fire of 6–10 rounds per minute. The B-13 gun fired a 33.4-kilogram (74 lb) shell at a muzzle velocity of 870 m/s (2,900 ft/s), which gave them a range of 25,597 meters (27,993 yd).

Anti-aircraft defense aboard Tashkent was designed to be provided by four 46-caliber semi-automatic 45-millimeter (1.8 in) 21-K AA guns in single mounts, but six weapons were actually installed, all of which were clustered around the aft funnel as well as six 12.7-millimeter (0.50 in) DShK machine guns. The 21-K had a rate of fire of 25–30 rounds per minute with an elevation range between -10° and +85°. The gun fired a 1.41-kilogram (3.1 lb) shell at a muzzle velocity of 2,500 ft/s (760 m/s). This gave them a range of 9,200 meters (10,100 yd). The DShK had an effective rate of fire of 125 rounds per minute and an effective range against aircraft of 2,500 meters (2,700 yd).

The Tashkents carried nine 533 mm (21 in) torpedo tubes in three rotating triple mounts amidships. The ships could also carry 76 mines and 24 depth charges which were delivered by two throwers and one stern rack.

Tashkent was equipped with a gunnery director on top of the bridge, fitted with a duplex rangefinder installation, that provided data for an Italian-made "Galileo" mechanical analog fire-control computer, and a 3-meter (9.8 ft) rangefinder. Two 1.5-meter (4 ft 11 in) rangefinders were provided for the AA guns. It is uncertain what fire-control systems would have been used by the Soviet-built ships had they not been canceled.

=== Modifications ===
During a brief refit in February 1941, the three B-2LM turrets were installed. At the same time the 45 mm guns were replaced by an equal number of fully automatic 37-millimeter (1.5 in) 70-K AA guns. The gun had a range of 4,000 meters (4,400 yd) from its 0.732-kilogram (1.61 lb) fragmentation shells that were fired at a muzzle velocity of 2,900 ft/s (880 m/s). They had a maximum elevation of +90° and a rate of fire of 160–180 rounds per minute.

A twin-gun 39-K mount for 76.2-millimeter (3 in) 34-K AA guns was fitted on her stern while Tashkent was under repair on 31 August; it had been originally intended for the destroyer Ognevoy-class destroyer Ognevoy which was still under construction. The 34-K guns could elevate between -5° and +85° and had a rate of fire of 15–20 rounds per minute. Their muzzle velocity of 801 meters per second (2,630 ft/s) gave their 26-pound (11.9 kg) high-explosive shells a maximum horizontal range of 14,640 meters (16,010 yd) and an effective ceiling of 6,500 meters (21,300 ft).

Original drawings by Odero-Terni-Orlando Shipyards, Livorno, 1936

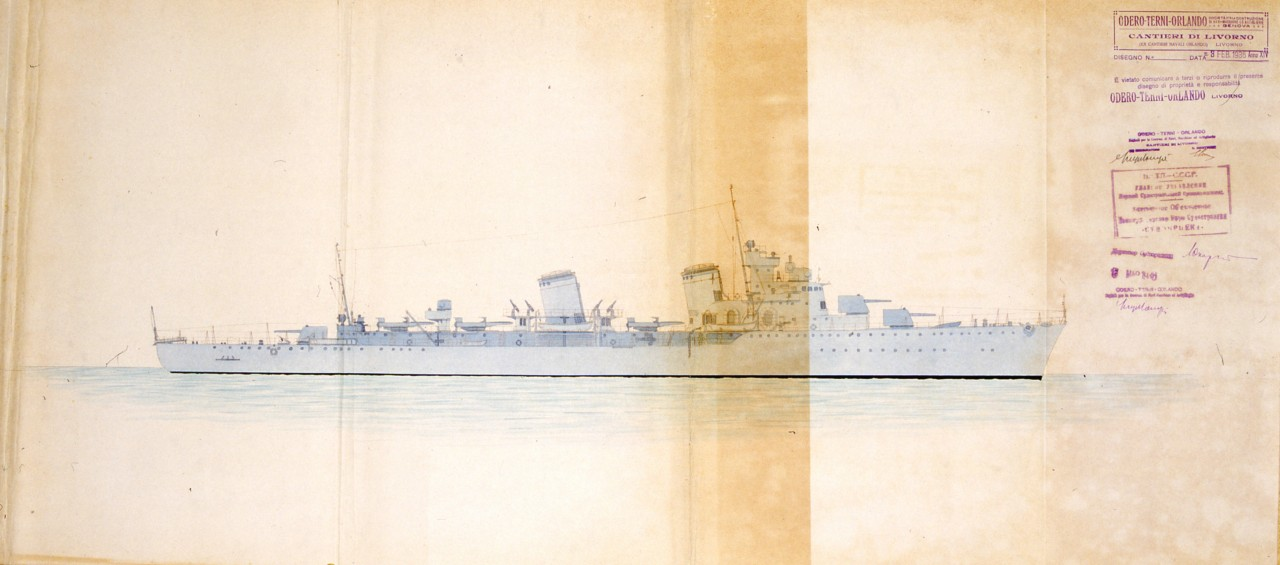
Right elevation

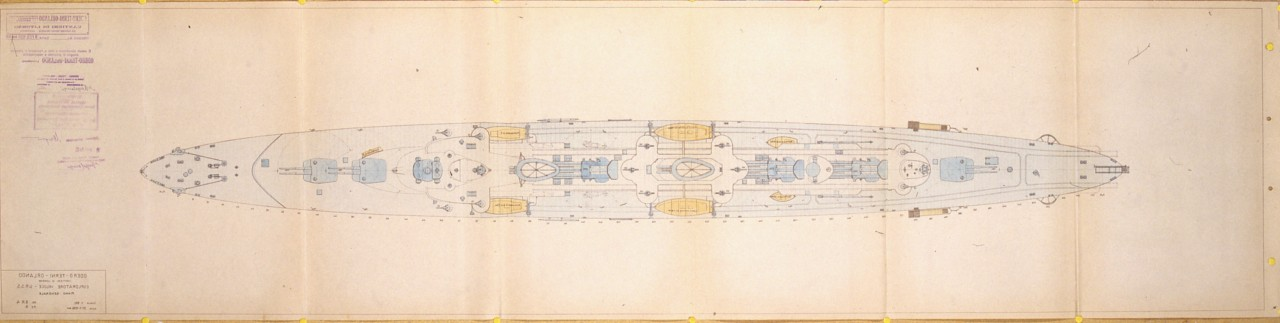
Plan

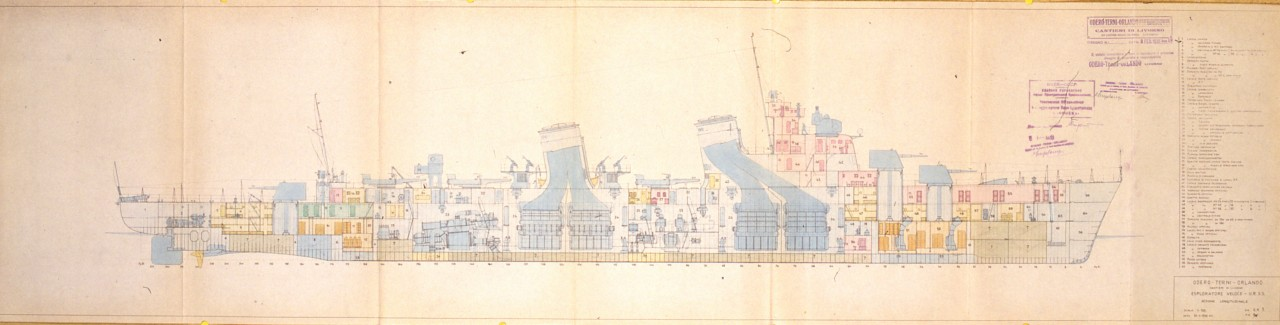
Longitudinal section

== Ships ==
Name	Builder	Laid down	Launched	Entered service	Fate
Tashkent	OTO, Livorno, Italy	11 January 1937	28 December 1937	22 October 1939	Sunk by aircraft, 2 July 1942
Baku (yard number 511)	Zavod No. 190 (Zhdanov), Leningrad	Cancelled, 1940			
Unnamed (yard number 512)	Zavod No. 190 (Zhdanov), Leningrad	Cancelled, 1940			
Unnamed	Marti South, Nikolayev	Cancelled, 1940			

== Service ==
During the Siege of Odessa, Tashkent escorted a transport to Odessa and provided naval gunfire support before she was badly damaged by Axis bombers in August. After repairs were completed in November, the ship ferried reinforcements and supplies, evacuated wounded and refugees, and bombarded Axis positions during the Siege of Sevastopol in 1941–1942. Tashkent was crippled by Axis bombers on a return voyage to Novorossiysk in late June and was sunk a few days later during an air strike on the harbor there. Her wreck was refloated in 1944, but it was a total constructive total loss and was scrapped after the war.

== Bibliography ==
- Budzbon, Przemysław (1980). "Soviet Union". In Chesneau, Roger (ed.). Conway's All the World's Fighting Ships 1922–1946. Greenwich, UK: Conway Maritime Press. pp. 318–346. ISBN 0-85177-146-7.
- Budzbon, Przemysław; Radziemski, Jan & Twardowski, Marek (2022). Warships of the Soviet Fleets 1939–1945. Vol. I: Major Combatants. Annapolis, Maryland: Naval Institute Press. ISBN 978-1-68247-877-6.
- Hill, Alexander (2018). Soviet Destroyers of World War II. New Vanguard. Vol. 256. Oxford, UK: Osprey Publishing. ISBN 978-1-4728-2256-7.
- Platonov, Andrey V. (2002). Энциклопедия советских надводных кораблей 1941–1945 [Encyclopedia of Soviet Surface Ships 1941–1945] (in Russian). Saint Petersburg: Poligon. ISBN 5-89173-178-9.
- Rohwer, Jürgen (2005). Chronology of the War at Sea 1939–1945: The Naval History of World War Two (Third Revised ed.). Annapolis, Maryland: Naval Institute Press. ISBN 1-59114-119-2.
- Rohwer, Jürgen & Monakov, Mikhail S. (2001). Stalin's Ocean-Going Fleet: Soviet Naval Strategy and Shipbuilding Programs 1935–1953. London: Frank Cass. ISBN 0-7146-4895-7.
- Wright, Christopher C. (1994). "The Fate of the Tashkent". Warship International. XXXI (4): 348–360. ISSN 0043-0374.
- Yakubov, Vladimir & Worth, Richard (2008). "The Soviet Project 7/7U Destroyers". In Jordan, John & Dent, Stephen (eds.). Warship 2008. London: Conway. pp. 99–114. ISBN 978-1-84486-062-3.
