= Brawijaya =

Brawijaya may refer to:

- Prabu Brawijaya, a king of the Majapahit Empire
- Kodam V/Brawijaya, a military area command of the Indonesian Army, as the 5th Kodam
- Brawijaya University, a public university in Malang, Indonesia
- Brawijaya Stadium, a multi-use stadium in Kediri, Indonesia
- RI Brawidjaja (307), a Skory-class destroyer of the Indonesian Navy
- KRI Brawijaya (320), a Thaon di Revel-class offshore patrol vessel of the Indonesian Navy
- Brawijaya (train), an Indonesian passenger train
