= 130 mm/50 B13 Pattern 1936 =

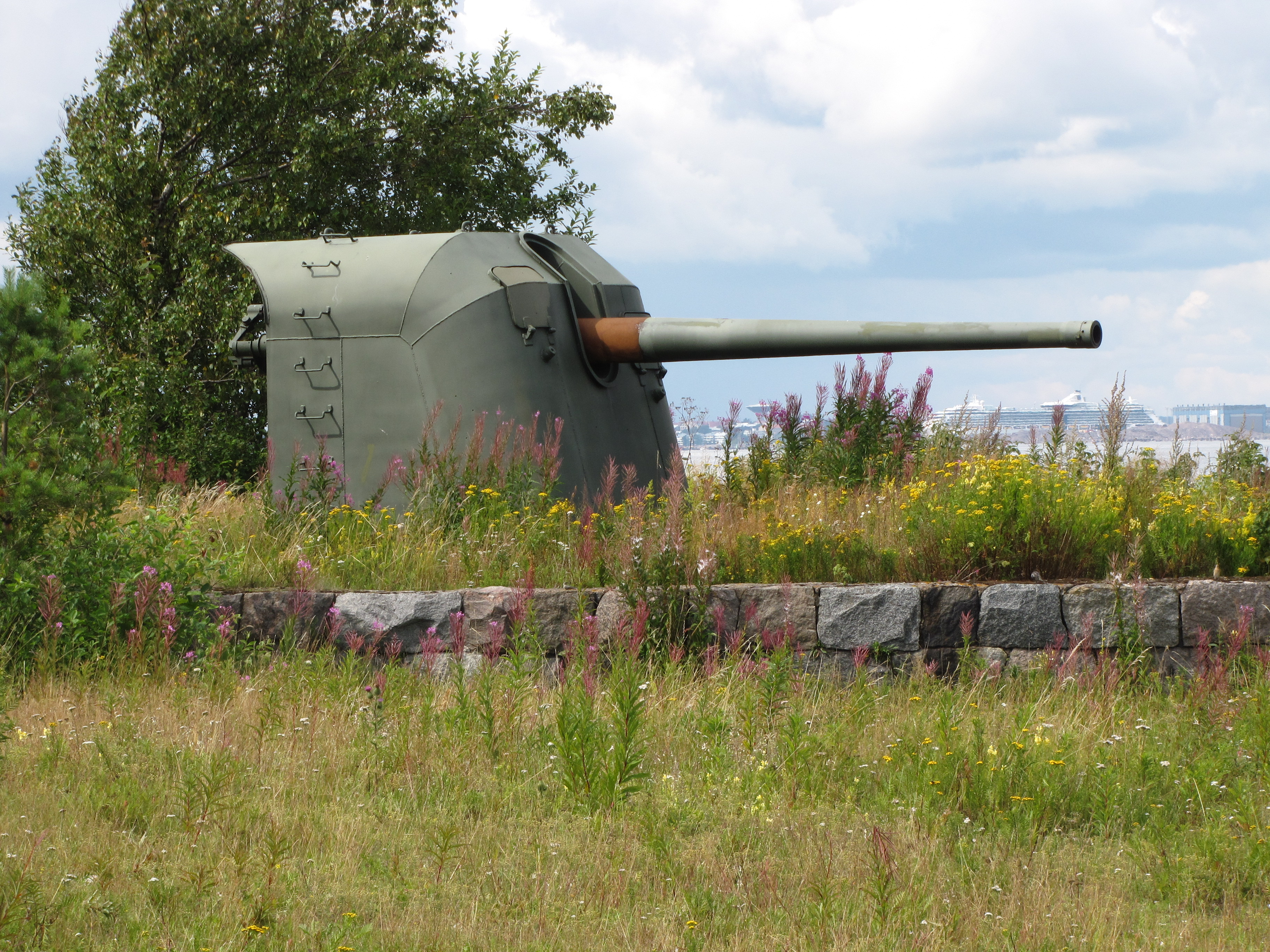
- 130 mm/50 B-13 in Kuivasaari
- Type: Naval and coastal gun
- Place of origin: Soviet Union

Service history
- In service: 1935—1998
- Used by: Soviet Union; People's Republic of China; Poland; Egypt; Indonesia; Finland
- Wars: Second World War

Production history
- Designer: N. N. Magdasijev; G. N. Rafalovits
- Designed: 1929—1935
- Manufacturer: Bolshevik Plant no. 232
- Produced: 1935—1954
- No. built: 1199

Specifications
- Mass: 5,180 kg (11,420 lb) (gun only)
- Length: 6,581 mm (21 ft 7 in)
- Barrel length: 6,450 mm (21 ft 2 in) (bore); 5,199 mm (17 ft 1 in) (rifling)
- Crew: 1+10 (B-13)
- Shell: 130 x 846 mm R
- Caliber: 130 mm (5.1 in)
- Breech: Screw breech
- Elevation: -5° — +45°
- Rate of fire: 5-13 shots/min (depending on mounting)
- Muzzle velocity: 820–870 m/s (2,700–2,900 ft/s) (depending on model and ammunition)
- Maximum firing range: 25,597 m (27,993 yd)

The 130 mm/50 B13 Pattern 1936 was a 130 mm (5.1 in) 50 caliber Soviet naval gun. The weapon was the standard primary armament of Soviet-built destroyers from about 1935 to 1954 (although it would remain in-service well into the 1990s), and it was also utilized as a coastal gun and railway gun. The gun was produced in three different versions which all had incompatible ammunition and range tables. Mountings for the weapon included single open mounts and twin turrets. Besides the Soviet Union, the gun was used on ships sold or donated to Poland, People's Republic of China, Egypt and Indonesia. Finland captured five guns during the Continuation War and used them until the 1990s.

== Background ==
In 1929 design work began in the Soviet Union for a new 130 mm 45 caliber submarine deck gun that would have the same external ballistics as the older 130 mm/55 B7 Pattern 1913 gun. It was intended for the gun to use a wedge lock and fixed ammunition, but the plans were changed already before the prototype was ordered. Blueprints and a prototype was ordered from Bolshevik Plant no. 232 in 1930. The design bureau director was N. N. Magdasijev and project leader G. N. Rafalovits. Others involved in the design were S. A. Morozov, S. A. Zalazaev, B. A. Lever, V. M. Rosenberg and V. I. Kudrjashov. The gun design was changed from submarine to destroyer weapon using separate instead of fixed ammunition and in 1932 new specifications included a change from 45 to 50 calibers and a screw breech block instead of wedge block. During test firing in 1934—35 several shortcomings were found in the gun design, particularly with the breech and loading mechanism. Because the Leningrad-class destroyers that were supposed to use the guns were already under construction the 130 mm B-13 gun was accepted for mass production in 1935 and the first twelve guns were finished during the same year.

== Models ==
In order to match the performance of the longer barreled 130 mm/55 Pattern 1913 gun it was necessary to use a higher barrel pressure in the 130 mm/50 B13 Pattern 1936. This led to such a rapid barrel wear that the Leningrad and Gnevny class destroyers using the first gun versions could not even empty their magazines a single time before needing to change out the barrel. The solution to the excessive barrel wear was found to be deeper rifling grooves. The original design had 1.0 millimetre (0.039 in) deep grooves and a barrel life of 130 rounds; a modified version with 2.7 millimetres (0.11 in) deep grooves had a barrel life of 1100 rounds. Additionally there existed a model with 1.95 millimetres (0.077 in) deep grooves. The gun had 40 grooves with a constant twist. All three gun models with different groove depths had different, mutually incompatible, ammunition, sights and range tables. A loading platform that could be rotated next to the gun barrel was used to deliver the shell to a pneumatic loading mechanism. The gun could be loaded on any elevation angle, but the rate of fire was reduced on elevations higher than +25°. A modified dual-purpose model with 55 caliber barrel suitable for anti-aircraft fire was planned but the project was stopped due to the war.

=== Mountings ===
Early destroyers and coastal guns used single open mountings protected by a Gun shield. An enclosed twin turret was developed for later destroyer classes and monitors.

B-13 was the earliest mounting. This was a single mounting open from the rear and protected by a 13-millimetre (0.51 in) gun shield against shrapnel and bullets. This mounting was used in the destroyers constructed the before Second World War and in coastal and railway guns. The weight of the mount was 12 metric tons (11.8 long tons) and it was equipped with indicators for a central fire control system, but had hand-operated training and elevation. To fire the gun, a string would be attached to a hole at the end of the gun, as was the standard system at the time.

B-2LM was a twin turret used in later destroyer classes. It was intended to use this turret to arm the Soviet destroyer Opytny, but the ship was equipped with B-13 mounts instead. The destroyer leader Tashkent was initially equipped with B-13 mounts, but received the planned B-2LM turrets during a refit. Additionally the lead ship of the Storozhevoy-class destroyers, Storozhevoy, was also refitted with a single B-2LM turret forward. The turret was used to arm the post-war Ognevoy-class and Skoryy-class destroyers. The weight of the turret was 49 metric tons (48.2 long tons).

B-2LMT twin turret was used as the armament on the monitors Sivash and Perekop and with Shilka-class monitors. Weight 90.9 metric tons (89.5 long tons).

B-28 twin turret was used on the monitor Khasan, weight 83.7 metric tons (82.4 long tons).

B-2-U was a planned dual-purpose universal twin turret (U = Universal'naya) that could have been used effectively also as an anti-aircraft weapon. This turret was planned to use a new 55-caliber model of the B-13 gun and to have a maximum elevation of 85° with a weight of 48.4 metric tons (47.6 long tons). Due to the war the project was stopped and neither the turret nor the guns were produced.

== Service in Soviet Union ==
130 mm/50 B13 gun was the standard armament of the newest destroyers of Soviet Union during World War II and it was used to arm the destroyers built in Soviet Union until 1954. The destroyers classes armed with 130 mm/50 B-13 gun were the Leningrad-class (project 1 and modified project 38 Minsk class), Tashkent, Gnevny class, Soobrazitelny class, Opytny, Ognevoy class and Skoryy class. The mass production of the gun resulted in more than one thousand guns being built, and the gun was also used to arm smaller warships and as a coastal gun. The coastal guns remained in use until the fall of the Soviet Union, and in the 1970s 90 guns in 20 batteries were installed in Muravyov-Amursky Peninsula to protect Vladivostok from a possible Chinese attack.

== Service in Finland ==
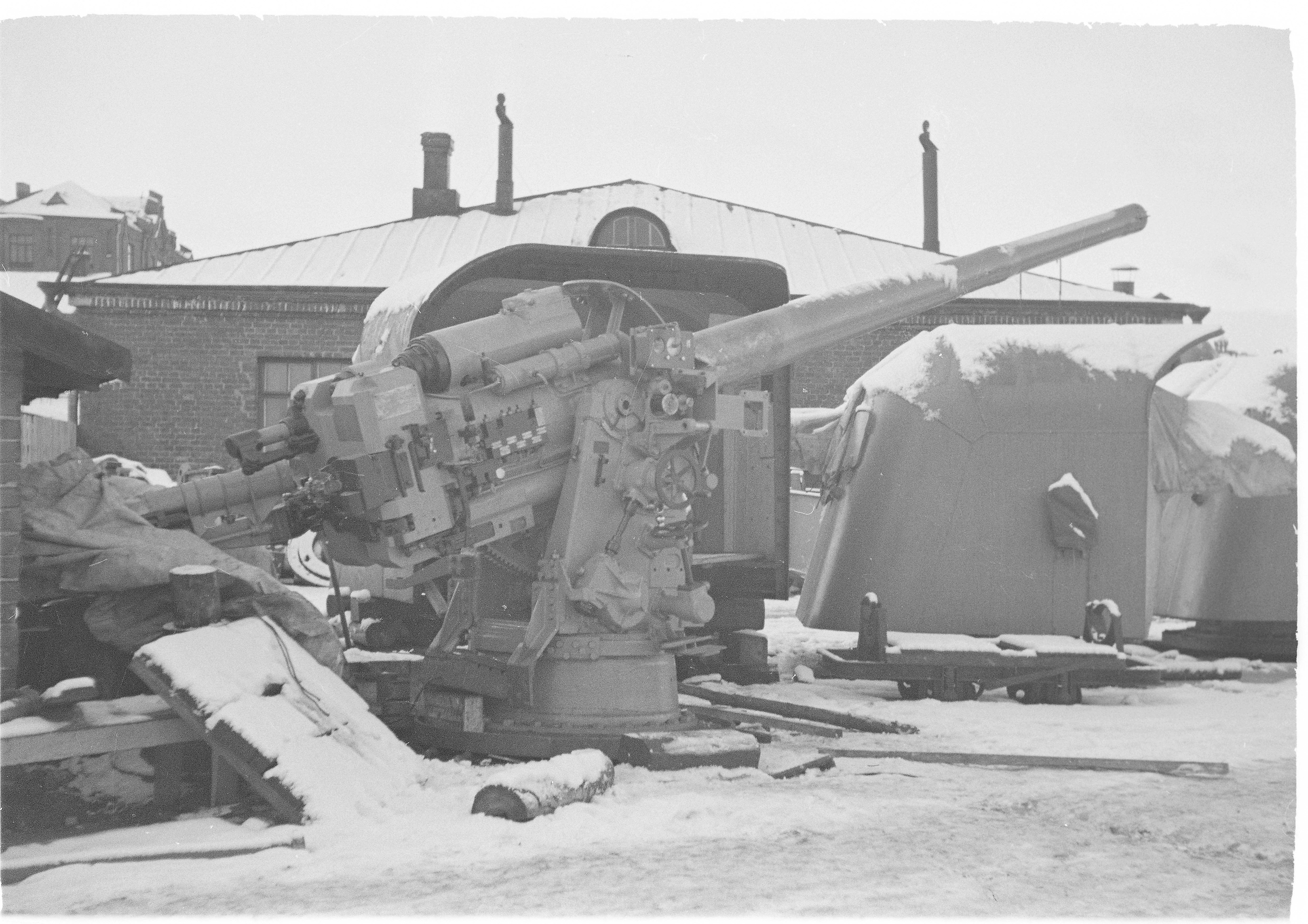
One of the 130/50 N guns captured by Finland

Finland captured several 130 mm/50 B13 guns during the Battle of Hanko. The captured guns were known in Finland as 130/50 N or 130 mm 50 kaliiperin merikanuuna mallia N (130 mm 50 caliber coastal gun model N). Soviet Union had four batteries of B-13 guns in Hanko, but they were damaged or blown up when the Russians evacuated Hanko. Valtion Tykkitehdas (State Artillery Factory) and Helsinki Naval Base ordance personnel succeeded in repairing five guns. Only a few hundred rounds of ammunition were captured, so Finns began manufacturing suitable ammunition domestically. Captured Russian ammunition included modern high explosive fragmentation shells with point and base fuzes and semi-armour piercing shells, while the Finnish produced ammunition were older style high explosive shells. Three captured guns were used for short periods of time in Pihlajasaari and Miessaari forts by Uusimaa Coastal Brigade. Two guns were used to arm the auxiliary gunboats Aunus and Viena.

Three guns were converted into railway guns 130/50 NRaut (Raut = rautatietykki, railway gun) in 1964 in the Hanko Coastal Artillery Battalion. The railway wagon was attached to rails with clamps and supported from the sides by wooden planks and support beams on track sides. In 1972 the three guns were converted back to static coastal guns and installed on Glosholma fort of the Suomenlinna Coastal Artillery Regiment. Three spare gun shields were used on 152/46 VLo guns installed in Sommarö fort on Replot and two other gun shields as armoured observation posts on the test fire sites at Puolustusvoimien Tutkimuskeskus (Finnish Defense Forces Research Facility) and Keuruun Pioneerivarikko (Keuruu Engineering Depot). In the 1980s it was attempted to convert the ammunition of the 130/50 N guns as sea target shells for 130 TK turret guns, but the project failed. The three guns in Glosholma were removed from service in the 1990s, but left on their positions. Additionally two spare guns were in storage. One gun was placed on display in Kuivasaari in 2005. The origin of the designation N (also Nl or NI) is uncertain, but most likely stood for Neuvostoliittolainen (from Soviet Union). The gun had a nickname Nikolajev in Finland.

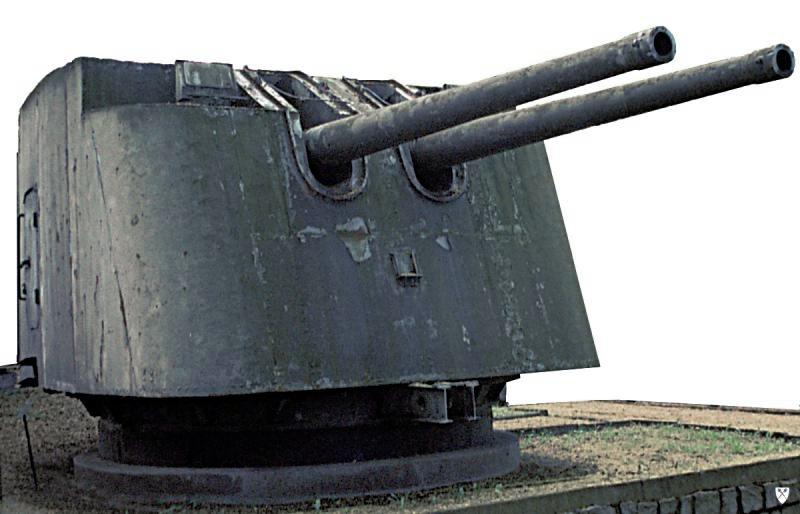
B-2LM turret of the Polish destroyer Wicher

== Service in other countries ==
Two Skoryy class destroyers were transferred to the Polish Navy in the late 1950s. Additionally 130 mm B-13 guns were used as coastal guns in Hel Fortified Area. Skoryy-class destroyers were also sold to Egypt (six ships) and Indonesia (seven ships). Four Gnevny-class destroyers were donated by Soviet Union to People's Republic of China as Anshan-class destroyers.

== Modifications ==
In the early 1940s an attempt was made in the Soviet Union to mount the 130 mm B-13 gun on a tank chassis. After Winter War one of the T-100 tank prototypes was refitted with a hull mounted 130 mm B-13 naval gun. This vehicle was known as SU-100Y and the prototype was used in action during the Battle of Moscow. The prototype survived the war and is now on display in Kubinka Tank Museum.
