= ORP Wicher (1958) =

1949 Project 30bis-class destroyer

Coordinates: 54°36′46″N 18°46′38″E

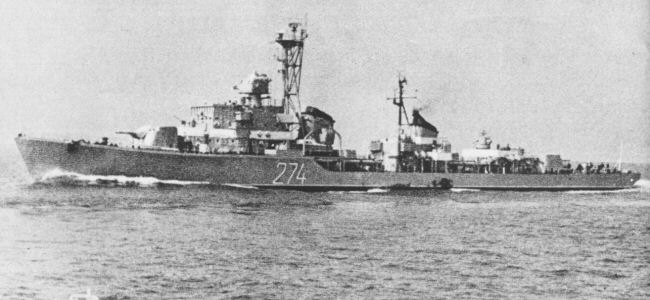
- ORP Wicher of the Polish Navy

History

PRL
- Name: ORP Wicher
- Builder: Zhdanov Shipyard, Leningrad
- Yard number: 603
- Laid down: 15 February 1949
- Launched: 14 August 1949
- Acquired: from USSR, 29 June 1958
- Decommissioned: 1975
- Fate: Scrapped; remainings sunk in Hel as breakwater

General characteristics
- Class & type: Project 30bis destroyer
- Displacement: 2,316 long tons (2,353 t) standard, 3,066 long tons (3,115 t) full load
- Length: 120.5 m (395 ft 4 in)
- Beam: 12 m (39 ft 4 in)
- Draught: 3.9 m (12 ft 10 in)
- Propulsion: 2 shaft geared turbines, 3 boilers, 60,000 shp (45,000 kW)
- Speed: 36.5 knots (67.6 km/h; 42.0 mph)
- Range: 4,080 nautical miles (7,560 km; 4,700 mi) at 16 kn (30 km/h; 18 mph)
- Complement: 286
- Armament: 2 × 130 mm (5.1 in) B13 guns in a B-2LM turret; 1 × twin 85 mm (3.3 in) AA gun; 7 × single 37 mm (1.5 in) AA guns; 2 × quintuple 533 mm (21 in) torpedo tubes; 60 mines or 52 depth charges

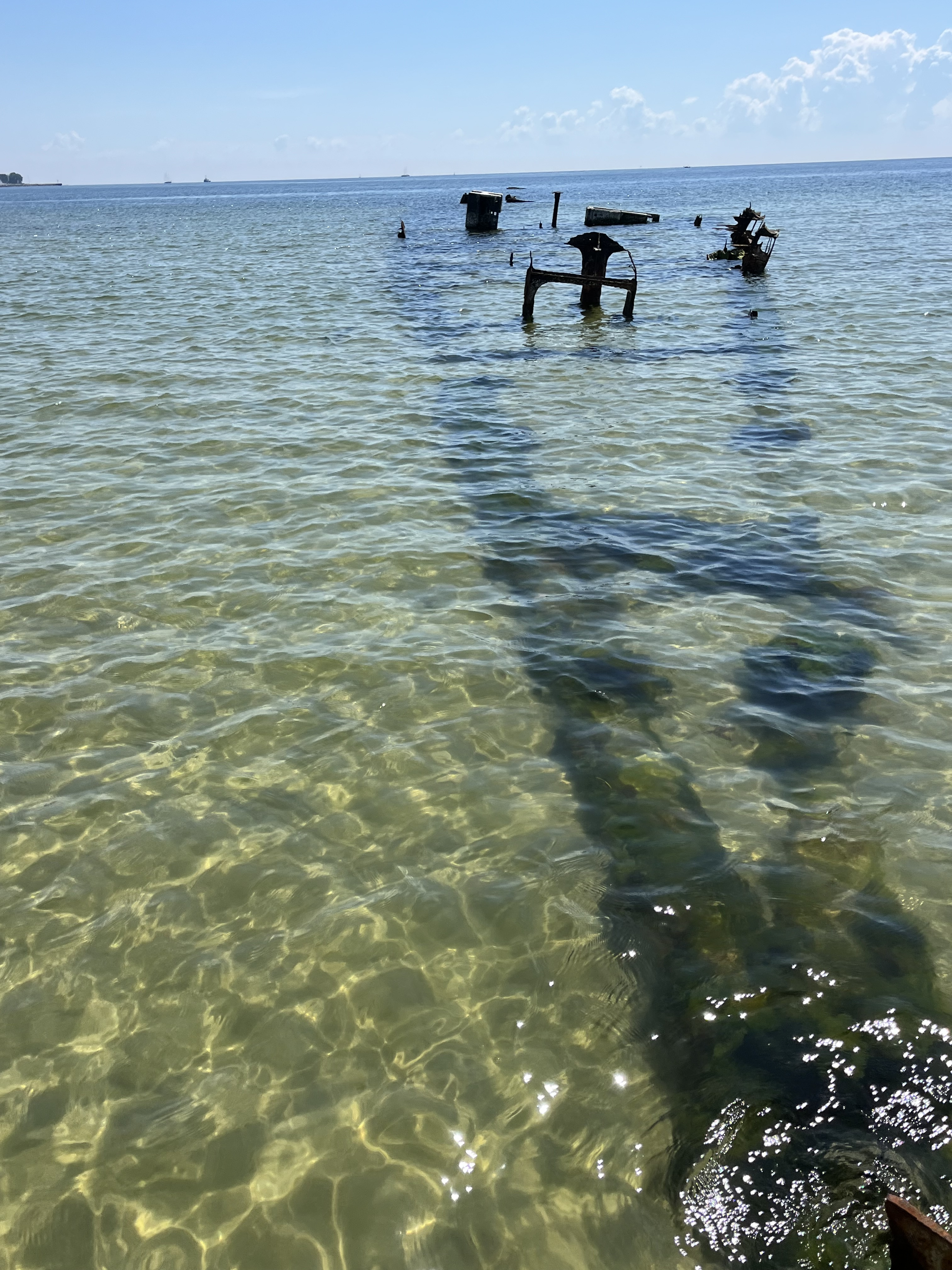
The ship's beached wreck in Hel

ORP Wicher (English: Whirlwind) was a Project 30bis destroyer, transferred to the People's Republic of Poland from the Soviet Union in 1958. She was built by the Zhdanov shipyard in Leningrad and originally commissioned into the Soviet Baltic Fleet as the Skoryy ("Rapid") in 1951, and transferred to Poland in 1958 together with a second ship, ORP Grom. The ship was decommissioned in 1975, and scrapped. One of the 130 mm guns is preserved in the Polish Navy Museum in Gdynia. Remainings of the scrapped vessel were sunk at the beach in Hel as breakwater, where they remain to this day.
