= Skory-class destroyer =

Soviet destroyers built 1949–1953

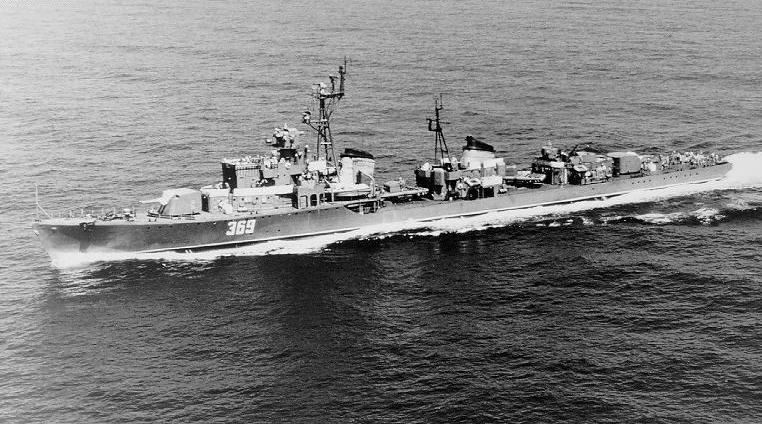
- Project 30bis Skory-class destroyer

Class overview
- Name: Skory-class
- Operators: Soviet Navy; Egyptian Navy; Indonesian Navy; Polish Navy
- Preceded by: Ognevoy class
- Succeeded by: Neustrashimy class
- Built: 1949–1953
- In service: 1949–1984
- Completed: 70

General characteristics
- Displacement: 2,316 long tons (2,353 t) standard, 3,066 long tons (3,115 t) full load
- Length: 120.5 m (395 ft 4 in)
- Beam: 12 m (39 ft 4 in)
- Draught: 3.9 m (12 ft 10 in)
- Propulsion: 2 shaft geared turbines, 3 boilers 60,000 shp (44,742 kW)
- Speed: 36.5 knots (67.6 km/h; 42.0 mph)
- Range: 4,080 nautical miles (7,556 km; 4,695 mi) at 16 kn (30 km/h; 18 mph)
- Complement: 286
- Sensors & processing systems: Radars: Gyus-1, Ryf-1, Redan-2, Vympel-2; Sonar: Tamir-5h
- Armament: 2 × 2 – 130 mm (5.1 in) guns; 1 × 2 – 85 mm (3.3 in) AA guns; 7 × 1 – 37 mm (1.5 in) AA guns; 2 × 5 – 533 mm (21 in) torpedo tubes; 60 mines or 52 depth charges; Modernisation included removing one set of torpedo tubes, replacing the 37 mm guns with 57 mm guns and adding RBU 2500 anti-submarine rockets

The Skory class were the first destroyers built for the Soviet Navy after World War II. Seventy (70) ships were built between 1949 and 1953. The Soviet designation was Project 30bis.

== Design ==
The ships were derived from the Project 30 Ognevoy-class destroyer, but were slightly larger with better sea-keeping and significantly increased endurance. These ships were longitudinally framed and completely welded. The ships were built in 101 modular pre-fabricated sections which led to rapid building times. The machinery and main armament was essentially identical to those of the Ognevoy-class destroyers but the boilers employed forced draught for increased power.

=== Modernisation ===
The ships were modernised in the 1950s with new anti-aircraft guns and anti-submarine mortars and updated sensors (new radar and sonar). One bank of torpedo tubes were removed and extra accommodation (deckhouses) added.

== Ships ==
70 ships were built for both the Soviet navy and for export, this is the largest production run for any large Soviet surface warship.

Soviet ships:

- Baltic Fleet – 16 ships, built by Zhdanov yard Leningrad, all names began with letter S
  - Smely (Courageous)
  - Stoyky (Persistent)
  - Skory (Speedy) →transferred to Poland as ORP Wicher
  - Surovy (Savage)
  - Serdity (Severe)
  - Sposobny (Capable)
  - Stremitelny (Impetuous)
  - Sokrushitelny (Destructive)
  - Svobodny (Free)
  - Statny (Handsome or Well-Proportioned)
  - Smetlivy (Resourceful) → transferred to Poland as ORP Grom
  - Smotryashchy (Observant)
  - Sovershenny (Perfect)
  - Seriozny (Serious)
  - Solidny (Solid)
  - Stepenny (Sedate)
  - Pylky (Ardent) →transferred to Indonesia as KRI Diponegoro
- Black Sea Fleet – 18 ships, built by Nikolaev yards, Names began with letter B
  - Bditelny (Watchful)
  - Bezuderzhny (Irrestrainable)
  - Buyny (Rambunctious)
  - Bezuprechny (Irreproachable)
  - Besstrashny (Fearless)
  - Boyevoy (Militant) →transferred to Indonesia as KRI Sultan Darmuda
  - Bystry (Rapid)
  - Burny (Turbulent) →transferred to Egypt as Suez
  - Besposhchadny (Merciless)
  - Bezzhalostny (Ruthless) →transferred to Indonesia as KRI Brawidjaja
  - Bezzavetny (Whole-hearted) →transferred to Indonesia as KRI Sultan Iskandar Muda
  - Besshumny (Noiseless)
  - Bespokoyny (Restless) →transferred to Indonesia as KRI Sandjaja
  - Bezboyaznenny (Dauntless)
  - Bezotkazny (Troubleproof)
  - Bessmenny (Unchanging) →transferred to Egypt as Damiet
  - Bezukoriznenny (Immaculate)
- Northern Fleet – 18 ships built by Severodvinsk yard, Names began with letter O
  - Ognenny (Fiery)
  - Otchetlivy (Clear)
  - Ostry (Sharp)
  - Otvetstvenny (Responsible)
  - Otmenny (Excellent)
  - Otryvisty (Jerky)
  - Otrazhayushchy (Reflecting)
  - Otradny (Cuddly)
  - Ozarenny (Afflative)
  - Oberegayushchy (Protective)
  - Ostorozhny (Careful)
  - Okrylenny (Winged)
  - Otchayanny (Foolhardy) →transferred to Egypt as El Nasser
  - Opasny (Dangerous)
  - Otzyvchivy (Responsive)
  - Ozhivlenny (Lively)
  - Ozhestochenny (Embittered)
  - Okhranyayushchy (Safeguarding)
- Pacific Fleet – 17 ships, built by Komsomolsk-on-Amur yard, names began with V
  - Vstrechny (Counter)
  - Vedushchy (Leading)
  - Vazhny (Considerable)
  - Vspylchivy (Spitfire)
  - Velichavy (Stately, Majestic)
  - Vertky (Nimble)
  - Vechny (Enduring)
  - Vikhrevoy (Stormy)
  - Vidny (Prominent)
  - Verny (Faithful)
  - Vnimatelny (Intent)
  - Vnezapny (Unexpected) →transferred to Indonesia as KRI Sarwadjala, later renamed as KRI Sawunggaling
  - Vyrazitelny (Expressive) →transferred to Indonesia as KRI Singamangaradja
  - Volevoy (Willful) →transferred to Indonesia as KRI Siliwangi
  - Volny (Free)
  - Vkradchivy (Insinuating)
  - Vdumchivy (Thoughtful)
  - Vrazumitelny (Intelligible)

Exported ships were:

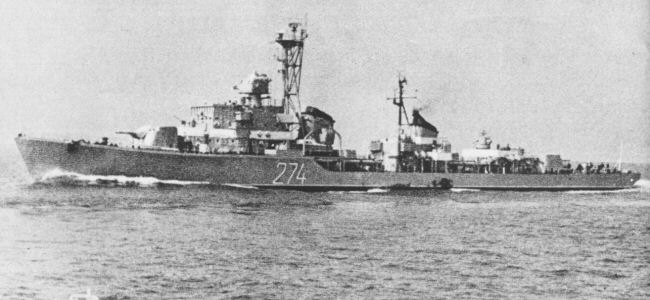
ORP Wicher of the Polish Navy

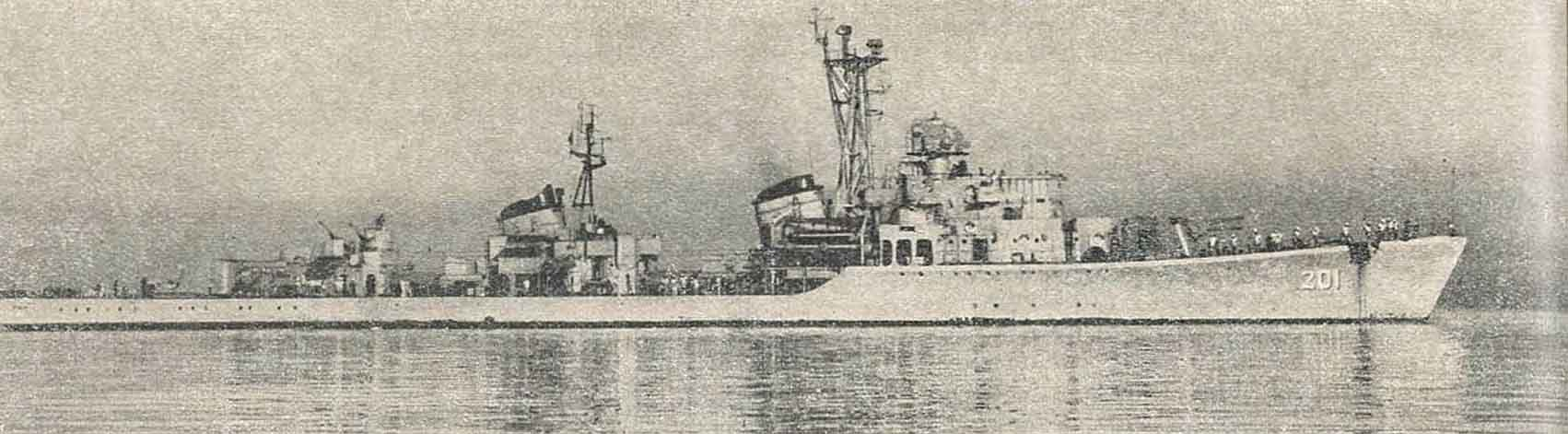
KRI Siliwangi of the Indonesian Navy

- Egyptian Navy – 3 ships acquired between 1954 and 1958, one sunk in 1967, rest retired in 1985–86.
- Indonesian Navy – 8 ships transferred from Baltic, Black Sea and Pacific Fleets
- Polish Navy – 2 ships transferred from Baltic Fleet

The Soviet ships were decommissioned and scrapped between 1965 and 1984.

== See also ==
- List of ships of the Soviet Navy
- List of ships of Russia by project number

Equivalent destroyers of the same era

- Holland class
- Ayanami class
- Östergötland class
- Zerstörer 1 class
- Artigliere class
