= 85 mm air defense gun M1939 (52-K) =

85 mm air defense gun M1939 (52-К)
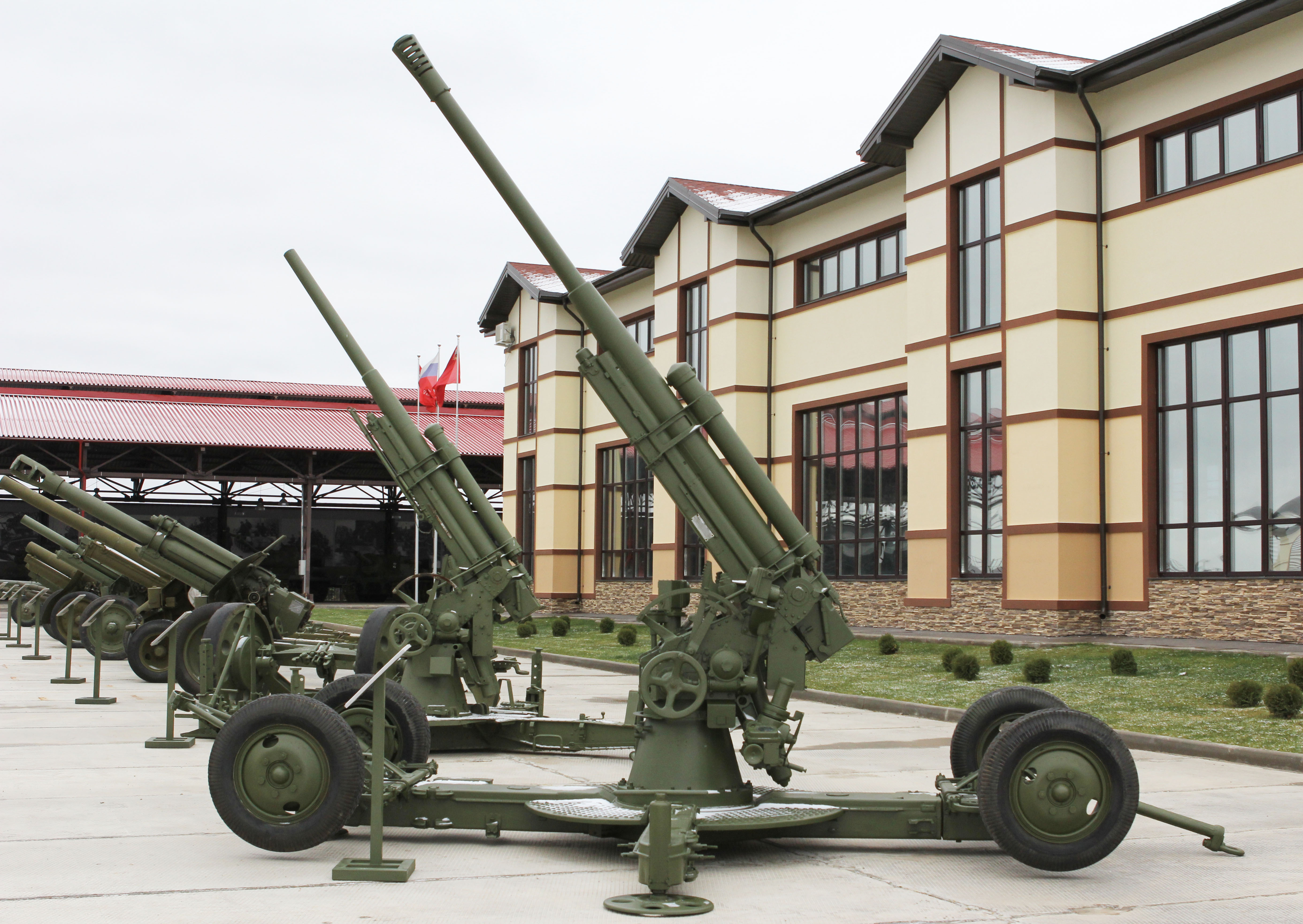
- Type: Anti-aircraft gun Tank gun
- Place of origin: Soviet Union

Service history
- Wars: World War II

Production history
- Produced: 1939–1945

Specifications
- Mass: combat: 4,500 kg (9,921 lbs) travel: 4,500 kg (9,921 lbs)
- Length: 7.05 m (23 ft 2 in)
- Barrel length: 4.7 m (15 ft 5 in); 55 Calibers
- Width: 2.15 m (7 ft 1 in)
- Height: 2.25 m (7 ft 5 in)
- Crew: 7
- Shell: 85×629 mmR
- Shell weight: 9.2 kg (20 lb 5 oz)
- Caliber: 85 mm (3.34 in)
- Breech: Vertical sliding-wedge
- Recoil: Hydro-pneumatic
- Carriage: 2-axle and 4-wheeled with outriggers
- Elevation: -3° to 82°
- Traverse: 360°
- Rate of fire: 10-12 rounds per minute
- Muzzle velocity: 792 m/s (2,598 ft/s)
- Effective firing range: 10,500m (34,448 ft) (vertical range)
- Maximum firing range: 15.65 km (51,127 ft) (9.72 mi)

The 85 mm air defense gun M1939 (52-K) (Russian: 85-мм зенитная пушка обр. 1939 г. (52-К)) was an 85 mm (3.3 in) Soviet anti-aircraft gun, developed under guidance of leading Soviet designers M. N. Loginov and G. D. Dorokhin. This gun was successfully used throughout the Second World War against level bombers and other high- and medium-altitude targets. In emergencies they were utilized as powerful anti-tank weapons. The barrel of the 52-K was the basis for the family of 85-mm Soviet tank guns. After the war some 52-Ks were refitted for peaceful purposes as anti-avalanche guns in mountainous terrain.

Virtually every country behind the Iron Curtain received this gun after World War II for their air defense. In the Soviet Union itself, these guns were largely superseded by the 100 and 130 mm guns.

== Description ==
Adopted in 1939, the 85-mm M1939, like its German counterpart the 88-mm Flak 18/36/37, was meant for air defense. Like many anti-aircraft (AA) guns of the era it was also provided with anti-tank ammunition in the event a tank should appear.

== Organization ==
85-mm M1939 guns were organized into heavy anti-aircraft regiments of 16 guns. The regiments were organized into divisions of the field anti-aircraft forces.

== Tank guns ==
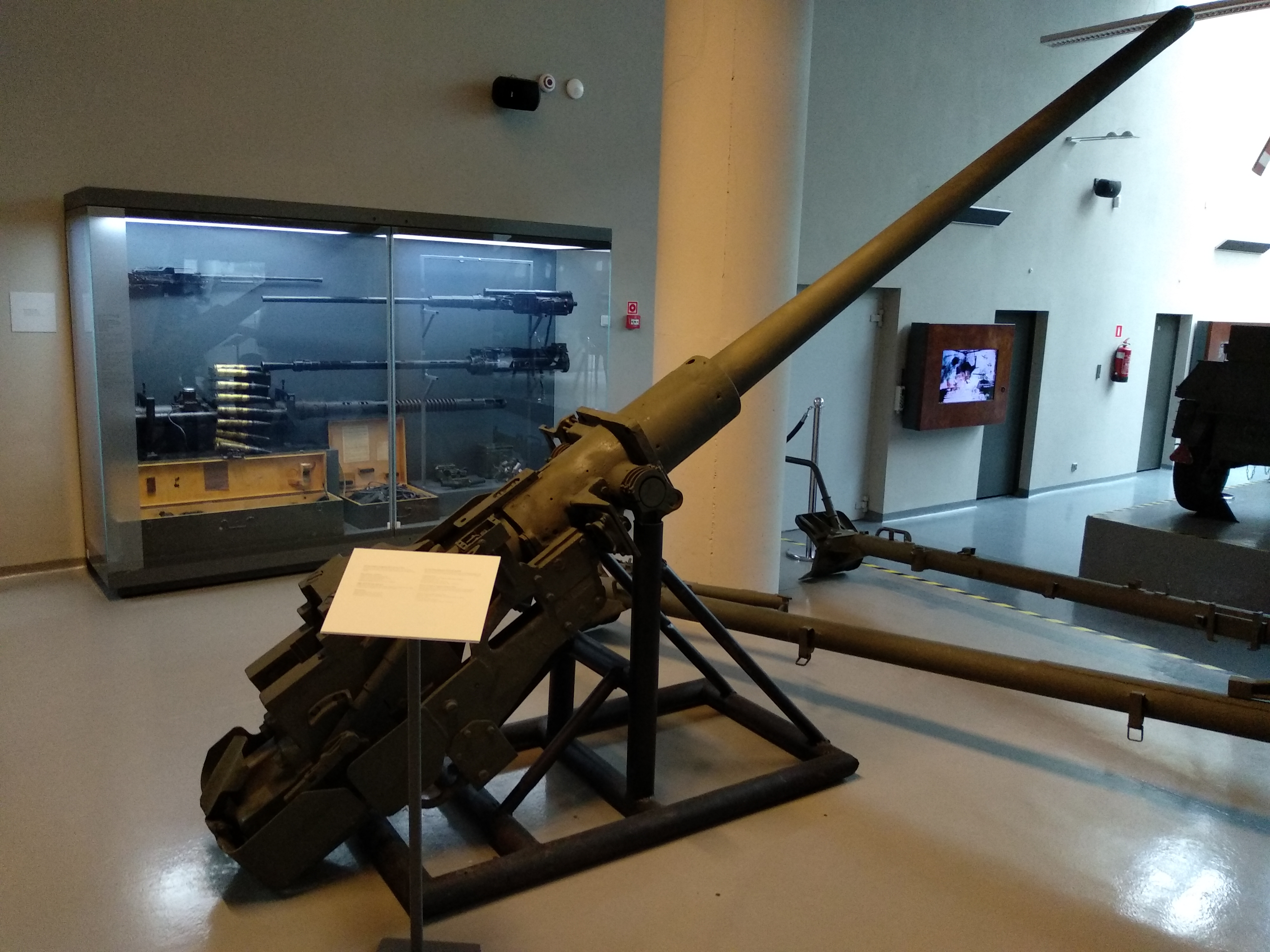
A ZiS-S-53 at the Arsenal Museum in Zamość, Poland.

By 1942, the 76.2mm F-34 tank gun of the T-34 medium tank was found to be lacking in range and penetration compared to the German 75 mm Pak 40 anti-tank gun, new mounted on the Stug III and Panzer IV, and markedly inferior to the 88-mm gun of the Tiger I. Military planners directed the design bureaus of both Gen. Vasiliy Grabin and Gen. Fyodor Petrov to modify the 85mm anti-aircraft gun for use as an anti-tank weapon.

Petrov's bureau developed the D-5 85mm gun. Though much too large for the T-34 turret, it could be mounted in the chassis of the SU-122 self-propelled gun to create a tank destroyer. This was done, and the SU-85 tank destroyer went into production. Meanwhile, efforts were underway to redesign the T-34 turret to make it large enough to accommodate the newly developed gun.

Grabin, who had been working on a second 85mm gun, the ZiS-53, at Joseph Stalin Factory No. 92 in Gorky near Moscow, was reassigned to the Central Artillery Design Bureau (TsAKB) in Moscow. His project was turned over to 23-year-old A. Savin. A third team led by K. Siderenko was assigned to yet another 85mm gun project, and developed the S-18, to be used in the modified T-34 turret.

The resulting guns were tested at Gorokhoviesky Proving Grounds near Gorky, with Grabin's ZiS-53 winning the competition. However, the new T-34/85's turret had been designed to accommodate the already-available D-5 gun, and did not mate properly with Grabin's gun. The T-34/85 tank went into production making use of the D-5 gun (designated D-5T, for "tank").

Savin was put to work modifying Grabin's gun to fit the new turret and incorporate other improvements. His initial was added to his gun's designation in recognition of his contribution: the ZiS-S-53. From T-34/85 Model 1944 onwards, all T-34/85s used Savin's ZiS-S-53. It went into production in the spring of 1944. A new antitank gun was then developed, the 100 mm field gun M1944 (BS-3).

== Penetration comparison ==
Calculated penetration figures at (90 degrees) against US 240 BRN rolled test plate and 50% success criteria and allowing direct comparison to foreign gun performance.
Gun type	Ammunition type	Muzzle velocity (m/s)	Penetration (mm)									
Gun type	Ammunition type	Muzzle velocity (m/s)	100 m	250 m	500 m	750 m	1000 m	1250 m	1500 m	2000 m	2500 m	3000 m
85mm/L52 (D-5T)	AP	792 m/s (2,600 ft/s)	142	135	125	116	107	99	92	78	67	57
85mm/L52 (D-5T)	APBC	792 m/s (2,600 ft/s)	139	133	123	114	105	98	91	81	73	65
85mm/L52 (D-5T)	APCR	1,050 m/s (3,400 ft/s)	175	159	136	117	100	85	73	54	39	29

== See also ==
- Designations of Russian towed artillery

=== Weapons of comparable role, performance and era ===
- British QF 3.7-inch AA gun
- German 8.8 cm Flak 18/36/37/41
- Italian Cannone da 90/53
- US 90 mm Gun M1

== Bibliography ==
- Hogg, Ian (2000). Twentieth-Century Artillery. Friedman/Fairfax Publishers. ISBN 1-58663-299-X.
- Jane's Armour and Artillery (1982). Jane's Publishing Company, Ltd. ISBN 0-7106-0727-X.yj
- Shunkov V. N. - The Weapons of the Red Army, Mn. Harvest, 1999 (Шунков В. Н. - Оружие Красной Армии. — Мн.: Харвест, 1999.) ISBN 985-433-469-4.
- Zaloga, Steven J., James Grandsen (1984). Soviet Tanks and Combat Vehicles of World War Two, London: Arms and Armour Prembss. ISBN 0-85368-606-8.
