= B-2LM =

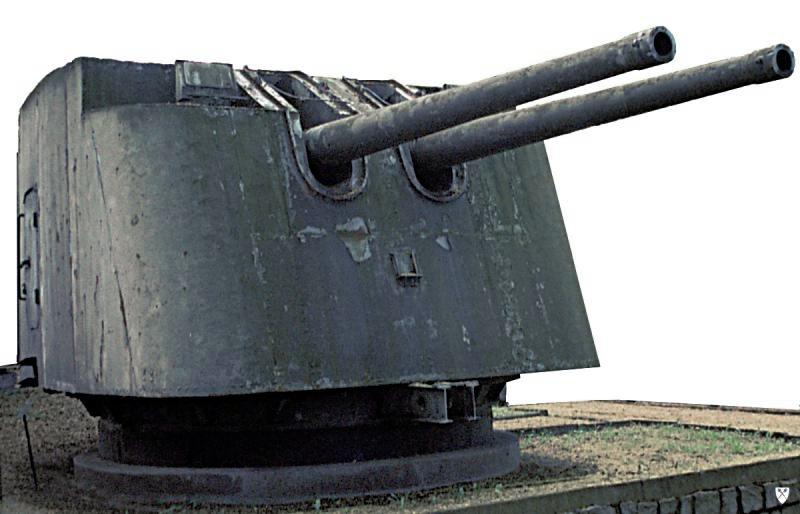
- B-2LM
- Type: Naval gun
- Place of origin: USSR

Service history
- Wars: Great Patriotic War (1941-1945)

Production history
- Designed: 1938–1939
- Manufacturer: Leningradsky Metallichesky Zavod; Bolshevik Plant (turret drive production)
- Produced: 1940–1953

Specifications
- Barrel length: 6.45 m (50 calibers)
- Caliber: 130mm (5.1 inch)
- Rate of fire: 12 rounds per minute

"B-2LM" (Russian: "Б-2ЛМ") is a Soviet 130 mm two-gun naval artillery turret, based on the "B-13" ("Б-13") gun. Production started in 1939. "B-2LM" was established on several Soviet Navy ships, including the destroyer leader Tashkent, the Ognevoy-class destroyer (Project 30 and 30K), and the Skory-class destroyer (Project 30bis). However, it had a relatively low rate of fire and had a maximum elevation of 45 degrees making it incapable of anti-aircraft fire.

== General characteristics ==
- Maximum laying speed: vertical - 9.85 degrees per second, horizontal - 9.7 degrees per second
- Shell weight: 33.5 kg (74 lbs)
- Initial velocity of the shell: 870 m/s
- Range: 25,597 m

== History ==
The TTZ (тактико-техническое задание, tactical-technical assignment) for a twin-130 mm gun turret was ordered on April 15, 1936. The preliminary design for the B-2LM was approved on October 19, 1938. Later, the completed design was designed by OKB-172 (formerly Motovilikha Gun Plant and the Motovilikha Machine-Building Plant, later renamed the Perm Machine-Building Plant) and officially accepted on 16 February 1939. A prototype unit would be tested in the LMZ (Leningrad Metal Plant) throughout July—August 1940.

Range testing occurred in two phases with 240 firings, the first from 4 December 1940 until 27 January 1941 (55 days) and the second from 27 April to 27 May 1941 (31 days), totalling 86 days of testing. During testing, the B-2LM performed well and was nominated for service, with three turrets finally being installed on the destroyer leader Tashkent by 8 July 1941, in place of the 130 mm B-13 naval gun. Tashkent would later undergo state ship trials in Sevastopol Bay in July 1941, bearing the new armament.

However, five B-2LM turrets were abandoned in Shipyard No. 183 in Nikolayev (now Mykolaiv) before its capture on 16 August 1941. Serial production would commence in 1942 in Shipyard No. 402 (Severodvinsk), continuing until 1953 in the Bolshevik Plant, Severokramatorsk Machine-Building Plant, and Plant No. 75 (Yurga).
