= Black Sea Shipyard =

Shipyard in Mykolaiv, Ukraine

Coordinates: 46.9467°N 31.9800°E

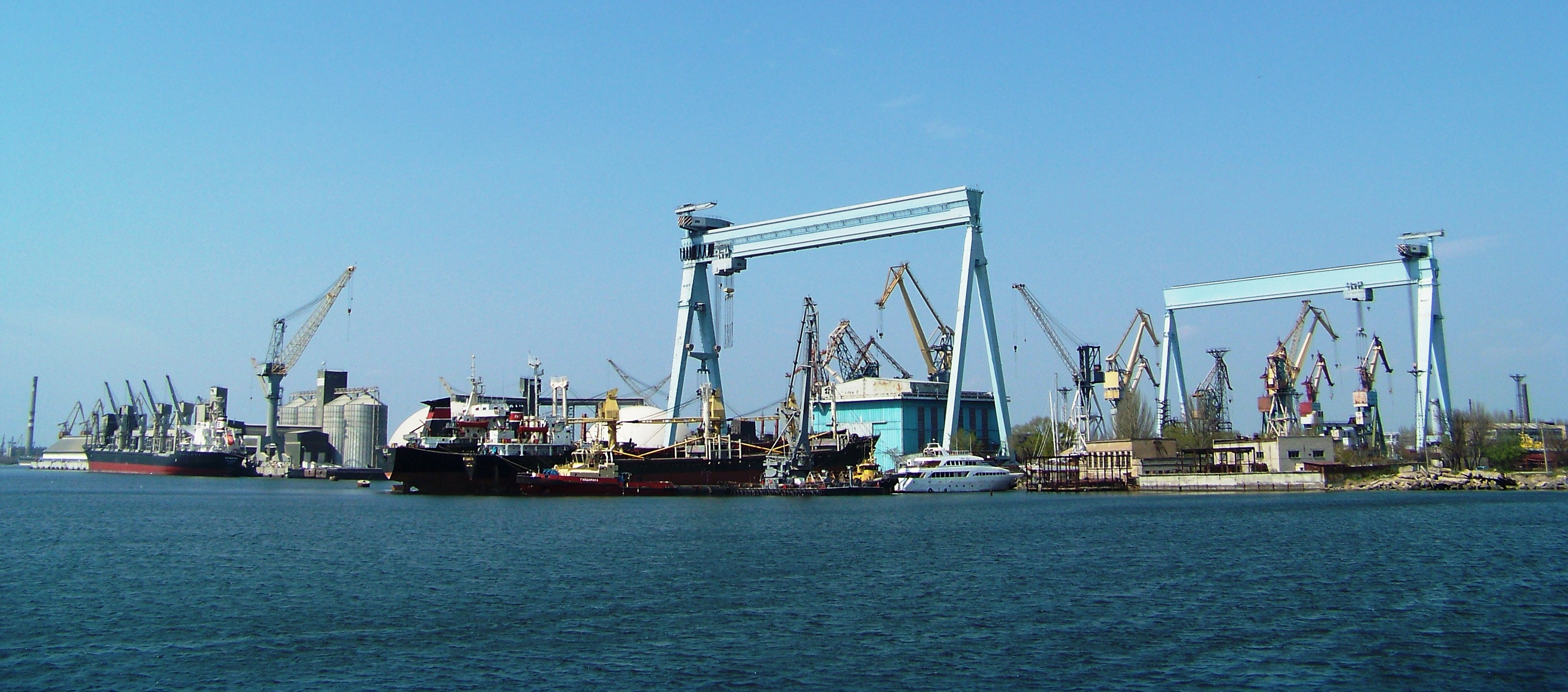
- The Black Sea Shipyard in 2010
- Company type: Shipyard
- Industry: Shipbuilding
- Predecessors: Nikolayev Shipbuilding, Mechanical, and Iron Works; Associated Nikolayev (Naval) Shipyard; Andre Marti (South) Yard (Shipyard No. 198); Shipyard No. 444 (in the name of I. I. Nosenko); Chernomorsky Shipyard
- Founded: 1895; 130 years ago in Mykolaiv (at the time known as Nikolayev), Russian Empire
- Defunct: June 25, 2021
- Fate: Bankruptcy
- Parent: Ukroboronprom

The Black Sea Shipyard (Ukrainian: Чорноморський суднобудівний завод; Russian: Черноморский судостроительный завод) was a shipbuilding facility in Mykolaiv, Ukraine, on the southern tip of the Mykolaiv peninsula. It was founded in 1895 by Belgian interests and began building warships in 1901. At the beginning of World War I in 1914, it was one of the largest industrial facilities in the Russian Empire. The shipyard was moribund in the first decades of the Soviet Union until the Soviets began building up their fleet in the 1930s and it began building surface warships as well as submarines. The yard was badly damaged during World War II and took several years to be rebuilt. Surface warship construction temporarily ended in the mid-1950s before being revived in the mid-1960s and submarines were last built in the yard in late 1950s. The Black Sea Shipyard built all of the aircraft carrying ships of the USSR and Russia and continued before it was liquidated by the economic court of Mykolaiv Oblast on June 25, 2021.

== History ==
In 1895, the shipyard was established as the Association of Shipyards and Foundry Works (Russian: Obshchestvo sudostroitel'nykh i liteinykh zavodov)––a Belgian-owned company and began building warships in 1901. It was merged with the Black Sea Mechanical and Foundry Works (Russian: Chernomorskii mekhanicheskii i liteinyi zavod) in 1908 and was renamed Associated Nikolaev Shipbuilding, Mechanical and Iron Works (Russian: Nikolaevskoe obshchestvo sudostroitel'nykh, mekhanicheskikh i liteinykh zavodov) in 1908. It came under the control of Share Society Nikolaev Works and Shipyards (Russian: Aktsionernoe obshchstvo Nikolaevskikh zavodov i verfei (ONZiV)) in 1911 and was nicknamed the "Naval Shipyard". Around this time it was supported by the British armaments company of Vickers Limited. By 1914 the shipyard employed some 10,400 workers, which made it one of the largest industrial firms in Russia.

After the war, it was renamed the Black Sea Shipbuilding Works (Russian: Chernomorskii sudostroitel'nyi zavod) when it came under the control of the Bolsheviks. During the 1930s it was renamed in honor of André Marti and became the Marti (South) Yard. On 30 December 1936, the yard was redesignated as Shipyard No. 198 (named for Marti). During these early years, the yard constructed surface warships and Dekabrist-class submarines.

In January 1938, Vyacheslav Molotov, the Chairman of the People’s Commissar Council, declared the following:

Our mighty Soviet power must have such a sea and ocean fleet that would comply with her interests and would be worthy of our great mission.

It was then the government introduced the 10-year Big Shipbuilding Program. The plan included the construction of battleships and heavy cruisers which would represent the ocean might and strength of the country.

On 19 October 1940, the government decided to terminate battleship and heavy cruiser construction. It was ordered to concentrate all their efforts on small-size and medium-size warship construction. However, the completion of ships of various previously laid down classes continued. On the whole, the Soviet shipbuilding was once again re-directed for submarine and light surface ship construction. Nevertheless, by the 1950s, an estimated 65 Whiskey-class submarines, Sverdlov-class light cruisers, and the Stalingrad-class battlecruiser were built.

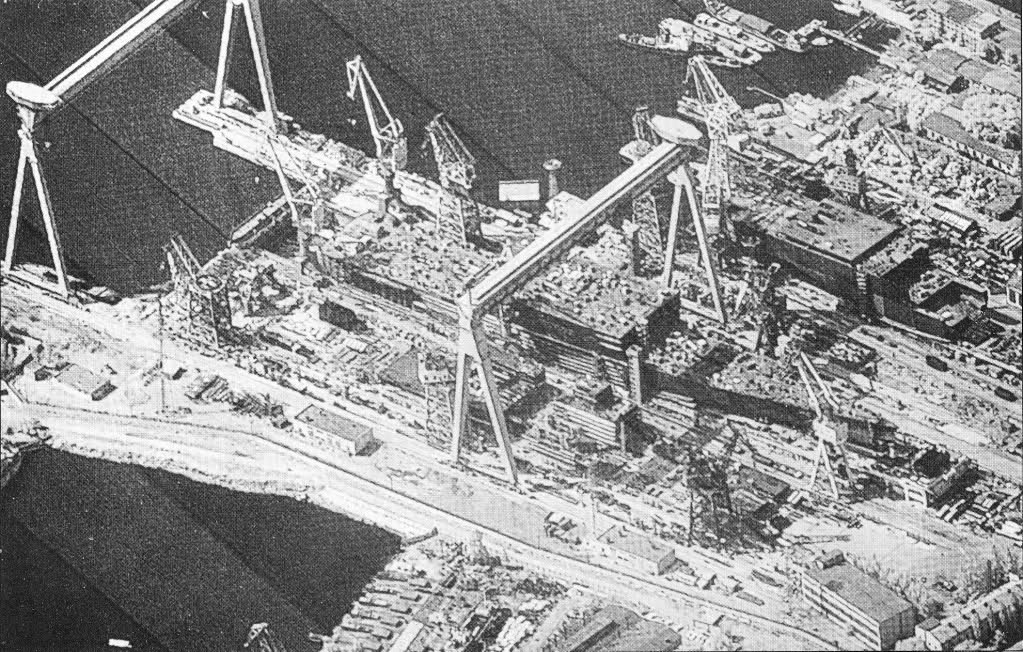
Satellite imagery of the Admiral Kuznetsov under construction c. 1985

During the 1960s, the Moskva-class helicopter carriers and the Kiev-class VSTOL aircraft carrying cruisers were constructed. The fourth Kiev-class, Admiral Gorshkov, was launched in 1982 and later, in 1985, the first Kuznetsov-class, Admiral Kuznetsov, was launched. The Admiral Kuznetsov's hull design is based on the Admiral Gorshkov but is larger with a full load displacement, 58,500 tons as compared to Admiral Gorshkov's 40,400 tons. KH-11 satellite photographs of the construction of the Admiral Kuznetsov were leaked to Jane's Defence Weekly in 1985 by Samuel Loring Morison, a naval intelligence analyst with the U.S. Navy.

Commercial ships and naval auxiliaries were, and continue to be constructed there. Commercial ships are primarily dry-cargo ships, fish-factory ships, and large trawlers. In the late 1970s, the shipyard constructed two large trawlers for the State Committee of Fisheries of Ukraine.

== Facilities and services ==
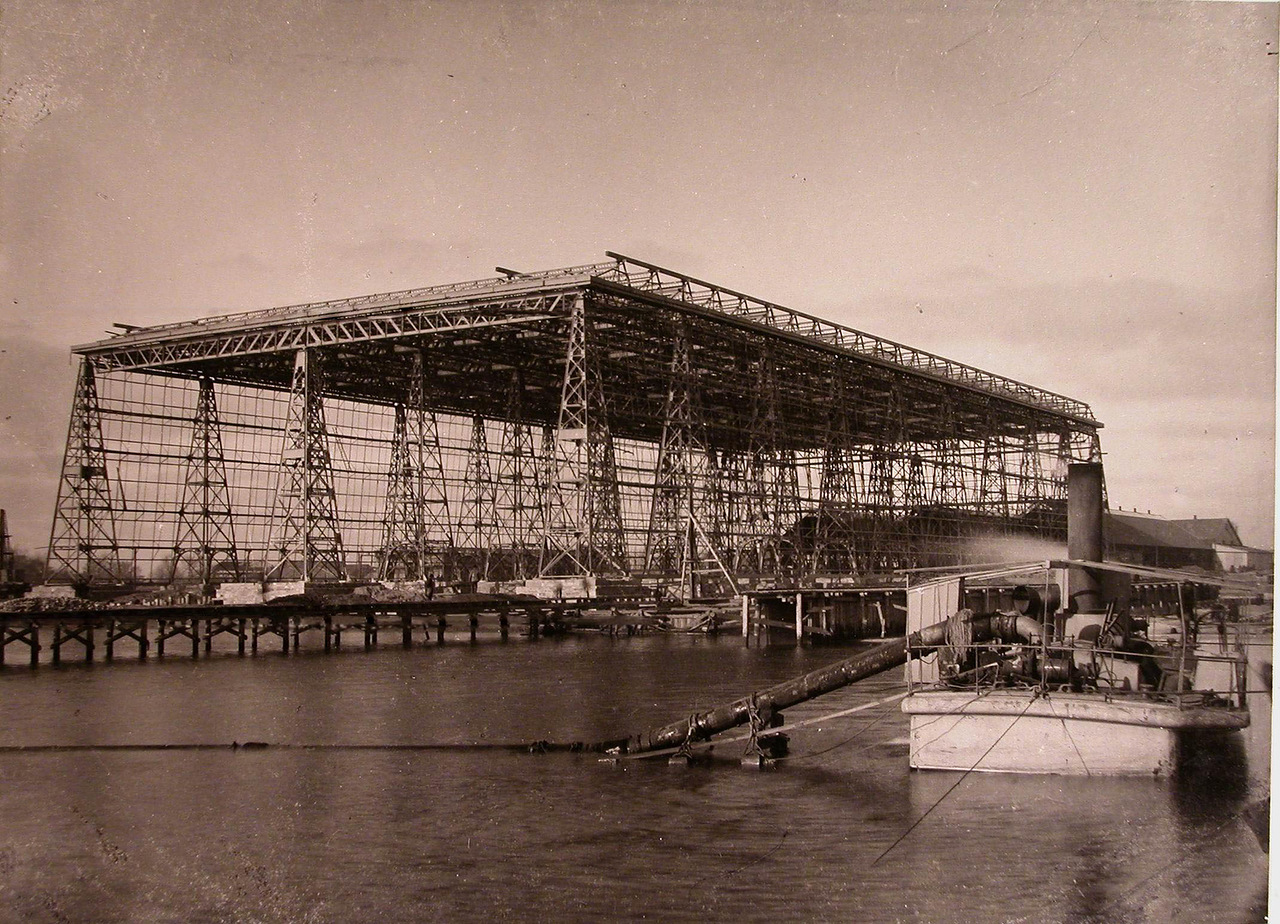
Shipbuilding dock c. 1900

The State joint stock company Chernomorsudoproekt is one of the leading ship design firms in Ukraine. The firm was founded in 1956 around the design personnel of Nikolayev shipbuilding enterprises. The enterprise has built and exported vessels to Sweden, Bulgaria, Norway, Romania, Great Britain, Germany, Portugal, Kuwait, India and Greece.

The shipyard had two main areas covering 500 acres (2.0 km^{2}). The first slipway (No. 0) had end-launch building ways and blocking docks. The second was a horizontal building slip (No. 1) with a covered launch.

	Length	Width	Lifting Capacity
Slipway No. 0	330 meters (1,080 ft)	40 meters (130 ft)	Two Kone(cranes) gantry cranes each capable of lifting up to 900 800 tons
Slipway No. 1	400 meters (1,300 ft)	18 meters (59 ft)	Horizontal, launching effected with the help of floating dock
Floating dock	120 meters (390 ft)	41.5 meters (136 ft)	Up to 7,500 tons
3 quays	860 meters (2,820 ft) total	-	Portal cranes with a lifting capacity of 25-40 tons

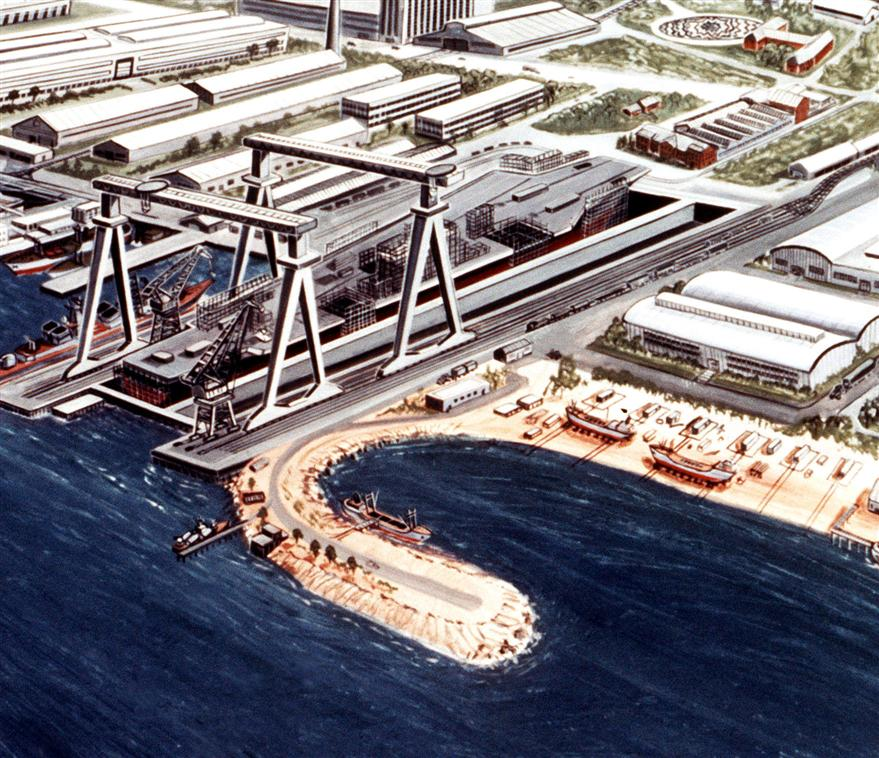
An artist's impression of the aircraft carrier Ulyanovsk under construction

The largest slipway (No.0) was capable of constructing tankers, bulk carriers, supply vessels, and roll-on/roll-off ships. There was also a high-capacity pre-slipway area of 14,000 square meters (150,000 sq ft), where blocks up to 1,500 metric tons (1,500 long tons; 1,700 short tons) could be assembled.

The second slipway (No.1) was a flow-position line, located in the sheltered slipway and was actually a closed-loop autonomous production line. Launching of vessels was effected with the help of the floating dock. The final fitting-out was performed near the South outfitting quay which was 546 meters (1,791 ft).

The shipyard consisted of several workshops to include: the slipway workshop, assembly and welding workshop, plating workshop, and an outfitting workshop. The assembly and welding workshop was capable of manufacturing flat and volumetric sections up to 180 metric tons (180 long tons; 200 short tons).

According to their public website, the shipyard also included:

- Specialized services to include the manufacturing of propeller shafts with length up to 30 meters (98 ft) and the manufacturing of unit-cast and welded anchor chains.
- A multi-branch network of 43 kilometers (27 mi) of railways and 29 kilometers (18 mi) of roads.
- Tug boats capable of 60 ton bollard pull which can provide escort services to tankers up to 70,000 DWT in the narrow waters.

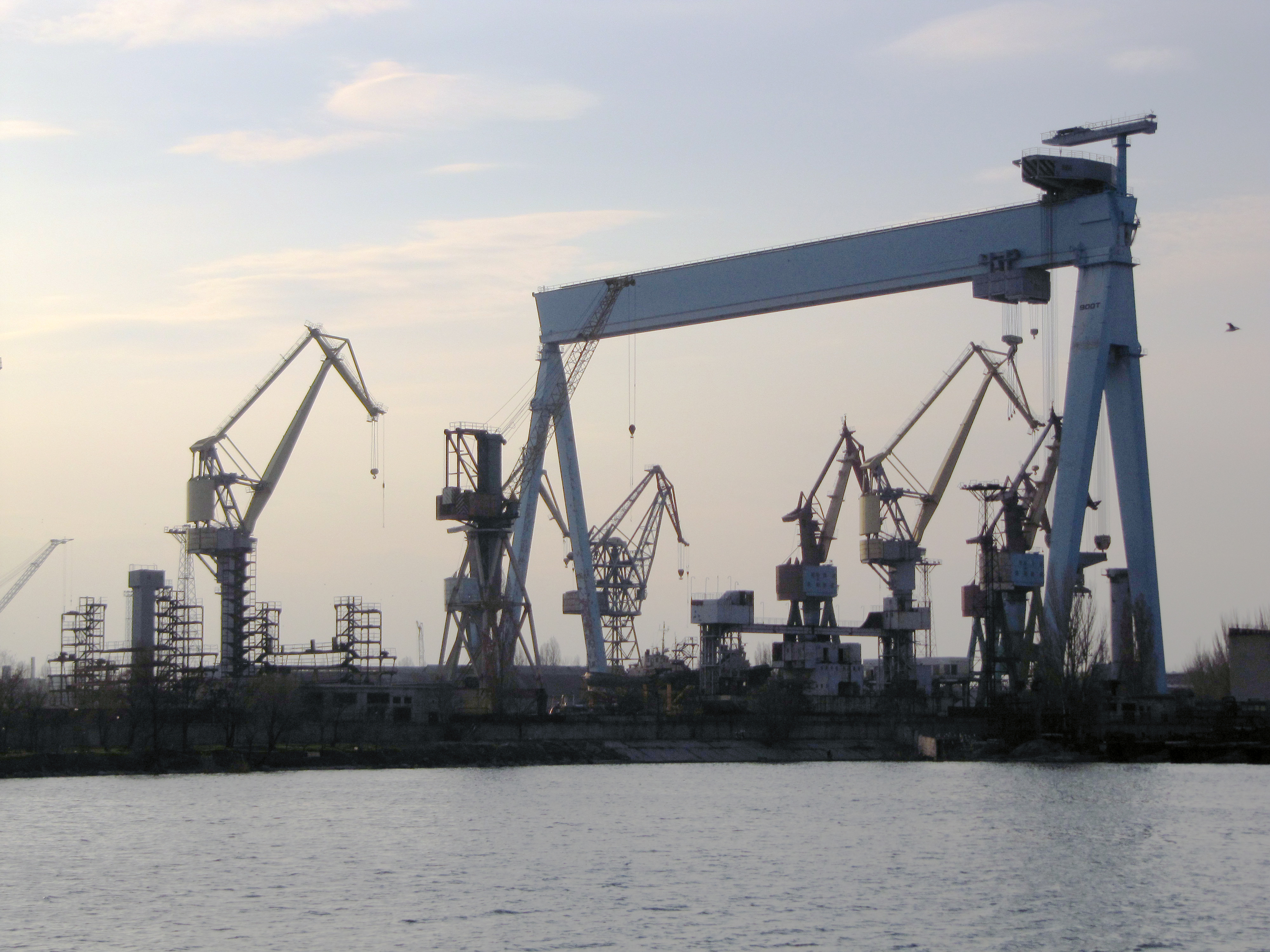
Cranes in the shipyard in 2010

As of 2008 the shipyard was a major enterprise consisting of shipbuilding, machine-building, and metallurgy. The shipyard had its own design center with a qualified engineering staff and modern computer equipment. Their integrated shipbuilding system (FORAN) included computer-aided design (CAD), engineering (CAE), and manufacturing (CAM) of vessels.

== Vessels ==
Vessels constructed in this shipyard were numerous. The table below lists many of these vessels to include when they were laid and launched.

Notable vessels Imperial Russian Navy (1696–1917) • Soviet Navy (1917–1991)
Name	Laid down	Launched	Class (NATO)	Type
Krab	1908?	1912	-	Submarine minelayer
Imperatritsa Ekaterina Velikaya	1911	1914	Imperatritsa Mariya	Battleship
Bespokoiny	1912	1913	Derzky	Destroyer
Gnevny	1912	1913	Derzky	Destroyer
Derzky	1913	1914	Derzky	Destroyer
Pronzitelny	1913	1914	Derzky	Destroyer
Imperator Nikolai I	1915	1916	Imperator Nikolai I	Battleship
Fidonisy	1915	1916	Fidonisy	Destroyer
Gadzhibey	1915	1916	Fidonisy	Destroyer
Kaliakria	1915	1916	Fidonisy	Destroyer
Kerch	1915	1916	Fidonisy	Destroyer
Korfu	1916	1917	Fidonisy	Destroyer
Levkas	1916	1917	Fidonisy	Destroyer
Tserigo	1915	1916	Fidonisy	Destroyer
Zante	1916	1917	Fidonisy	Destroyer
Revolutsioner	1927	1929	Dekabrist	Submarine
Spartakovets	1927	1929	Dekabrist	Submarine
Yakobinets	1927	1929	Dekabrist	Submarine
Kharkov	1932	1934	Leningrad (Project 1)	Destroyer Leader
Moskva	1932	1934	Leningrad (Project 1)	Destroyer Leader
Bodry	1935	1936	Gnevnyy	Destroyer
Boyky	1935	1936	Gnevnyy	Destroyer
Bystry	1936	1936	Gnevnyy	Destroyer
Besposhchadny	1936	1936	Gnevnyy	Destroyer
Voroshilov	1936	1939	Kirov (Project 26)	Light cruiser
Molotov	1937	1939	Kirov (Project 26bis)	Light cruiser
Sovetskaya Ukraina	1938	Destroyed	Sovetskiy Soyuz (Project 23)	Battleship
Kiev	1931	1941	Kiev (Project 48)	Destroyer Leader
Erevan	1931	1941	Kiev (Project 48)	Destroyer Leader
Kuybyshev	1939	1950	Chapayev (Project 68)	Light cruiser
Frunze	1939	1950	Chapayev (Project 68)	Light cruiser
Dzerzhinsky	1948	1950	Sverdlov (Project 68bis)	Light cruiser
Stalingrad	1949	Cancelled	Stalingrad (Project 82)	Battlecruiser
Admiral Nakhimov	1950	1951	Sverdlov (Project 68bis)	Light cruiser
Mikhail Kutuzov	1951	1952	Sverdlov (Project 68bis)	Light cruiser
Admiral Kornilov	1951	1954	Sverdlov (Project 68bis)	Light cruiser
Moskva	1962	1965	Moskva (CVHG)	Helicopter carrier
Leningrad	1962	1965	Moskva (CVHG)	Helicopter carrier
Akademik Sergei Korolev	?	1970	Korolev	Space Control-Monitoring
Kiev	1970	1972	Kiev	Aircraft carrier
Minsk	1972	1975	Kiev	Aircraft carrier
Novorossiysk	1975	1978	Kiev	Aircraft carrier
Admiral Gorshkov	1978	1982	Kiev	Aircraft carrier
Admiral of the Fleet of the Soviet Union N.G. Kuznetsov	1983	1985	Kuznetsov	Aircraft carrier
Varyag	1985	1988	Kuznetsov	Aircraft carrier
Ulyanovsk	1988	Cancelled	Ulyanovsk	Aircraft carrier

Notes: NATO class only shown if applicable; classes of vessels launched before 1949 are provided as originally designated. Most vessel names provided is the name given when launched–some ships may have since been renamed.

== See also ==
- List of ships of Russia by project number
- List of Soviet and Russian submarine classes
- Admiral Makarov National University of Shipbuilding

== Bibliography ==
- Breyer, Siegfried (1992). Soviet Warship Development: Volume 1: 1917-1937. London: Conway Maritime Press. ISBN 0-85177-604-3.
- Harrison, Mark; Cooper, Julian; Dexter, Keith; Rodionov, Ivan (2003). The Numbered Factories and Other Establishments of the Soviet Defence Industry Complex, 1927 to 1968, Part I, Factories & Shipyards (Version 8 ed.). Warwick, UK: University of Warwick, Department of Economics.
- Polmar, Norman (1983). Guide to the Soviet Navy (3rd ed.). Annapolis, Maryland: Naval Institute Press. ISBN 0-87021-239-7.
- Polmar, Norman & Noot, Jurrien (1991). Submarines of the Russian and Soviet Navies, 1718–1990. Annapolis, Maryland: Naval Institute Press. ISBN 0-87021-570-1.
