= Soviet destroyer Dzerzhinsky =

Destroyer of the Soviet Navy

Coordinates: 44°18′N 33°04′E

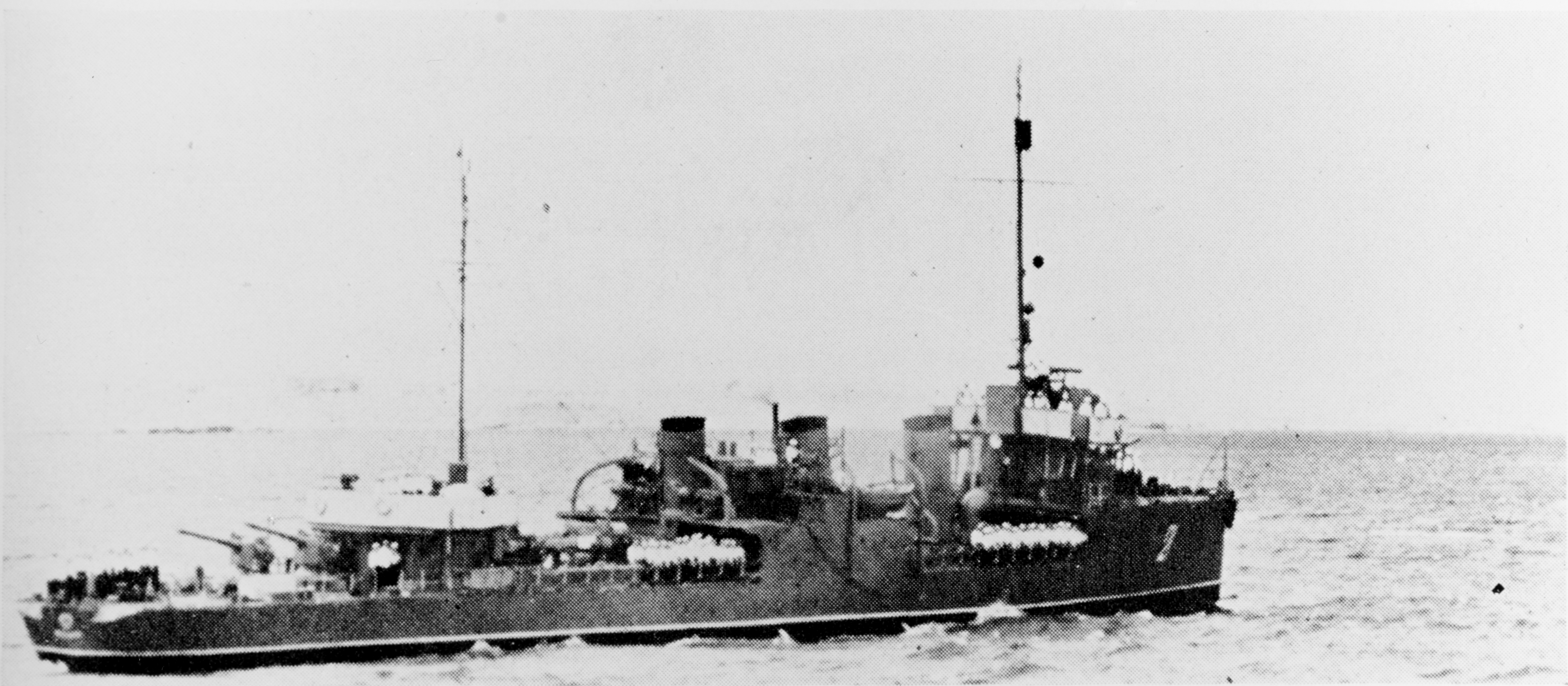
- A postwar view of sister ship Zheleznyakov

History

Russian Empire
- Name: Kaliakria (Калиакрия)
- Namesake: Battle of Cape Kaliakra
- Ordered: 17 March 1915
- Builder: Naval Shipyard, Nikolayev
- Laid down: 29 October 1915
- Launched: 14 August 1916
- Commissioned: 30 October 1917
- Fate: Joined the Bolsheviks, 16 December 1918

Soviet Union
- Namesake: Felix Dzerzhinsky
- Acquired: 16 December 1918
- Commissioned: 28 August 1929
- Renamed: Dzerzhinsky (Дзержинский), 24 November 1926
- Fate: Scuttled, 18 June 1918; Refloated, 4 October 1925; Sunk, 13 May 1942

General characteristics
- Class & type: Fidonisy-class destroyer
- Displacement: 1,460 long tons (1,480 t) (normal); 1,780 long tons (1,810 t) (full load)
- Length: 93.26 m (306 ft 0 in)
- Beam: 9.05 m (29 ft 8 in)
- Draft: 3.2 m (10 ft 6 in)
- Installed power: 5 Thornycroft boilers; 29,000 shp (22,000 kW)
- Propulsion: 2 shafts; 2 steam turbines
- Speed: 33 knots (61 km/h; 38 mph)
- Range: 1,450 nmi (2,690 km; 1,670 mi) at 16 knots (30 km/h; 18 mph)
- Complement: 136
- Armament: 4 × single 102 mm (4 in) guns; 2 × single 57 mm (2.2 in) AA guns; 4 × single 7.62 mm (0.3 in) machine guns; 4 × triple 450 mm (17.7 in) torpedo tubes; 80 mines

Dzerzhinsky (Дзержинский) was one of eight Fidonisy-class destroyers built for the Imperial Russian Navy during World War I. She was originally named Kaliakria (Калиакрия) before she was renamed Dzerzhinsky in 1926.

== Design and description ==
The Fidonisy-class ships were designed as an improved version of the Derzky class with an additional 102-millimeter (4 in) gun. Kaliakria displaced 1,326 long tons (1,347 t) normal and 1,580 long tons (1,610 t) at full load with an overall length of 93.26 meters (306 ft 0 in), a beam of 9.05 meters (29 ft 8 in), and a draft of 3.2 meters (10 ft 6 in) at full load. She was propelled by two Parsons steam turbines, each driving one propeller, designed to produce a total of 29,000 shaft horsepower (22,000 kW) using steam from five 3-drum Thorneycroft boilers for an intended maximum speed of 33 knots (61 km/h; 38 mph). Kaliakria was designed to carry enough fuel oil to give her a range of 1,450 nautical miles (2,690 km; 1,670 mi) at 16 knots (30 km/h; 18 mph). Her crew numbered 136.

The Fidonisy-class ships mounted a main armament of four single 102 mm Pattern 1911 Obukhov guns, one on the forecastle and three aft; one of these latter guns was superfiring over the other two. Unhappy with the reliability of the 40-millimeter (1.6 in) anti-aircraft gun originally intended to equip Kaliakria, the navy replaced them with a pair of 57-millimeter (2.2 in) Hotchkiss guns while the ship was still under construction in March 1917, and four 7.62-millimeter (0.3 in) Maxim machine guns. The destroyers mounted four triple 450-millimeter (17.7 in) torpedo tube mounts amidships with fourteen torpedoes and could carry 80 M1908 naval mines. They were also fitted with a Barr and Stroud rangefinder and two 60-centimeter (24 in) searchlights.

== Construction and service ==
Dzerzhinsky transported a Soviet delegation headed by Deputy People's Commissar of Foreign Affairs Lev Karakhan to Istanbul for negotiations with the Turkish government on 11 December 1929. She returned to Sevastopol with the delegation aboard on 24 December after the latter signed a protocol renewing the 1925 Soviet–Turkish Treaty on Friendship and Neutrality.

=== World War II ===
Dzerzhinsky was part of the 1st Destroyer Division of the fleet at Batumi along with Frunze by 22 June 1941, when the Germans invaded the Soviet Union. Between 22 and 25 June she laid 240 mines off the Batumi Naval Base in four night sorties. With her sisters, she was sent to support the defenders during the Siege of Odessa due to a fleet prohibition on using large ships after the Raid on Constanța that was in effect until August, forcing the elderly Noviks to be employed. Dzerzhinsky arrived in Odessa on 20 August with a cargo of ammunition, and on the next day bombarded Dofinovka, firing 88 102 mm shells. On the thirteenth volley the elevator of one turret failed and it had to be reloaded by hand. She was attacked without result by three Heinkel He 111 bombers, one of many air attacks on the Soviet ships supporting Odessa. The destroyer escorted three transports out of Odessa on 23 August, and departed Sevastopol on 29 August escorting three transports, together with two minesweepers and three torpedo boats. Arriving at Odessa on the next day, she bombarded Fontanka, expending 200 shells. While engaged in this duty, the destroyer was attacked several times by Axis aircraft without result. After maneuvering in the Gulf of Odessa during the night, Dzerzhinsky expanded another 118 shells against Fontanka and other Axis positions during the next day, and left Odessa that night with a tugboat that towed two barges. The slow speed of the latter forced the destroyer to travel at 6 knots (11 km/h; 6.9 mph), delaying her return to Sevastopol until 2 September.

Dzerzhinsky departed Sevastopol for Odessa on 6 September with a 140-man partisan detachment aboard. Arriving the next day, she found the port under Axis artillery fire. In the evening she expended 56 shells against coastal targets and maneuvered at sea during the night. Another 90 shells were fired against coastal targets on the next morning, and she continued maneuvering that day despite the failure of a turbogenerator. Early on 9 September, she entered Odessa to replenish her supplies of fuel and potable water, but fragments from near misses of artillery shells damaged a gun and her torpedo tubes. As there was no fuel in the port, Dzerzhinsky departed under her own smokescreen and fired a volley at an Axis battery. She spent the rest of the day maneuvering off the Vorontsov Lighthouse and departed that night, escorting a transport evacuating the wounded together with a minesweeper. The destroyer arrived at Sevastopol on 10 September, almost out of fuel and having no potable water remaining.

As the situation worsened in Odessa, People's Commissar of the Navy Admiral Nikolai Kuznetsov ordered an amphibious landing at Grigorievka near the port to restore the situation. Dzerzhinsky and Frunze were assigned as part of a detachment to support the operation, and on 16 September both destroyers attempted to carry out a rehearsal at the Chersonese Lighthouse, but failed due to heavy seas. On the same day, Dzerzhinsky was dropped from the detachment and instead sent to support the defenders of the Isthmus of Perekop against the German advance. Departing Sevastopol for Karkinit Bay on 17 September, she expended 206 shells that day against Alekseyevka, Khorly, and Skadovsk before returning to Sevastopol, exceeding the planned 150 shells. The bombardment was conducted despite a burst pipes in one boiler and a broken gyrocompass, but the destroyer wore out her gun barrels and was replaced by the cruiser Voroshilov on the bombardment mission.

Between October and February 1942 Dzerzhinsky was under refit at Poti, which took four and a half months. Returning to service in March, she escorted the gunboat Krasnaya Kuban from Poti to Sevastopol between 21 and 24 March during the Siege of Sevastopol. Both returned to the Caucasus coast on 28 March, and on the next day the destroyer expended six depth charges against a suspected submarine. Between 4 and 11 April, she escorted the tanker I. Stalin from Batumi to Sevastopol via Tuapse. Anchored in Sevastopol between 12 and 13 April, the destroyer bombarded a German troop concentration near Mamashay. She departed on 13 April as an escort for the tanker Moskva and returned to Batumi two days later. Dzerzhinsky and the destroyer Boyky escorted the battleship Parizhskaya Kommuna on 19 April while the latter tested her main armament and maneuverability following repairs.

Together with the cruiser Krasny Krym and her sister Nezamozhnik, Dzerzhinsky loaded reinforcements for Sevastopol at Novorossiysk on 12 May and departed for another run to the besieged port. They approached the entrance to Sevastopol channel in fog on the night of 13–14 May, and remained there to await improved visibility conditions as they had to pass through a Soviet minefield to enter the port. At 11:32 on 14 May, she was ordered to search for the minesweeper marking the cleared lane by the detachment commander, who believed that the ships were too close to the minefield. Dzerzhinsky headed north without deploying paravanes, and soon sighted the minesweeper, turning towards it. Before reaching the minesweeper, she struck a mine at 12:20 and sank quickly. Of the 170 crewmembers and 125 passengers, only 27 were rescued, including her captain. The destroyer was struck from the Soviet Navy on 24 June. In 2006, a Ukrainian-American team discovered her wreck.

== Bibliography ==
- Apalkov, Yu. V. (1996). Боевые корабли Русского флота 8.1914–10.1917 гг. Справочник [Directory of Russian Navy Warships, August 1914 – October 1917] (in Russian). St. Petersburg: Intek. ISBN 5-7559-0018-3.
- Berezhnoy, Sergey (2002). Крейсера и миноносцы. Справочник [Guide to Cruisers and Destroyers] (in Russian). Moscow: Voenizdat. ISBN 5-203-01780-8.
- Breyer, Siegfried (1992). Soviet Warship Development: Volume 1: 1917–1937. London: Conway Maritime Press. ISBN 0-85177-604-3.
- Budzbon, Przemysław (1985). "Russia". In Gray, Randal (ed.). Conway's All the World's Fighting Ships 1906–1921. Annapolis, Maryland: Naval Institute Press. pp. 291–325. ISBN 0-85177-245-5.
- Chernyshev, Alexander (2011). Русские суперэсминцы. Легендарные "Новики" [Russian Superdestroyers: Legendary Noviks] (in Russian) (2nd ed.). Moscow: Yauza/Eksmo. ISBN 978-5-699-53144-8.
- Hasanli, Jamil (2011). Stalin and the Turkish Crisis of the Cold War, 1945–1953. Lanham, Maryland: Lexington Books. ISBN 9780739168080.
- Hill, Alexander (2018). Soviet Destroyers of World War II. New Vanguard. Vol. 256. Oxford, UK: Osprey Publishing. ISBN 978-1-4728-2256-7.
- Likachev, Pavel Vladimirovich (2005). Эскадренные миноносцы типа «Новик» в ВМФ СССР 1920-1955 гг [Novik-class Destroyers in the Soviet Navy 1920-1955] (in Russian). Samara, Russia: ISTFLOT. ISBN 5-98830-009-X.
- Platonov, Andrey V. (2002). Энциклопедия советских надводных кораблей 1941–1945 [Encyclopedia of Soviet Surface Ships 1941–1945] (in Russian). Saint Petersburg: Poligon. ISBN 5-89173-178-9.
- Rohwer, Jürgen (2005). Chronology of the War at Sea 1939–1945: The Naval History of World War Two (Third Revised ed.). Annapolis, Maryland: Naval Institute Press. ISBN 1-59114-119-2.
- Verstyuk, Anatoly & Gordeyev, Stanislav (2006). Корабли Минных дивизий. От "Новика" до "Гогланда" [Torpedo Division Ships: From Novik to Gogland] (in Russian). Moscow: Voennaya Kniga. ISBN 5-902863-10-4.
- Yakubov, Vladimir & Worth, Richard (2008). Raising the Red Banner: A Pictorial History of Stalin's Fleet. Gloucestershire, UK: Spellmount. ISBN 978-1-86227-450-1.
