= Soviet destroyer Nezamozhnik =

Russian Fidonisy-class destroyer

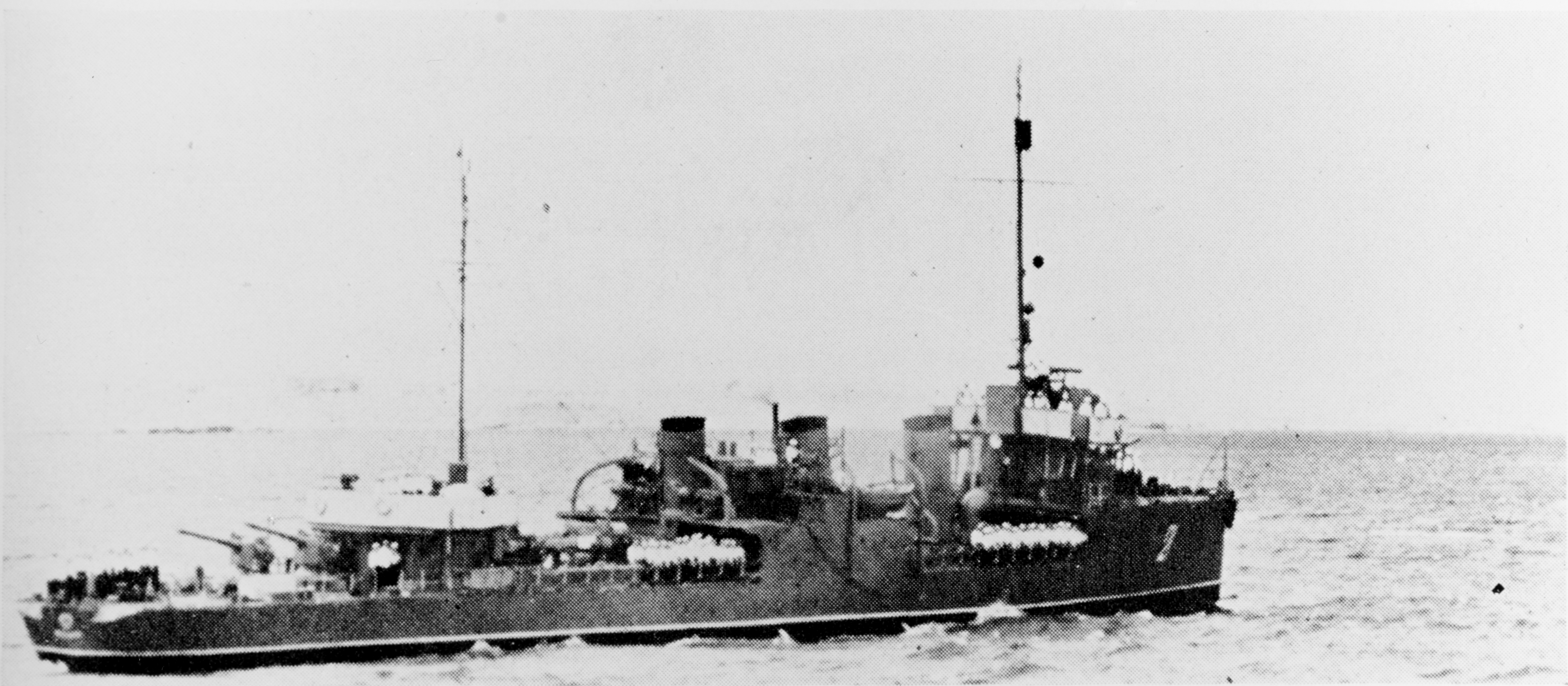
- A postwar view of sister ship Zheleznyakov

History

Russian Empire
- Name: Zante (Занте)
- Namesake: Russian capture of Zakynthos
- Ordered: 30 March [O.S. 17 March] 1915
- Builder: Russud Shipyard, Nikolayev
- Laid down: May 1916
- Launched: 3 April [O.S. 21 March] 1917
- Fate: Shipyard captured by Austro-German forces, March 1918; Claimed by the Ukrainian People's Republic, 1918

Armed Forces of South Russia
- Name: Zante
- Captured: July 1919
- Fate: Wrecked in storm, February 1920

Soviet Union
- Acquired: 1922 (raised September 1920)
- Commissioned: 7 November 1923
- Renamed: Nezamozhny (Незаможный), 12 June 1923; Nezamozhnik (Незаможник), 29 April 1926
- Reclassified: As a target ship, 1949
- Honours and awards: Order of the Red Banner
- Fate: Sunk, early 1950s

General characteristics (as built)
- Class & type: Fidonisy-class destroyer
- Displacement: 1,350 long tons (1,370 t) (standard); 1,745 long tons (1,773 t) (full load)
- Length: 92.75 m (304 ft 4 in)
- Beam: 9.07 m (29 ft 9 in)
- Draft: 3.81 m (12 ft 6 in)
- Installed power: 5 Thornycroft boilers; 29,000 shp (22,000 kW)
- Propulsion: 2 shafts; 2 steam turbines
- Speed: 27.5 knots (50.9 km/h; 31.6 mph)
- Range: 1,560 nmi (2,890 km; 1,800 mi) at 18.5 knots (34.3 km/h; 21.3 mph)
- Complement: 137
- Armament: 4 × single 102 mm (4 in) guns; 1 × single 76 mm (3 in) AA gun; 1 × single 37 mm (1.5 in) AA gun; 4 × single 7.62 mm (0.3 in) machine guns; 4 × triple 450 mm (17.7 in) torpedo tubes; 80 mines

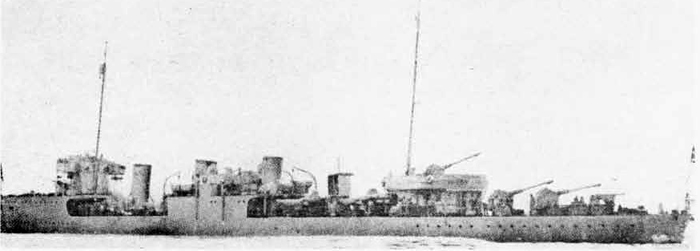
A profile view of sister ship Shaumyan, showing the position of her 102 mm guns

Nezamozhnik (Russian and Ukrainian: Незаможник, Ukrainian romanization: Nezamozhnyk, lit. 'poor peasant') was one of eight Fidonisy-class destroyers built for the Imperial Russian Navy during World War I. Originally named Zante (Занте), the ship was left unfinished during the Russian Revolution in 1917 and later captured by Ukrainian and White forces. The mostly complete destroyer was towed from her shipyard by retreating White forces and wrecked during a storm in 1920. She was refloated by the Soviets following their victory in the Russian Civil War and completed in 1923 as Nezamozhny (Незаможный).

Serving with the Black Sea Fleet, she was renamed Nezamozhnik and made several international port visits. Refitted twice during the interwar period, the destroyer served in the Black Sea during World War II, helping to evacuate Odessa, supply besieged Soviet forces in Sevastopol, and support several amphibious operations during the Kerch–Feodosia Offensive and the Battle of the Caucasus. The ship saw no combat after October 1943 after three destroyers were sunk by German aircraft in a single action. She received the Order of the Red Banner for her actions during the war. Nezamozhnik was converted into a target ship at the end of the 1940s and sunk during the early 1950s.

== Design and description ==
In early 1914, several months before World War I, the Naval Ministry proposed the construction of a third series of eight destroyers, based on Novik, for the Black Sea Fleet. These ships were to be built in response to a perceived strengthening of the Ottoman Navy. This was approved by Nicholas II on 7 July [O.S. 24 June] 1914 after the destroyers had received names on 29 July [O.S. 16 June] in honor of the victories of Russian Admiral Fyodor Ushakov. Among these was Zante, the Italian name for Zakynthos, named in honor of Ushakov's 1798–1799 campaign in the Ionian Islands. The eight destroyers were ordered on 30 March [O.S. 17 March] 1915 when the Naval Ministry concluded a contract with the Society of Nikolayev Factories and Shipyards for construction at a cost of 2.2 million rubles each.

As a Fidonisy-class destroyer, Zante displaced 1,350 long tons (1,370 t) at standard load and 1,745 long tons (1,773 t) at full load by 1943 with an overall length of 92.75 meters (304 ft 4 in), a beam of 9.07 meters (29 ft 9 in), and a draft of 3.81 meters (12 ft 6 in). She was propelled by two Parsons steam turbines, each driving one propeller, designed to produce a total of 29,000 shaft horsepower (22,000 kW) using steam from five 3-drum Thornycroft boilers for an intended maximum speed of 33 knots (61 km/h; 38 mph). During her sea trials, the ship reached a speed of 27.5 knots (50.9 km/h; 31.6 mph) from 22,496 shp (16,775 kW). Her crew initially numbered 137, but after 1941 increased to 172. The ship carried enough fuel oil to give her a range of 1,560 nautical miles (2,890 km; 1,800 mi) at 18.5 knots (34.3 km/h; 21.3 mph).

As built, the Fidonisy-class ships mounted a main armament of four single 102-millimeter (4 in) Pattern 1911 Obukhov guns, one on the forecastle and three aft; one of these latter guns was superfiring over the other two. Anti-aircraft (AA) defense for Nezamozhnik and her sisters that were completed after the war was provided by a single 76.2-millimeter (3 in) Lender gun on the stern, a 37-millimeter (1.5 in) Maxim cannon, and four 7.62-millimeter (0.3 in) M-1 machine guns. The destroyers mounted four triple above-water 450-millimeter (17.7 in) torpedo tube mounts amidships with a pair of reload torpedoes and could carry 80 M1908 naval mines. The destroyer was also fitted with a Barr and Stroud rangefinder and two 60-centimeter (24 in) searchlights.

=== Modifications ===
A second 76.2 mm gun was added on the stern during her 1928–1929 refit and she was equipped to carry 60 M1926 mines. During her 1935–1936 refit, the destroyer received four 12.7-millimeter (0.5 in) DShK machine guns on the forward and aft bridges, replacing the 7.62 mm machine guns, in addition to an AM-3 rangefinder. In mid-1941 her anti-aircraft armament was again modernized with the addition of two 45-millimeter (1.8 in) 21-K AA guns on the forecastle. By 1943 five 37 mm 70-K AA guns had been added with one between the funnels and four among the boats, in addition to two Oerlikon 20-millimeter (0.79 in) cannons on the aft bridge. These replaced two of the DShKs, while the other two DShKs remained on the forward bridge wings. During the 1930s, she was also fitted with 42 depth charges and two K-1 paravanes. A pair of depth-charge throwers were added later.

== Construction and service ==
After being added to the Black Sea Fleet ship list on 15 July [O.S. 2 July] 1915, Zante was laid down in the Russud Shipyard in Nikolayev during May 1916 and launched on 3 April [O.S. 21 March] 1917. Her construction was halted after the Russian Revolution along with three of her sisters. On 17 March 1918 the shipyard was occupied by Austro-German forces, followed by the Ukrainian People's Army and lastly the White Armed Forces of South Russia in July 1919. A White commission concluded that Zante's hull was 70 percent complete and her machinery 85 percent complete, with all boilers, the forward turbine, and most auxiliary equipment installed, in addition to two torpedo tube mounts. Despite this, work was not resumed, and the incomplete destroyer was towed to Odessa by the Whites in January 1920 as the Red Army approached Nikolayev, where in early February a storm wrecked her on the rocks at Bolshoy Fontan during the White evacuation from Odessa. The submerged ship was raised by the Soviet government and returned to Nikolayev on 7 September 1920 for completion.

The Main Maritime Technical Directorate and the Supreme Soviet of the National Economy concluded an agreement for her completion at Nikolayev's Andrei Marti yard on 23 December. The destroyer was completed with a design virtually identical to her sisters. On 12 June 1923, the ship was renamed Nezamozhny (Russian: Незаможний, lit. 'poor peasants') in recognition of a fundraising drive by the Ukrainian Committee of Poor Peasants that had helped provide funds necessary for her completion. Presented for testing on 23 September of that year after long delays, the destroyer was sent to Sevastopol after ten days of machinery tests, where she continued trials until 14 October, when Nezamozhny returned to Nikolayev for boiler cleaning. After being accepted by the Soviet Navy on 20 October, the naval jack was hoisted aboard her on 7 November, when she became part of the Black Sea Naval Forces.

=== Interwar period ===
Shortly after her completion, Nezamozhny participated in the first Black Sea Naval Forces maneuvers, with Revolutionary Military Council Chairman Leon Trotsky sailing to Batumi aboard her. She was also involved in the 1924 fleet maneuvers between 6 and 11 September. In September and October 1925 Nezamozhny and her sister Petrovsky returned an Italian visit to Leningrad; departing Sevastopol on 18 September, they visited Istanbul, Turkey, then steamed through the Mediterranean to Naples, Italy, where the sailors met writer Maxim Gorky. The destroyers returned to their base on 9 October after steaming 2,709 nmi (5,017 km; 3,117 mi).

She was again renamed to Nezamozhnik (Russian: Незаможник, the singular form of her previous name) on 29 April 1926. After a refit at Sevmorzavod in Sevastopol between 1928 and 1929, the destroyer departed Sevastopol with the destroyer Frunze for another Mediterranean cruise on 31 August. After visiting Naples between 4 and 8 September, they finished the 2,840 nmi (5,260 km; 3,270 mi) cruise on 12 September. Nezamozhnik towed the submarine Shakhter to Sevastopol after the latter collided with a cargo ship on 3 April 1930.

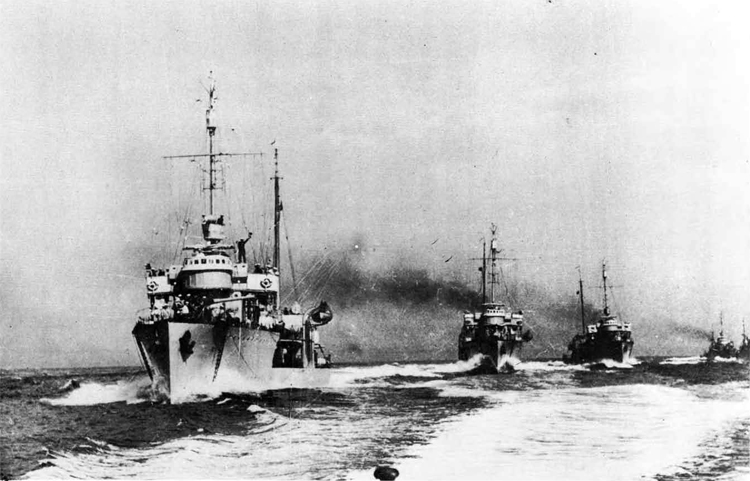
Destroyers of her class maneuvering

In October she cruised to Istanbul (3 to 5 October), Messina, Italy (7 to 10 October), and Piraeus, Greece (11 to 14 October), with the light cruiser Chervona Ukraina and her sister Shaumyan, practicing maneuvering in minefields and repelling attacks from submarines, destroyers, and torpedo boats. During March 1934 tests of the 76 mm (3-K) AA gun were conducted aboard her, but proved unsuccessful when the gun could not be traversed in heavy seas. On 11 January 1935 the Black Sea Naval Forces became the Soviet Black Sea Fleet, and from 1935 to 1936 the destroyer underwent another refit at Sevmorzavod.

=== World War II and postwar ===
==== Siege of Odessa ====
By 1941, the destroyer was part of the 1st Destroyer Division of the fleet. She was refitting until 15 July, following the start of the German invasion of the Soviet Union, Operation Barbarossa, on 22 June. With the gunboat Krasnaya Abkhaziya and three patrol boats, she escorted a floating dry dock with a capacity of 5,000 long tons (5,100 t) towed by the icebreaker Makarov and the tugboat SP-13 from Tendra to Sevastopol between 24 and 26 July during the evacuation of Nikolayev. Nezamozhnik and her sister Shaumyan were assigned to provide naval gunfire support for the defense of Odessa on 6 August – the Novik-class ships were given this mission as the Black Sea Fleet command refused to risk sending new ships within range of Axis artillery or aviation until the end of August as a result of the sinking of the new destroyer leader Moskva.

She did not arrive at the port until 13 August, when she and Shaumyan unsuccessfully attempted to prevent the Romanian encirclement of the city from the landward side with naval gunfire. Damaged by three near misses from Axis bombs on 14 August while bombarding targets off Ochakov, the destroyer spent the next four days in Odessa under repair. Returning to fire support duty off Ochakov on 20 August, Nezamozhnik covered the garrison's retreat to the islands of Berezan and Pervomaysky the next day. Between 24 and 25 August, she supported the Odessa garrison against increased Romanian attacks alongside Shaumyan and Frunze. Remaining in the roadstead there for four additional days, the destroyer bombarded Axis troop positions in the area of Alexandrovka, Gildendorf, and Voznesenka. She went into Odessa for refueling on 30 August, providing fire support from 31 August, with her commander reporting the suppression of five batteries in the Ilyichevka area, the destruction of a supply train, and the scattering of several Axis units. Departing Odessa on 4 September as the escort for the transport Dnepr, carrying a thousand wounded and four hundred passengers, she arrived in Sevastopol the next day and was repaired at Sevmorzavod between 6 September and 8 October.

Returning to Odessa on 13 October escorting three transports for the evacuation of the defenders, she provided air defense alongside her sisters. Her crew helped extinguish fires from two bomb hits aboard the transport Gruziya the following day. Exiting the port at 06:00 on 15 October, the destroyer moved into the Dofinovka Estuary to cover the retreat of the right flank of the defenders. Firing 468 102 mm shells against shore targets, Nezamozhnik was attacked in four air raids. At 20:30 she anchored two to three cable lengths from the breakwater, waiting to load troops who never arrived. The destroyer departed for Tendra at 06:00 on the next morning. With Shaumyan and Gruziya she survived a German air attack and entered Sevastopol on 17 October.

==== Siege of Sevastopol and Kerch–Feodosia operation ====
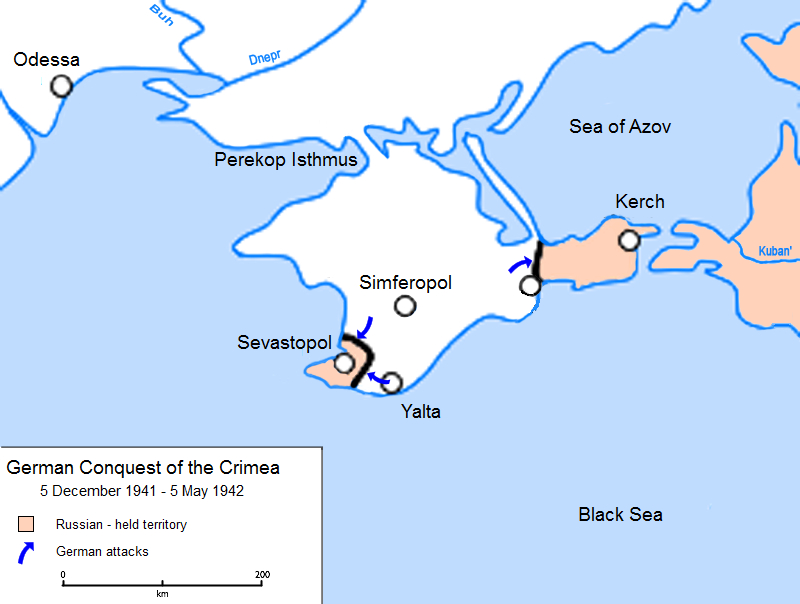
Crimea, December 1941 to May 1942

The destroyer escorted the battleship Parizhskaya Kommuna from Batumi to Poti on 2 November, and guarded it and the cruiser Voroshilov in the Poti roadstead for two days. Between 4 and 5 November, she moved from Sevastopol to Kerch, transporting the defense commander for the latter, Lieutenant General Pavel Batov. Nezamozhnik, Shaumyan, and their sister Zheleznyakov (formerly Petrovsky) were ordered to remain at Sevastopol on 7 November to support the defenses of the besieged port, but repeated German air attacks quickly forced them to depart for the Caucasus ports. She towed the unfinished destroyer Ognevoy from Sevastopol to Batumi between 8 and 11 November. Late on 12 November, the destroyer left Batumi to search for and assist the minelayer Syzran, which had run out of fuel. After escorting transports from Sevastopol to Batumi between 15 and 17 November, she and Zheleznyakov guarded Parizhskaya Kommuna in her anchorage at Poti. Departing Novorossiysk on 23 November for Sevastopol with ammunition and reinforcements, the destroyer arrived at the base on the next day and escorted the hospital ship Kotovsky back to Tuapse. There, she took a hundred wounded aboard, transporting them to Poti.

With the destroyer Boyky, Nezamozhnik escorted two transports from Poti to Sevastopol between 8 and 11 December, then fired fourteen shells at Axis positions from Severnaya Bay on 12 December. Returning to Novorossiysk between 16 and 17 December, the destroyer joined the cruisers Krasny Kavkaz and Krasnyi Krym, the destroyer leader Kharkov, and the destroyer Bodry to transport the 79th Naval Rifle Brigade to Sevastopol. They departed on 20 December, with Nezamozhnik bringing up the rear, and arrived in Sevastopol after coming under air attack at Cape Fiolent. With Krasnyi Krym, the destroyer left Sevastopol for the return voyage, firing a hundred shells in a night bombardment off Balaklava before arriving at Tuapse on 23 December.

Nezamozhnik, Shaumyan, Krasny Kavkaz, and Krasnyi Krym were assigned to support the landing near Mount Opuk during the Kerch–Feodosia Amphibious Operation in late December. With Krasny Kavkaz, she went to sea on 25 December. After the other two ships failed to meet the transports off Mount Opuk, all four ships returned to Anapa, where they found a single transport. At 17:30 on 26 December they returned to the area and maneuvered until nightfall while Krasny Kavkaz conducted a shore bombardment. The ships anchored for the night and returned to Novorossiysk on 27 December to embark troops for a landing at Feodosia, joined by Zheleznyakov. There, Nezamozhnik took aboard 289 naval infantrymen, a 76 mm gun, and seventeen boxes of shells. Early on 29 December she bombarded Feodosia, then landed troops with the other two destroyers. Despite suffering damage to her stern and flooding in a collision with the pier due to a failure of the engine order telegraph, Nezamozhnik continued the shore bombardment, which totaled 99 102 mm and 35 76 mm shells in addition to 45 mm tracer rounds. Steaming at seven to eight knots (13 to 15 km/h; 8.1 to 9.2 mph), she returned to Novorossiysk on 30 December, then to Poti on New Year's Day 1942 for repairs which were not completed until 13 March.

With Krasny Kavkaz, Nezamozhnik escorted two tankers from Poti to Sevastopol between 16 and 19 March, surviving an air attack without loss and returning to Poti. After escorting a transport from Novorossiysk to Sevastopol with Shaumyan and Kharkov between 27 and 31 March, she and two patrol boats escorted the tanker Kuybyshev from Novrossiysk to Kamysh-Burun, Kerch, on 2 April, but the destroyer ended up returning to Novorossiysk with the survivors from the tanker, which had exploded after being struck by an aerial torpedo from a German bomber. Between 3 and 7 April Nezamozhnik escorted the transport Svanetiya from Novorossiysk to Sevastopol to Tuapse and back to Novorossiysk.

Alongside Krasnyi Krym and her sister Dzerzhinsky, the destroyer loaded reinforcements at Novorossiysk on 12 May and departed for another run to Sevastopol. They approached the entrance to Sevastopol channel in fog on the night of 13–14 May, and remained there to await improved visibility conditions. While in search of a minesweeper whose position marked the Soviet defensive minefield, Dzerzhinsky struck a mine and sank with heavy loss of life on 14 May. The remaining two ships entered Sevastopol, departed with wounded on 19 May, and returned to Tuapse a day later. Nezamozhnik left for her last trip to the besieged port on 5 June, escorting Gruziya with two patrol boats, and arrived on 7 June. The destroyer departed with 94 evacuees and arrived at Tuapse two days later.

==== Later operations and fate ====
After the fall of Sevastopol, the Black Sea Fleet was reorganized, and Nezamozhnik became part of the 2nd Destroyer Division together with Zheleznyakov and the Uragan-class guard ships Shtorm and Shkval. She moved to Novorossiysk from Poti on 1 July, surviving unscathed a German air raid that sank the destroyer leader Tashkent and the destroyer Bditelny on the next day. With Shtorm and Shkval the destroyer departed the port and in the Tuapse area began escorting the light cruiser Molotov, which was transferred to Poti. She left Tuapse on 2 August to assist Molotov and Kharkov, damaged in a failed raid on Feodosia, escorting them to Poti. Four days later, the destroyer evacuated 295 government and Communist Party officials from Novorossiysk to Batumi.

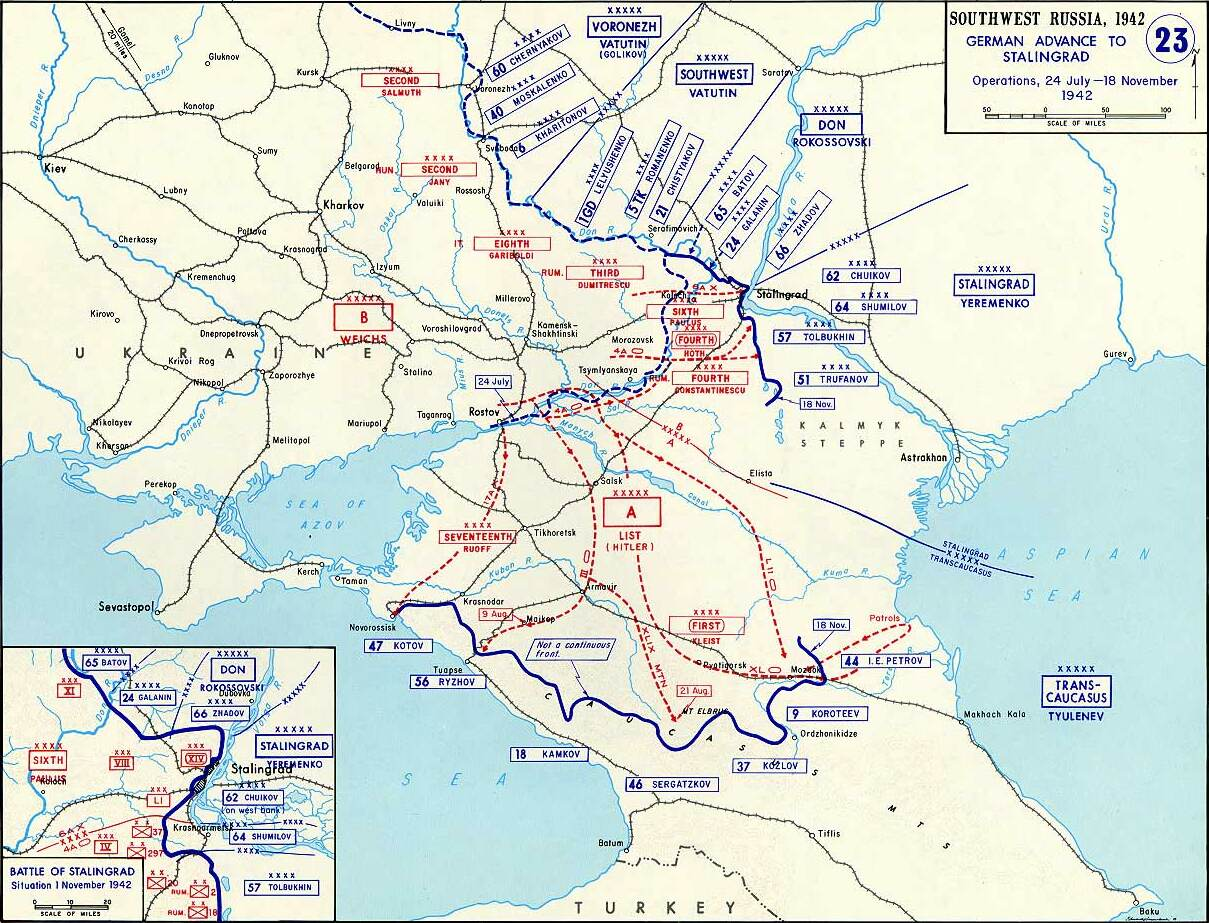
Battle of the Caucasus between July and November 1942

During the following months, Nezamozhnik served as a convoy escort, being additionally pressed into service to transport troops between bases during the Battle of the Caucasus. This began on 13 August with the transport of elements of the 32nd Guards Rifle Division from Novorossiysk to Tuapse along with Krasnyi Krym and three patrol boats. She accompanied Krasny Kavkaz on her sea trials on 17 August following the completion of her repairs, transported 500 Naval Infantry from Poti to Tuapse on 25 August, escorted the transport Kalinin, carrying troops from the 408th Rifle Division, from Poti to Tuapse on 16 September, and towed Zheleznyakov from the mouth of the Khobi River to Batumi for repairs two days later. The destroyer escorted the Kalinin between 19 and 20 September as the latter brought elements of the 328th Rifle Division from Poti to Tuapse, and on 30 September transported elements of the 408th Rifle Division from Gelendzhik to Tuapse. With Voroshilov, Boyky, and the destroyer Besposhchadny, she conducted target practice off the mouth of the Kodori River on 8 October.

The destroyer and Shkval shelled the port of Feodosia in the early hours of 14 October, assisted by two Beriev MBR-2 flying boats acting as spotter aircraft, with Nezamozhnik expending 92 high-explosive shells, which started fires in the port; she was unsuccessfully engaged by German coastal artillery. Between 18 October and 30 November she escorted two transports and tankers from Batumi and Poti to Tuapse and back, delivering 1,150 reinforcements to Tuapse. Krasnyi Krym and the destroyer brought elements of the 9th Mountain Rifle Division from Batumi to Tuapse on 2 December, and with Besposhchadny she transported 1,108 sailors detached to the army from Poti to Tuapse a week later. In the early morning hours of 20 December she and Shkval again shelled Feodosia using spotter aircraft, evading a torpedo boat attack and the fire of coastal batteries; Nezamozhnik expended 124 shells in seventeen minutes and observed fires in the port. A German motor tug was set ablaze and sunk by a direct hit.

By the beginning of 1943, the Black Sea Fleet included only six remaining destroyers, including Nezamozhnik and Zheleznyakov. She transported Chief of the Naval General Staff Admiral Ivan Isakov from Poti to Tuapse on 13 January. Three days later, she and the minesweeper Gruz escorted Kalinin from Poti to Tuapse. Under the flag of Counter Admiral Nikolay Basisty she supported the landing on 4 February in the area of Stanichka and Yuzhnaya Ozereyka together with Zheleznyakov, an attempt to recapture Novorossiysk. The two destroyers bombarded German positions in the Novorossiysk valley and at Ozereyka between 03:52 and 06:15 that morning, with Nezamozhnik expending one hundred seventy-three 102 mm shells in support of the left flank of the main landing. The main landing ran into fierce opposition and at 06:20 Basisty ordered a withdrawal to avoid German air attack, abandoning the troops that had been landed; a diversionary landing gained a beachhead that became known as Malaya Zemlya. The destroyer covered the withdrawal of the gunboats to Gelendzhik and returned to Tuapse. En route, she was attacked by five German Junkers Ju 87 dive bombers at 10:13, who missed with fifteen bombs; one plane was claimed downed by her anti-aircraft gunners.

After returning to Poti on 5 February, Nezamozhnik and two patrol boats escorted a tanker from Poti to Tuapse, delivering reinforcements and ammunition on 10 February. A shore bombardment of Anapa during which fifty shells were fired on 26 February became her last combat action, and from 1 March the destroyer was under refit, which lasted until the end of the Black Sea campaign. After the sinking of Kharkov and two destroyers in October, Stalin forbade the Black Sea Fleet cruisers and destroyers from participating in operations without his express permission. Nezamozhnik and Zheleznyakov served as part of the force escorting Krasny Kavkaz from Batumi to Poti on 15 July 1944. On 30 July, Nezamozhnik and Zheleznyakov sailed from Poti under escort from two patrol boats and nine aircraft for radar equipment tests, which proved unsatisfactory. The destroyer was transferred back to the 1st Destroyer Division on 22 August along with Zheleznyakov when the 2nd Destroyer Division was disbanded. On that day, both destroyers returned to Novorossiysk from Poti under the cover of two MBR-2s. After the port of Sevastopol was swept for mines following its recapture during the Crimean Offensive earlier that year, the Black Sea Fleet returned to Sevastopol. Nezamozhnik departed Poti on 4 November and arrived at the main base on the next day. By the end of the war, the ship was officially credited with completing 120 combat missions, sailing 45,586 nmi (84,425 km; 52,459 mi) in 3,779 running hours, surviving sixty air attacks, downing three planes, and destroying five field, two coastal, and four mortar batteries. For these actions, she was awarded the Order of the Red Banner on 8 July 1945 along with Zheleznyakov.

Disarmed and removed from the Soviet Navy on 12 January 1949, she was converted into a target ship and sunk during tests of new weaponry off the Crimean coast in the early 1950s.

== Bibliography ==
- Ammon, Georgy & Berezhnoy, Sergey (1981). Героические корабли российского и советского Военно–Морского Флота [Heroic Warships of the Russian and Soviet Navies] (in Russian). Moscow: Voenizdat. OCLC 9046897.
- Apalkov, Yu. V. (1996). Боевые корабли Русского флота 8.1914–10.1917 гг. Справочник [Directory of Russian Navy Warships, August 1914–October 1917] (in Russian). St. Petersburg: Intek. ISBN 978-5-7559-0018-8.
- Berezhnoy, Sergey (2002). Крейсера и миноносцы. Справочник [Guide to Cruisers and Destroyers] (in Russian). Moscow: Voenizdat. ISBN 978-5-203-01780-2.
- Breyer, Siegfried (1992). Soviet Warship Development: Volume 1: 1917–1937. London: Conway Maritime Press. ISBN 978-0-85177-604-0.
- Chernyshev, Alexander (2011). Русские суперэсминцы. Легендарные "Новики" [Russian Superdestroyers: Legendary Noviks] (in Russian) (2nd ed.). Moscow: Yauza/Eksmo. ISBN 978-5-699-53144-8.
- Hill, Alexander (2018). Soviet Destroyers of World War II. New Vanguard. Vol. 256. Oxford, UK: Osprey Publishing. ISBN 978-1-4728-2256-7.
- Naval General Staff (1951). Хроника Великой Отечественной войны Советского Союза на Черноморском театре [Chronicles of the Great Patriotic War of the Soviet Union in the Black Sea Theatre]. Vol. 6. Moscow: Voyenno-Morskoye Izdatelstvo. OCLC 31341499.
- Verstyuk, Anatoly & Gordeyev, Stanislav (2006). Корабли Минных дивизий. От "Новика" до "Гогланда" [Torpedo Division Ships: From Novik to Gogland] (in Russian). Moscow: Voennaya Kniga. ISBN 978-5-902863-10-6.
- United States. Office of Naval Intelligence; Germany. Kriegsmarine. War Diary of Admiral, Black Sea, 1 October 1942 - 31 December 1942. Henry E. Eccles Library U. S. Naval War College.
