= Russian destroyer Gadzhibey =

Imperial Russian Navy's Fidonisy-class destroyer

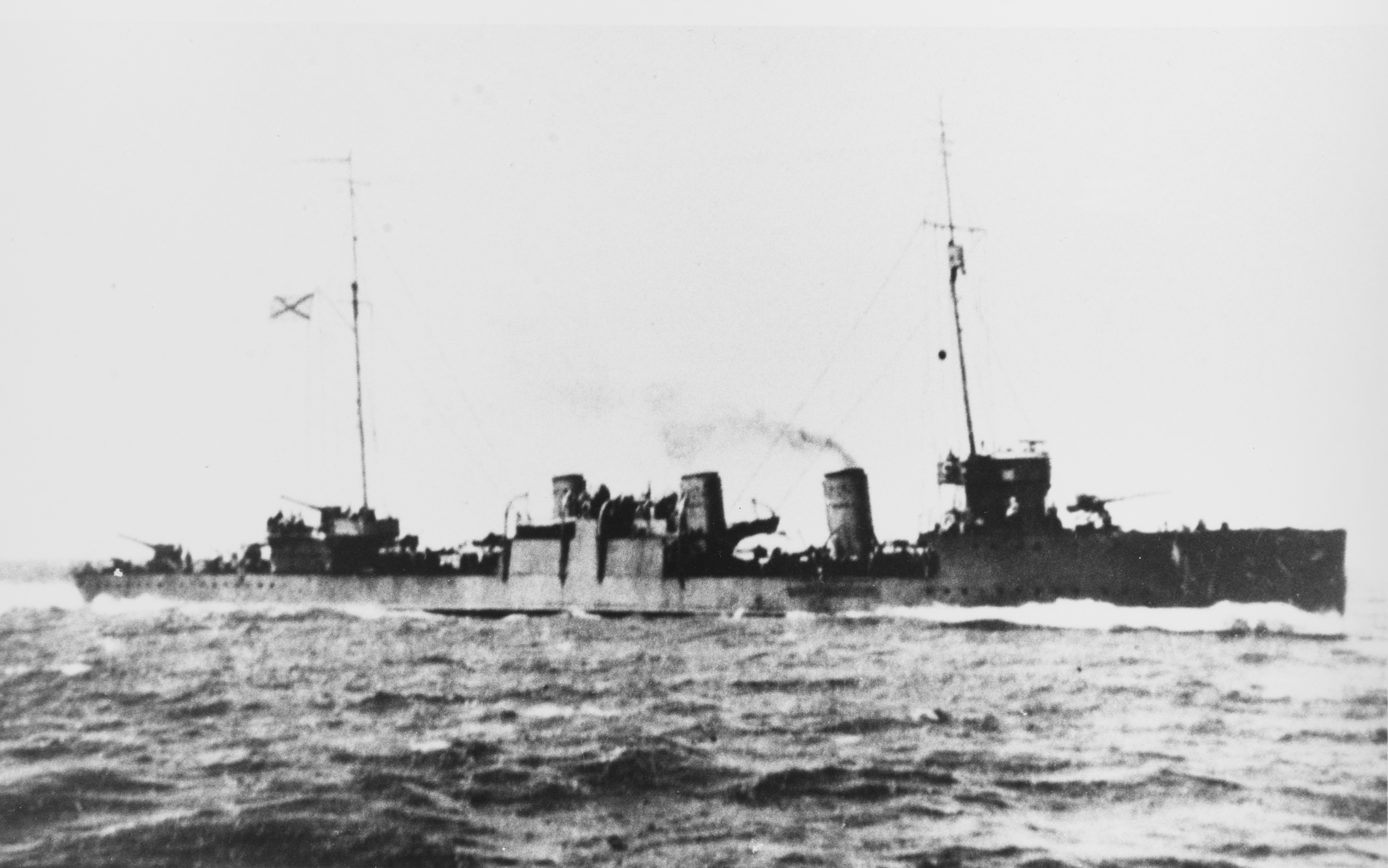
- Sister ship Fidonisy in 1917

History

Russian Empire
- Name: Gadzhibey (Гаджибей)
- Namesake: Battle of Tendra
- Ordered: 30 March [O.S. 17 March] 1915
- Builder: Admiralty Shipyard, Nikolayev
- Laid down: 11 November [O.S. 29 October] 1915
- Launched: 27 August [O.S. 14 August] 1916
- Commissioned: 24 September [O.S. 11 September] 1917
- Fate: Scuttled, 18 June 1918

General characteristics (as built)
- Class & type: Fidonisy-class destroyer
- Displacement: 1,326 long tons (1,347 t) (normal); 1,580 long tons (1,610 t) (full load)
- Length: 92.51 m (303 ft 6 in)
- Beam: 9.05 m (29 ft 8 in)
- Draft: 3.2 m (10 ft 6 in)
- Installed power: 5 Thornycroft boilers; 29,000 shp (22,000 kW)
- Propulsion: 2 shafts; 2 steam turbines
- Speed: 30 knots (56 km/h; 35 mph)
- Range: 1,500 nmi (2,800 km; 1,700 mi) at 20 knots (37 km/h; 23 mph)
- Complement: 136
- Armament: 4 × single 102 mm (4 in) guns; 2 × single 57 mm (2.2 in) AA guns; 4 × single 7.62 mm (0.3 in) machine guns; 4 × triple 450 mm (17.7 in) torpedo tubes; 80 mines

Gadzhibey (Гаджибей) was one of eight Fidonisy-class destroyers built for the Imperial Russian Navy during World War I, named after the fortress of Khadjibey.

Completed in late 1917, too late to see active service during the war, Gadzhibey's sailors joined the Bolsheviks after the October Revolution. In early 1918, the destroyer assisted in the consolidation of Soviet control over Crimea, fighting against Crimean Tatar forces at Yalta and Alushta. After the German-Ukrainian invasion of Crimea, she was withdrawn to Novorossiysk and scuttled there in June to avoid capture by German forces. Raised by the Soviet Union in the late 1920s, Gadzhibey was deemed uneconomical to repair and scrapped. Her propulsion machinery was used to refit a sister ship.

== Design and description ==
The Fidonisy-class ships were designed as an improved version of the Derzky class with an additional 102-millimeter (4 in) gun. Gadzhibey displaced 1,326 long tons (1,347 t) normal and 1,580 long tons (1,610 t) at full load with an overall length of 92.51 meters (303 ft 6 in), a beam of 9.05 meters (29 ft 8 in), and a draft of 3.2 meters (10 ft 6 in) at full load. She was propelled by two Parsons steam turbines, each driving one propeller, designed to produce a total of 29,000 shaft horsepower (22,000 kW) using steam from five 3-drum Thorneycroft boilers for an intended maximum speed of 30 knots (56 km/h; 35 mph). During her sea trials, the ship reached a speed of 31 knots (57 km/h; 36 mph) from 28,557 shp (21,295 kW). Gadzhibey carried enough fuel oil to give her a range of 1,450 nautical miles (2,690 km; 1,670 mi) at 16 knots (30 km/h; 18 mph). Her crew numbered 136.

The Fidonisy-class ships mounted a main armament of four single 102 mm Pattern 1911 Obukhov guns. Unhappy with the reliability of the 40-millimeter (1.6 in) anti-aircraft gun that was originally intended to be installed aboard Gadzhibey, the navy replaced them with a pair of 57-millimeter (2.2 in) Hotchkiss guns which were installed while the ship was still under construction in March 1917, and four 7.62-millimeter (0.3 in) Maxim machine guns. The destroyers mounted four triple 450-millimeter (17.7 in) torpedo tube mounts amidships with a pair of reload torpedoes and could carry 80 M1908 naval mines. They were also fitted with a Barr and Stroud rangefinder and two 60-centimeter (24 in) searchlights.

== Construction and service ==
The eight Fidonisy-class destroyers were ordered on 30 March [O.S. 17 March] 1915 at a cost of 2.2 million rubles each. All of the ships received names in honor of the victorious battles of Admiral Fyodor Ushakov. Among these was Gadzhibey, an alternate name for the Battle of Tendra, commemorating Ushakov's victory there during the Russo-Turkish War of 1787–1792. After being added to the Black Sea Fleet ship list on 15 July [O.S. 2 July], Gadzhibey was laid down on the slipway of the Nikolayev Admiralty Shipyard leased by the Society of Nikolayev Factories and Shipyards in Nikolayev on 11 November [O.S. 29 October] of that year, and launched on 27 August [O.S. 14 August] 1916. She was moved to Sevastopol on 1 August [O.S. 19 July] 1917 for final completion and acceptance trials, and entered service on 24 September [O.S. 11 September] of that year as part of the 3rd Division of the fleet's Torpedo Brigade.

Gadzhibey did not see combat in World War I. The Russian Provisional Government that took power after the 1917 February Revolution was powerless to prevent the Ukrainization of elements of the Black Sea Fleet by those loyal to the Ukrainian Central Rada, which included the raising of a Ukrainian flag on Gadzhibey by its Ukrainian sailors on 2 November [O.S. 20 October], in solidarity with fellow Ukrainians on the destroyer Zavidny whom the Central Committee of the All-Russian Navy had ineffectually banned from flying the Ukrainian flag. Furthermore, the Ukrainian sailors of Gadzhibey put forward a resolution, appealing to the Russian sailors of the fleet "in the hope of finding sympathy in our natural desire for national identity." Following the October Revolution, her crew sided with the Bolsheviks and shot all of their officers, including Captain 2nd rank V. Pyshnov, at the Malakhov Kurgan on 28 December [O.S. 15 December], in one of the first events of the Russian Civil War in Crimea.

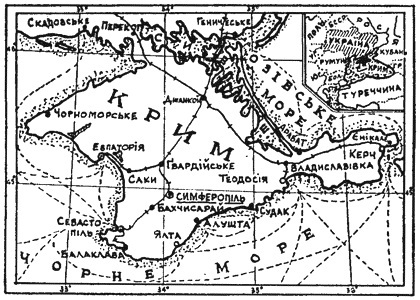
Crimea

The destroyer raised the Red flag on the next day, becoming part of the Red Black Sea Fleet, before participating in the Soviet takeover of Yalta in January 1918. At Yalta, her sailors landed on 22 January [O.S. 9 January] and engaged Crimean Tatar forces of the Crimean People's Republic. Assisted by her sisters Kerch and Fidonisy, a shore bombardment from all three destroyers enabled the wresting of the city from the Crimean Tatars, which was followed by executions of the latter by sailors and Red Guards. Between 23 and 24 April, as German troops advanced into Crimea, she landed an amphibious detachment at Yalta, which, reinforced by local Red Guards, advanced on Alushta, held by Crimean Tatar rebels who welcomed the German advance. The destroyer bombarded Alushta before the city was captured by the amphibious detachment, who again shot Crimean Tatars in retaliation for killings of Russians by Crimean Tatars.

Transferred from Sevastopol to Novorossiysk on 29 April 1918 after Germany issued an ultimatum on 25 April to the Soviet government demanding the handover of the Black Sea Fleet, she was scuttled there in Tsemes Bay at a depth of 32–38 meters (105–125 ft) on 18 June by the decision of the Soviet government to avoid capture by the former. The ship was raised by the Black Sea team of EPRON on 6 December 1928. On 4 January 1929 she was towed to Nikolayev for reconditioning, and in 1930 was transferred to Rudmetalltorg for scrapping as extensive damage to her hull made repair impractical. Her well-preserved main and auxiliary propulsion machinery was installed on her sister Petrovsky during the refit of the latter between 1930 and 1932.

== Bibliography ==
- Apalkov, Yu. V. (1996). Боевые корабли Русского флота 8.1914–10.1917 гг. Справочник [Directory of Russian Navy Warships, August 1914 – October 1917] (in Russian). St. Petersburg: Intek. ISBN 5-7559-0018-3.
- Berezhnoy, Sergey (2002). Крейсера и миноносцы. Справочник [Guide to Cruisers and Destroyers] (in Russian). Moscow: Voenizdat. ISBN 5-203-01780-8.
- Chernyshev, Alexander (2011). Русские суперэсминцы. Легендарные "Новики" [Russian Superdestroyers: Legendary Noviks] (in Russian) (2nd ed.). Moscow: Yauza/Eksmo. ISBN 978-5-699-53144-8.
- Gribovsky, Vladimir (2012). Российский флот на Черном море. Страницы истории. 1696-1924 гг [The Russian Fleet in the Black Sea: Pages of History, 1696–1924] (in Russian). St. Petersburg: Gangut. ISBN 978-5-904180-55-3.
- Korolev, Viktor (1994). Черноморская трагедия: Черноморский флот в политическом водовороте, 1917-1918 г.г. [Black Sea Tragedy: The Black Sea Fleet in the maelstrom of politics, 1917–1918] (in Russian). Simferopol: Tavria. OCLC 283465734.
- Verstyuk, Anatoly & Gordeyev, Stanislav (2006). Корабли Минных дивизий. От "Новика" до "Гогланда" [Torpedo Division Ships: From Novik to Gogland] (in Russian). Moscow: Voennaya Kniga. ISBN 5-902863-10-4.
- Zarubin, Alexander & Zarubin, Vyacheslav (2008). Без победителей: из истории Гражданской войны в Крыму [Without Winners: History of the Civil War in Crimea] (in Russian). Simferopol: AntikvA. ISBN 9789662930474.
