= Fidonisy-class destroyer =

Imperial Russian and Soviet destroyers built 1915–1924

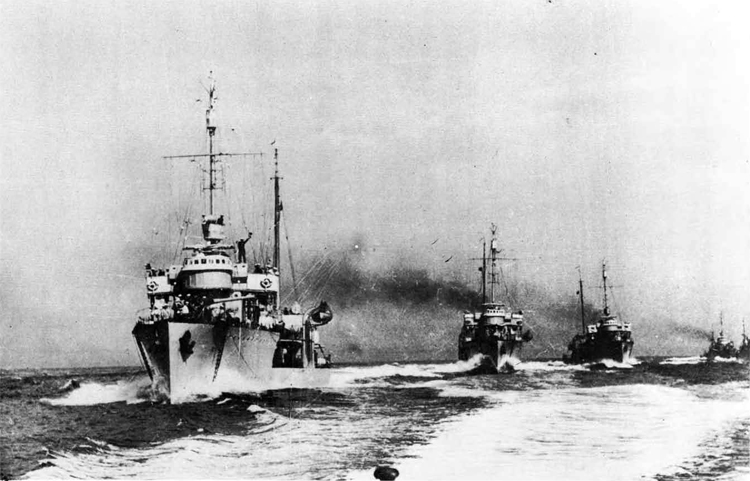
- Fidonisy-class destroyers maneuvering in close formation

Class overview
- Name: Fidonisy class
- Builders: Naval Shipyard, Nikolayev
- Operators: Imperial Russian Navy; Soviet Navy; Bulgarian Navy
- Preceded by: Derzky class
- Succeeded by: Opytny
- Cost: 2.2 million rubles each
- Built: 1915–1924
- In commission: 1916–1956
- Planned: 20
- Completed: 8
- Canceled: 12
- Lost: 7
- Scrapped: 1

General characteristics (Fidonisy as built)
- Type: Destroyer
- Displacement: 1,326 long tons (1,347 t) (normal); 1,745 long tons (1,773 t) (full load)
- Length: 92.51–93.26 m (303 ft 6 in – 306 ft 0 in)
- Beam: 9.05–9.07 m (29 ft 8 in – 29 ft 9 in)
- Draught: 3.2–3.81 m (10 ft 6 in – 12 ft 6 in)
- Installed power: 5 Thornycroft boilers; 29,000 shp (22,000 kW)
- Propulsion: 2 shafts; 2 steam turbines
- Speed: 31 knots (57 km/h; 36 mph)
- Range: 1,850 nmi (3,430 km; 2,130 mi) at 18 knots (33 km/h; 21 mph)
- Complement: 136
- Armament: 4 × single 102 mm (4 in) guns; 2 × single 40 mm (2 in) AA guns; 4 × single 7.62 mm (0.3 in) machine guns; 4 × triple 450 mm (17.7 in) torpedo tubes; 80 mines

General characteristics (1943)
- Displacement: 1,760 t (1,730 long tons) full load
- Armament: 4 × single 102 mm guns; 2 × single 45 mm (1.8 in) AA guns; 5 × single 37 mm (1.5 in) AA guns; 2 × single 20 mm (0.8 in) AA guns; 2 × single 12.7 mm (0.5 in) machine guns; 4 × triple 450 mm torpedo tubes; 80 mines

The Fidonisy class, also known as the Kerch class, were a group of eight destroyers built for the Black Sea Fleet of the Imperial Russian Navy during World War I. They participated in World War I, the Russian Civil War, and World War II.

== Design and description ==
In early 1914, several months before the beginning of World War I, the construction of a third series of eight destroyers based on Novik for the Black Sea Fleet was proposed by the Naval Ministry in response to a perceived strengthening of the Ottoman Navy. This was approved by Nicholas II on 24 June after the destroyers had received names in honor of the victories of Admiral Fyodor Ushakov on 16 June. The Fidonisy-class ships were ultimately built as an improved version of the Derzky class with an additional 102-millimetre (4 in) gun. Naval historian Siegfried Breyer considered the class to be the least successful of Novik's successors.

The ships had an overall length of 92.51–93.26 metres (303 ft 6 in – 306 ft 0 in), had a beam of 9.05–9.07 metres (29 ft 8 in – 29 ft 9 in), and a draught of 3.2–4.04 m (10.5–13.3 ft) at deep load. They normally displaced 1,326 long tons (1,347 t) and 1,745 long tons (1,773 t) at full load. Their crew consisted of 136 officers and ratings.

They were powered by two Parsons direct-drive steam turbines, each driving one propeller shaft, using steam provided by five Thornycroft boilers that operated at a pressure of 17 kg/cm^{2} (1,667 kPa; 242 psi) and a temperature of 205 °C (401 °F). The turbines, rated at 29,000 shaft horsepower (22,000 kW), were intended to give a maximum speed of 33 knots (61 km/h; 38 mph), although they reportedly averaged about 27 knots (50 km/h; 31 mph) in service. The destroyers carried a maximum of 330 tonnes (320 long tons) of fuel oil although the ships varied widely in their endurance, ranging from 1,560 nautical miles (2,890 km; 1,800 mi) at 18.5 knots (34.3 km/h; 21.3 mph) (Nezamozhnik) to 2,050 nmi (3,800 km; 2,360 mi) at 19 knots (35 km/h; 22 mph) (Zheleznyakov).

=== Armament ===
The Fidonisy class were armed with four 60-calibre 102 mm Pattern 1911 Obukhov guns, one on the forecastle and three aft; one of these latter guns was superfiring over the other two. The guns had a rate of fire of 12–15 rounds per minute. They fired a 17.5-kilogram (39 lb) shell out to a range of 16,095 m (17,602 yd) at an elevation of +30°. Each ship stowed 150 rounds per gun.

Anti-aircraft armament varied between ships. The first four were completed either with a pair of 39-calibre 40-millimetre (1.6 in) "pom-pom" guns or 58-calibre 57-millimetre (2.2 in) Hotchkiss guns. The second batch of four were fitted with a single 30-calibre 76-millimetre (3 in) Lender gun. The "pom-pom" fired its 0.91-kilogram (2 lb) shells at a rate of 300 rounds per minute, out to 6,300 m (6,900 yd) at an elevation of +45°. The 991 m/s (3,250 ft/s) muzzle velocity of the Hotchkiss gun gave its 2.22-kilogram (4.9 lb) shells a range of 8,520 m (9,320 yd) at an elevation of +21°. The Lender gun's muzzle velocity of 588 m/s (1,930 ft/s) gave it a range of 6,100 m (6,700 yd) with its 6.5-kilogram (14 lb) shell. It had a practical rate of fire of 10–12 rounds per minute.

The ships were also armed with a dozen 450-millimetre (17.7 in) torpedo tubes in four triple mounts amidships. They probably most often used the M1912 torpedo which had a 100-kilogram (220 lb) warhead. It had three speed/range settings: 6,000 metres (6,600 yd) at 28 knots (52 km/h; 32 mph); 5,000 metres (5,500 yd) at 30 knots (56 km/h; 35 mph) and 2,000 metres (2,200 yd) at 43 knots (80 km/h; 49 mph). The ships could also carry 80 mines.

== Ships ==
The ships were ordered on 17 March 1915 and all eight were built in the Russud Shipyard in Nikolaev.

Construction data
Ship	Name in Soviet service	Laid down	Launched	Completed	Fate
Feodonisy (Феодониси) then Fidonisy (Фидониси)	Not applicable	29 October 1915	31 May 1916	28 May 1917	Scuttled, 16 June 1918
Gadzhibey (Гаджибей)	Not applicable	2 February 1915	27 August 1916	11 September 1917	Scuttled, 16 June 1918
Kaliakria (Калиакрия)	Dzerzhinsky (Дзержинский)	29 October 1915	14 August 1916	30 October 1917	Scuttled, 18 June 1918; Salvaged, 4 October 1925; Sunk, 13 May 1942
Kerch (Керчь)	Not applicable	29 October 1915	31 May 1916	27 June 1917	Scuttled, 16 June 1918
Korfu (Корфу)	Petrovsky (Петровский) then Zheleznyakov (Железняков) then PKZ-62 (ПКЗ-62)	23 June 1916	10 October 1917	10 June 1925	Transferred to Bulgaria, 1947; Returned, 1949; Scrapped, 1957
Levkas (Левкас)	Shaumyan (Шаумян)	23 May 1916	10 October 1917	10 December 1925	Sunk, 10 April 1942
Tserigo (Цериго)	Not applicable	1915	21 March 1917	1918	Interned in Bizerte, French Tunisia, with Wrangel's fleet and scrapped, 1924
Zante (Занте)	Nezamozhny (Незаможный) then Nezamozhnik (Незаможник)	May 1916	21 March 1917	7 November 1923	Scuttled, February 1920; Salvaged, 7 September 1920; Sunk as a target, early 1950s

== Service ==
Only Fidonisy was completed in time to participate in combat, helping to sink some Turkish sailing ships in October 1917, before the navy ceased offensive operations against the Central Powers in response to the Bolshevik Decree on Peace in early November before a formal Armistice was signed the next month.

== Bibliography ==
- Apalkov, Yu. V. (1996). Боевые корабли русского флота 8.1914–10.1917 гг.; справочник [Directory of Russian Navy Warships, August 1914 – October 1917] (in Russian). St. Petersburg: Intek. ISBN 5-7559-0018-3.
- Breyer, Siegfried (1992). Soviet Warship Development: Volume 1: 1917–1937. London: Conway Maritime Press. ISBN 0-85177-604-3.
- Budzbon, Przemysław (1985). "Russia". In Gray, Randal (ed.). Conway's All the World's Fighting Ships 1906–1921. Annapolis, Maryland: Naval Institute Press. pp. 291–325. ISBN 0-85177-245-5.
- Budzbon, Przemysław (1980). "Soviet Union". In Chesneau, Roger (ed.). Conway's All the World's Fighting Ships 1922–1946. Greenwich, UK: Conway Maritime Press. pp. 318–346. ISBN 0-85177-146-7.
- Budzbon, Przemysław; Radziemski, Jan & Twardowski, Marek (2022). Warships of the Soviet Fleets 1939–1945. Vol. I: Major Combatants. Annapolis, Maryland: Naval Institute Press. ISBN 978-1-68247-877-6.
- Campbell, John (1985). Naval Weapons of World War II. Annapolis, Maryland: Naval Institute Press. ISBN 0-87021-459-4.
- Friedman, Norman (2011). Naval Weapons of World War One: Guns, Torpedoes, Mines and ASW Weapons of All Nations; An Illustrated Directory. Barnsley, UK: Seaforth Publishing. ISBN 978-1-84832-100-7.
- Greger, René (1972). The Russian Fleet, 1914–1917. Shepperton, UK: Ian Allan. ISBN 0-7110-0255-X.
- Hill, Alexander (2018). Soviet Destroyers of World War II. New Vanguard. Vol. 256. Oxford, UK: Osprey Publishing. ISBN 978-1-4728-2256-7.
- Likachev, Pavel Vladimirovich (2005). Эскадренные миноносцы типа «Новик» в ВМФ СССР 1920-1955 гг [Novik-class Destroyers in the Soviet Navy 1920-1955] (in Russian). Samara, Russia: ISTFLOT. ISBN 5-98830-009-X.
- Platonov, Andrey Vitalevich (2002). Энциклопедия советских надводных кораблей 1941–1945 [Encyclopedia of Soviet Warships 1941–1945] (in Russian). Saint Petersberg: Poligon. ISBN 5-89173-178-9.
- Rohwer, Jürgen (2005). Chronology of the War at Sea 1939–1945: The Naval History of World War Two (Third Revised ed.). Annapolis, Maryland: Naval Institute Press. ISBN 1-59114-119-2.
- Verstyuk, Anatoly & Gordeyev, Stanislav (2006). Корабли Минных дивизий. От "Новика" до "Гогланда" [Torpedo Division Ships: From Novik to Gogland] (in Russian). Moscow: Voennaya Kniga. ISBN 5-902863-10-4.
- Whitley, M. J. (1988). Destroyers of World War 2. Annapolis, Maryland: Naval Institute Press. ISBN 0-87021-326-1.
- Yakubov, Vladimir & Worth, Richard (2008). Raising the Red Banner: A Pictorial History of Stalin's Fleet. Gloucestershire, UK: Spellmount. ISBN 978-1-86227-450-1.
