= Russian destroyer Tserigo =

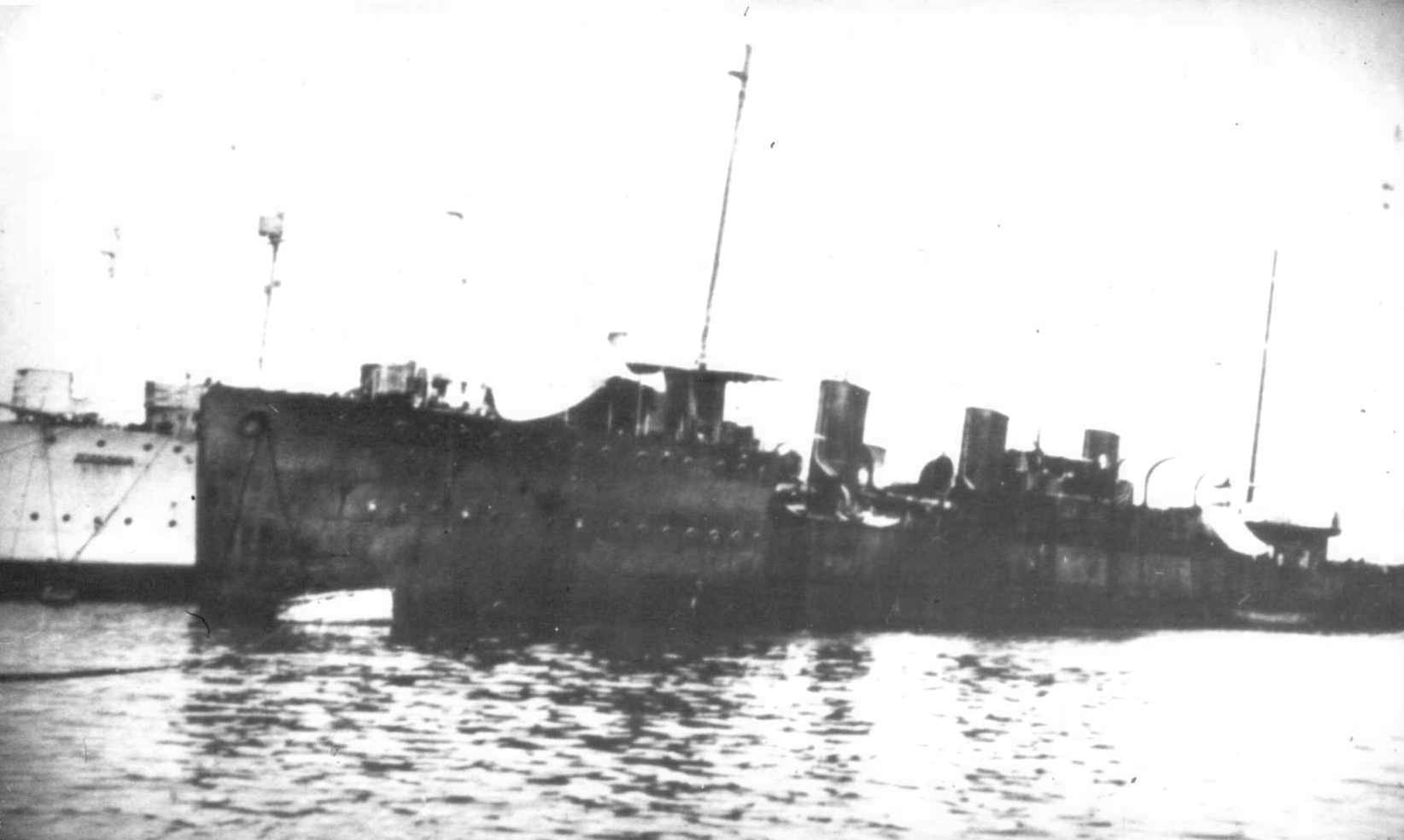
- At Bizerte in 1921

History

Russian Empire
- Name: Tserigo (Цериго)
- Namesake: Russian capture of Cythera
- Ordered: 17 March 1915
- Builder: Russud Shipyard, Nikolayev
- Laid down: 1915
- Launched: 27 March 1917
- Fate: Scrapped, 1924

General characteristics (Fidonisy as built)
- Class & type: Fidonisy-class destroyer
- Displacement: 1,326 long tons (1,347 t) (normal); 1,580 long tons (1,610 t) (full load)
- Length: 92.51 m (303 ft 6 in)
- Beam: 9.05 m (29 ft 8 in)
- Draft: 3.2 m (10 ft 6 in)
- Installed power: 5 Thornycroft boilers; 29,000 shp (22,000 kW)
- Propulsion: 2 shafts; 2 steam turbines
- Speed: 33 knots (61 km/h; 38 mph)
- Range: 1,850 nmi (3,430 km; 2,130 mi) at 18 knots (33 km/h; 21 mph)
- Complement: 136
- Armament: 4 × single 102 mm (4 in) guns; 1 × single 40 mm (2 in) AA gun; 4 × triple 450 mm (17.7 in) torpedo tubes; 80 mines

Tserigo (Цериго) was one of eight Fidonisy-class destroyers built for the Imperial Russian Navy during World War I. She was never completed and was towed to Odessa and Sevastopol after the anti-Bolshevik White evacuation of her shipyard in early 1920. After the White movement abandoned Crimea later that year, the unfinished destroyer was towed to Istanbul and then French North Africa with Wrangel's fleet. After France recognized the Soviet Union in 1924, she was intended to be transferred to Soviet control, but the agreement was never implemented. The destroyer was instead scrapped in place by 1934.

== Design and description ==
The Fidonisy-class ships were designed as an improved version of the Derzky class with an additional 102-millimeter (4 in) gun. Tserigo displaced 1,326 long tons (1,347 t) normal and 1,580 long tons (1,610 t) at full load with an overall length of 92.51 meters (303 ft 6 in), a beam of 9.05 meters (29 ft 8 in), and a draft of 3.2 meters (10 ft 6 in) at full load. She was propelled by two Parsons steam turbines, each driving one propeller, designed to produce a total of 29,000 shaft horsepower (22,000 kW) using steam from five 3-drum Thorneycroft boilers for an intended maximum speed of 33 knots (61 km/h; 38 mph). Tserigo carried enough fuel oil to give her a range of 1,850 nautical miles (3,430 km; 2,130 mi) at 18 knots (33 km/h; 21 mph). Her crew numbered 136.

The Fidonisy-class ships mounted a main armament of four single 102 mm Pattern 1911 Obukhov guns. Anti-aircraft defense for Tserigo was provided by a single 40-millimeter (1.6 in) Vickers gun and four 7.62-millimeter (0.3 in) Maxim machine guns. The destroyers mounted four triple 450-millimeter (17.7 in) torpedo tube mounts amidships with a pair of reload torpedoes and could carry 80 M1908 naval mines. They were also fitted with a Barr and Stroud rangefinder and two 60-centimeter (24 in) searchlights.

== Construction and fate ==
The eight Fidonisy-class destroyers were ordered on 17 March 1915 at a cost of 2.2 million rubles each. All of the ships received names in honor of the victories of Admiral Fyodor Ushakov. Among these was Tserigo, an alternate name (from Italian Cerigo) for the island of Kythira, commemorating Ushakov's victory there during his 1798–1799 campaign in the Ionian Islands. After being added to the Black Sea Fleet ship list on 2 July 1915, Tserigo was laid down in the Russud Shipyard in Nikolayev later that year and launched on 27 March 1917. Construction halted after the Russian Revolution and on 17 March 1918 the shipyard was captured by German troops, followed by the Ukrainian People's Army and the White Armed Forces of South Russia. When a White commission examined her, they deemed her 93% complete, as piping, armament, and torpedo tubes had not yet been installed.

In January 1920, as the Red Army approached Nikolayev, the unfinished destroyer was towed to Odessa and then to Sevastopol. Its armament was never installed nor did it enter service. On 14 November she was towed from Crimea with Wrangel's fleet during the White evacuation of the peninsula. After landing evacuees in Istanbul, she was again towed to Bizerte, Tunisia, where she was interned by the French on 29 December. The Whites sold her for scrap in 1923. Following the French recognition of the Soviet Union, her Imperial Russian naval jack was lowered and the crew left the destroyer on 29 October 1924 when the French declared her to be Soviet property. Due to the state of Franco-Soviet relations, however, the ship was never returned to the Soviet Union and in the late 1920s the Soviet scrapmetal trust Rudmetallorg sold the hulk to a French firm for scrapping. Tserigo rusted in Bizerte until 1934, when she was scrapped in place by a French company.

== Bibliography ==
- Apalkov, Yu. V. (1996). Боевые корабли Русского флота 8.1914-10.1917 гг. Справочник [Directory of Russian Navy Warships, August 1914–October 1917] (in Russian). St. Petersburg: Intek. ISBN 5-7559-0018-3.
- Berezhnoy, Sergey (2002). Крейсера и миноносцы. Справочник [Guide to Cruisers and Destroyers] (in Russian). Moscow: Voenizdat. ISBN 5-203-01780-8.
- Chernyshev, Alexander (2011). Русские суперэсминцы. Легендарные "Новики" [Russian Superdestroyers: Legendary Noviks] (in Russian) (2nd ed.). Moscow: Yauza/Eksmo. ISBN 978-5-699-53144-8.
- Verstyuk, Anatoly & Gordeyev, Stanislav (2006). Корабли Минных дивизий. От "Новика" до "Гогланда" [Torpedo Division Ships: From Novik to Gogland] (in Russian). Moscow: Voennaya Kniga. ISBN 5-902863-10-4.
