= Russian destroyer Fidonisy =

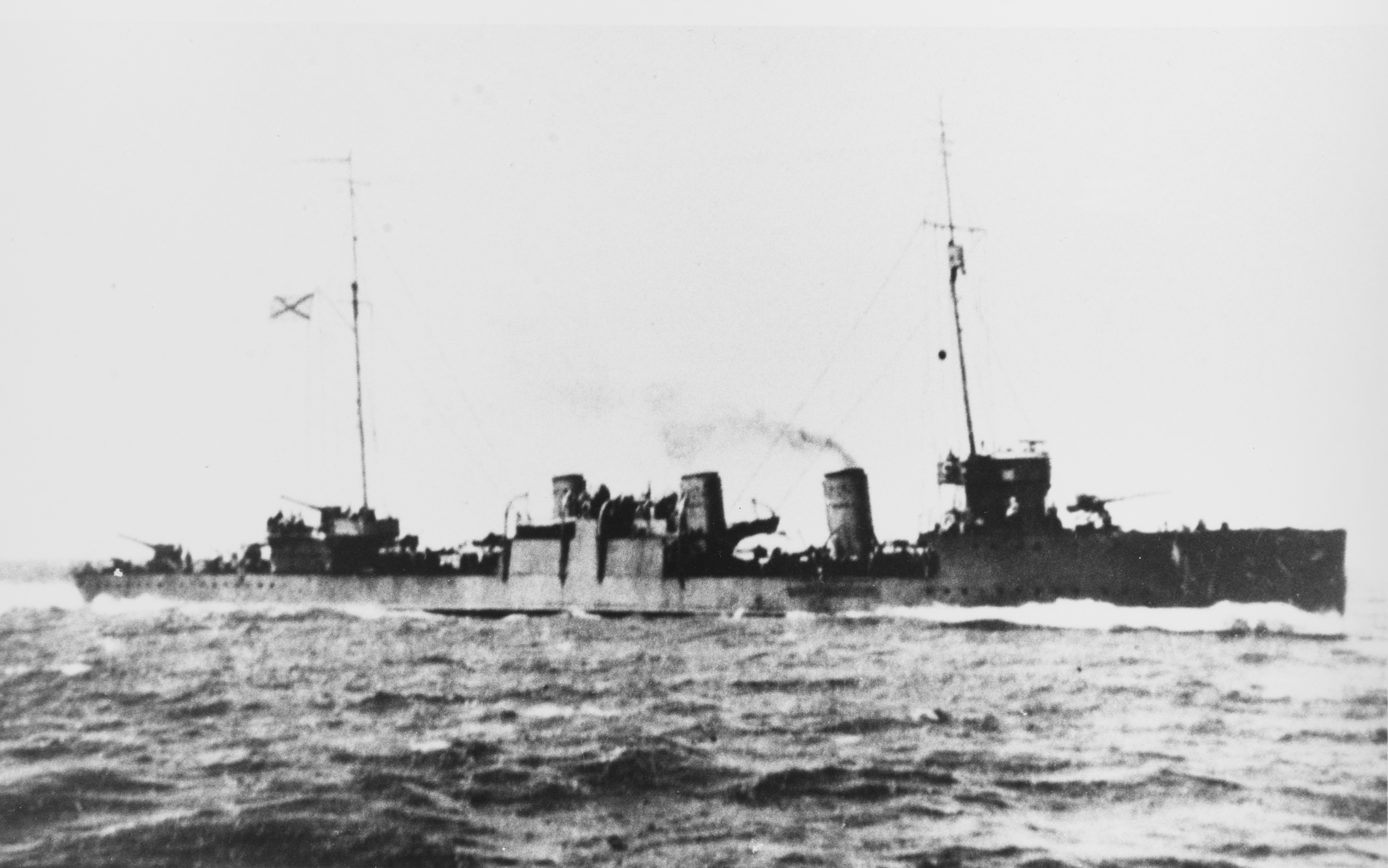
- Fidonisy in 1917

History

Russian Empire
- Name: Feodosia (Феодониси)
- Namesake: Battle of Fidonisi
- Ordered: 17 March 1915
- Builder: Russud Shipyard, Nikolayev
- Laid down: 29 October 1915
- Launched: 18 May 1916
- Commissioned: 1 June 1917
- Renamed: Fidonisy (Фидониси), 9 January 1917
- Fate: Scuttled, 18 June 1918

General characteristics (as built)
- Class & type: Fidonisy-class destroyer
- Displacement: 1,326 long tons (1,347 t) (normal); 1,580 long tons (1,610 t) (full load)
- Length: 92.51 m (303 ft 6 in)
- Beam: 9.05 m (29 ft 8 in)
- Draft: 3.2 m (10 ft 6 in)
- Installed power: 5 Thornycroft boilers; 29,000 shp (22,000 kW)
- Propulsion: 2 shafts; 2 steam turbines
- Speed: 30 knots (56 km/h; 35 mph)
- Range: 1,850 nmi (3,430 km; 2,130 mi) at 18 knots (33 km/h; 21 mph)
- Complement: 136
- Armament: 4 × single 102 mm (4 in) guns; 2 × single 40 mm (1.6 in) AA guns; 4 × single 7.62 mm (0.3 in) machine guns; 4 × triple 450 mm (17.7 in) torpedo tubes; 80 mines

Fidonisy (Фидониси) was the name ship of her class of eight destroyers built for the Imperial Russian Navy during World War I. Originally named Feodonisy (Феодониси), she was renamed Fidonisy before she was completed. Completed in 1917, she played a minor role in the war as part of the Black Sea Fleet before the Russian Revolution began later that year. Her crew joined the Bolsheviks in December and she supported their efforts to assert control in the Crimea over the next several months. The ship sailed from Sevastopol as the Germans approached in May 1918, but was scuttled in Novorossiysk harbor the following month when the Germans demanded that she be handed over as per the terms of the Treaty of Brest-Litovsk. Her wreck was discovered in 1964 and was partially salvaged.

== Design and description ==
The Fidonisy-class ships were designed as improved version of the Derzky class with an additional 102-millimeter (4 in) gun. Fidonisy had an overall length of 92.51 meters (303 ft 6 in), a beam of 9.05 meters (29 ft 8 in), and a draft of 3.2 meters (10 ft 6 in) at full load. The ship displaced 1,326 long tons (1,347 t) at normal load and 1,580 long tons (1,610 t) at full load. She was propelled by two Parsons steam turbines, each driving one propeller, designed to produce a total of 29,000 shaft horsepower (22,000 kW) using steam from five three-drum Thorneycroft boilers for an intended maximum speed of 33 knots (61 km/h; 38 mph). During her sea trials, the ship reached a speed of 31.4 knots (58.2 km/h; 36.1 mph) from 25,854 shp (19,279 kW). Fidonasi carried enough fuel oil to give her a range of 1,850 nautical miles (3,430 km; 2,130 mi) at 18 knots (33 km/h; 21 mph). Her crew numbered 136 men.

The ships mounted a main armament of four single 102 mm Pattern 1911 Obukhov guns. Anti-aircraft defense for Fidonisy was provided by a pair of 40-millimeter (1.6 in) anti-aircraft guns and four 7.62-millimeter (0.3 in) M-1 machine guns. The destroyers mounted four triple 450-millimeter (17.7 in) torpedo tube mounts amidships with a pair of reload torpedoes and could carry 80 M1908 naval mines. They were also fitted with a Barr and Stroud rangefinder and two 60-centimeter (24 in) searchlights.

== Construction and service ==
The eight Fidonisy-class destroyers were ordered on 17 March 1915 at a cost of 2.2 million rubles each. All of them received names in honor of the victories of Admiral Fyodor Ushakov. The ship that later became Fidonisy was originally named Feodonisy, an alternate spelling of Fidonisy, commemorating the Battle of Fidonisi in 1788 and she received her final name on 9 January 1917. After being added to the Black Sea Fleet ship list on 2 July 1915, Fidonisy was laid down in the Russud Shipyard in Nikolayev on 29 October 1915. The ship was launched on 18 May 1916, completed on 25 May 1917 and was accepted for service on 1 June. Fidonisy participated in a commando raid on the Turkish port of Ordu on 24 August. The following month, she was one of eight destroyers that patrolled off the west Anatolian coast and helped to sink 19 small sailing ships on 13–15 September 1917. Between 30 September and 20 October the ship participated in multiple patrols attempting to interdict the delivery of coal to Istanbul; during this time, the Russian destroyers claimed to have sunk 1 steamship, 23 sailing vessels and captured 2 others. The navy ceased offensive operations against the Central Powers in early November in response to the Bolshevik Decree on Peace before a formal Armistice was signed the next month.

In January 1918 the ship supported Bolshevik efforts to consolidate their power in Yevpatoria and Feodosia, Crimea, and helped to suppress armed resistance in Feodosia and Alushta in April. On 2 May Fidonisy sailed from Feodosia to Novorossiysk to avoid being seized by advancing German forces. On 18 June, the ship was scuttled in Tsemes Bay by torpedoes fired by her sister ship Kerch to avoid being turned over to the Germans in accordance with the terms of the Treaty of Brest-Litovsk. Broken in half, Fidonisy's wreck was discovered and partially salvaged in 1964.

== Bibliography ==
- Apalkov, Yu. V. (1996). Боевые корабли Русского флота 8.1914-10.1917 гг. Справочник [Directory of Russian Navy Warships, August 1914–October 1917] (in Russian). St. Petersburg: Intek. ISBN 5-7559-0018-3.
- Berezhnoy, Sergey (2002). Крейсера и миноносцы. Справочник [Guide to Cruisers and Destroyers] (in Russian). Moscow: Voenizdat. ISBN 5-203-01780-8.
- Chernyshev, Alexander (2011). Русские суперэсминцы. Легендарные "Новики" [Russian Superdestroyers: Legendary Noviks] (in Russian) (2nd ed.). Moscow: Yauza/Eksmo. ISBN 978-5-699-53144-8.
- Greger, René (1972). The Russian Fleet, 1914–1917. Shepperton, UK: Ian Allan. ISBN 0-7110-0255-X.
- Verstyuk, Anatoly & Gordeyev, Stanislav (2006). Корабли Минных дивизий. От "Новика" до "Гогланда" [Torpedo Division Ships: From Novik to Gogland] (in Russian). Moscow: Voennaya Kniga. ISBN 5-902863-10-4.
