= Great Adzhalyk Estuary =

Estuary in Odesa region, Ukraine

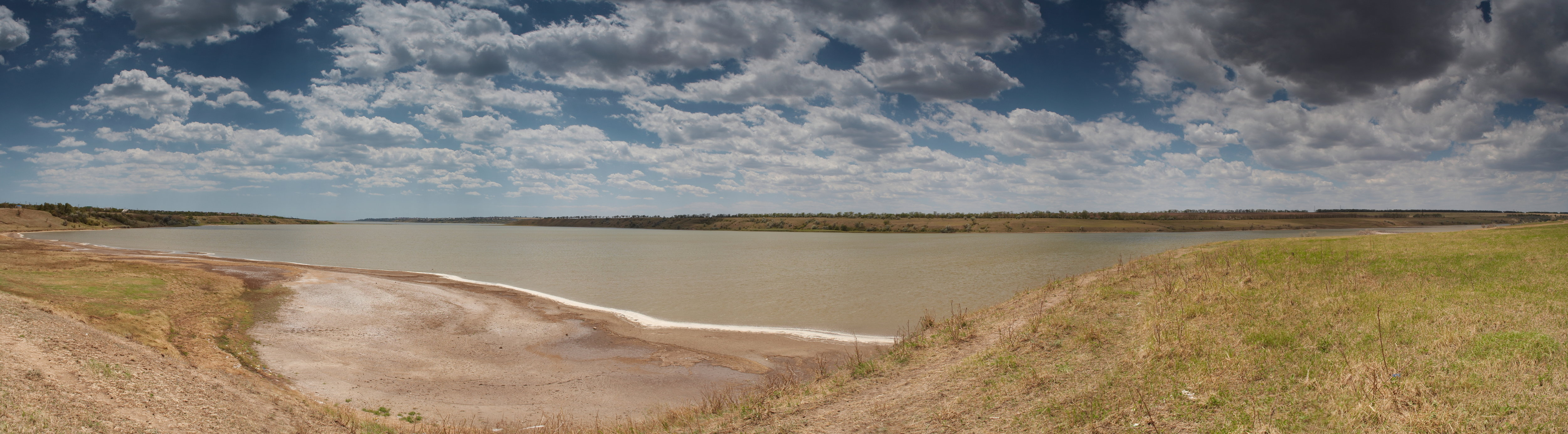
- View of the estuary

- Location within Ukraine
- Location: Ukraine
- Coordinates: 46°35′52″N 30°53′24″E
- Type: Estuary
- Primary inflows: Great Adzhalyk
- Basin countries: Ukraine
- Max. length: 7.7 km (4.8 mi)
- Max. width: 1.1 km (0.68 mi)
- Surface area: 6.0 km^{2} (2.3 sq mi)
- Average depth: 0.74 m (2 ft 5 in)
- Max. depth: 1.2 m (3 ft 11 in)
- Water volume: 4.5×10^{6} m^{3} (160×10^{6} cu ft)
- Salinity: 12.1-13.4 ‰
- Settlements: Nova Dofinivka, Vapnyarka

The Dofinivka Estuary, Great Adzhalyk Estuary, or Dofinivskyi Lyman (Note: Ukrainian: Дофінівський лиман, Великий Аджалицький лиман, romanized: Dofinivskyi lyman, Velykyi Adzhalykskyi lyman, Russian: Дофиновский лиман, Большой Аджалыцкий лиман, Turkish: Büyük Adcalik liman), is a brackish water area in South Ukraine, in 12 km to east from Odesa. The water body is an estuary of small steppe river Great Adzhalyk, which inflows to the estuary in northern part. The length of the estuary is about 8 km, width about 1 km. The water body is very shallow, maximal depth is 1.2 m, but average less than 0.5 m.

It is separated from the Black Sea by the sandbar. It is artificially connected with the sea by a tube, about 1 m in diameter, since July 2001. The estuary is the shallowest water body in the north-western Black Sea.

== Notes and references ==
- Starushenko L.I., Bushuyev S.G. (2001) Prichernomorskiye limany Odeschiny i ih rybohoziaystvennoye znacheniye. Astroprint, Odesa, 151 pp. (in Russian)
- North-western Black Sea: biology and ecology, Eds.: Y.P. Zaitsev, B.G. Aleksandrov, G.G. Minicheva, Naukova Dumka, Kyiv, 2006, 701 pp.

== Look also ==
- Berezan Estuary
- Tylihul Estuary
- Khadzhibey Estuary
- Dniester Estuary
- Sukhyi Estuary
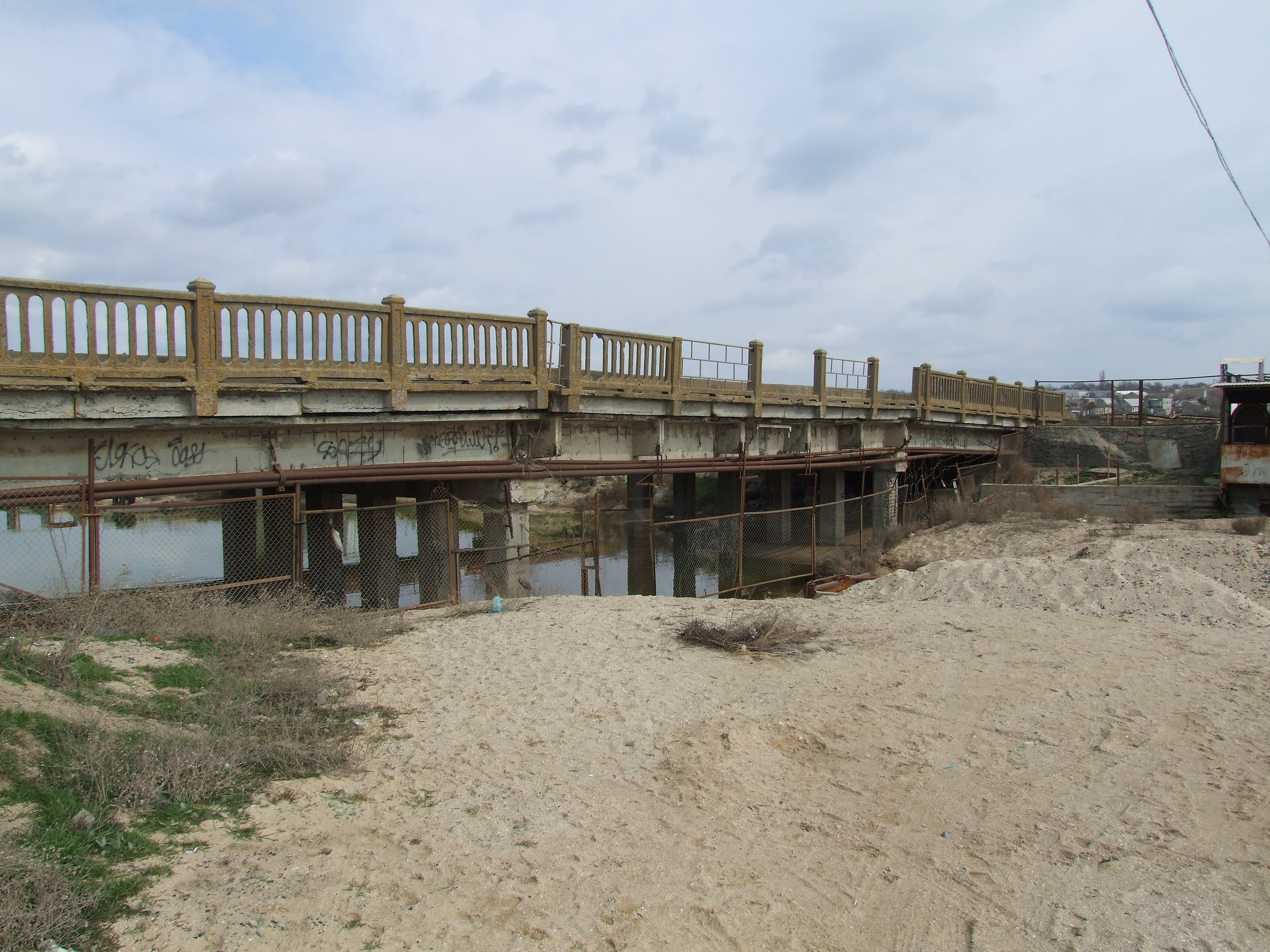

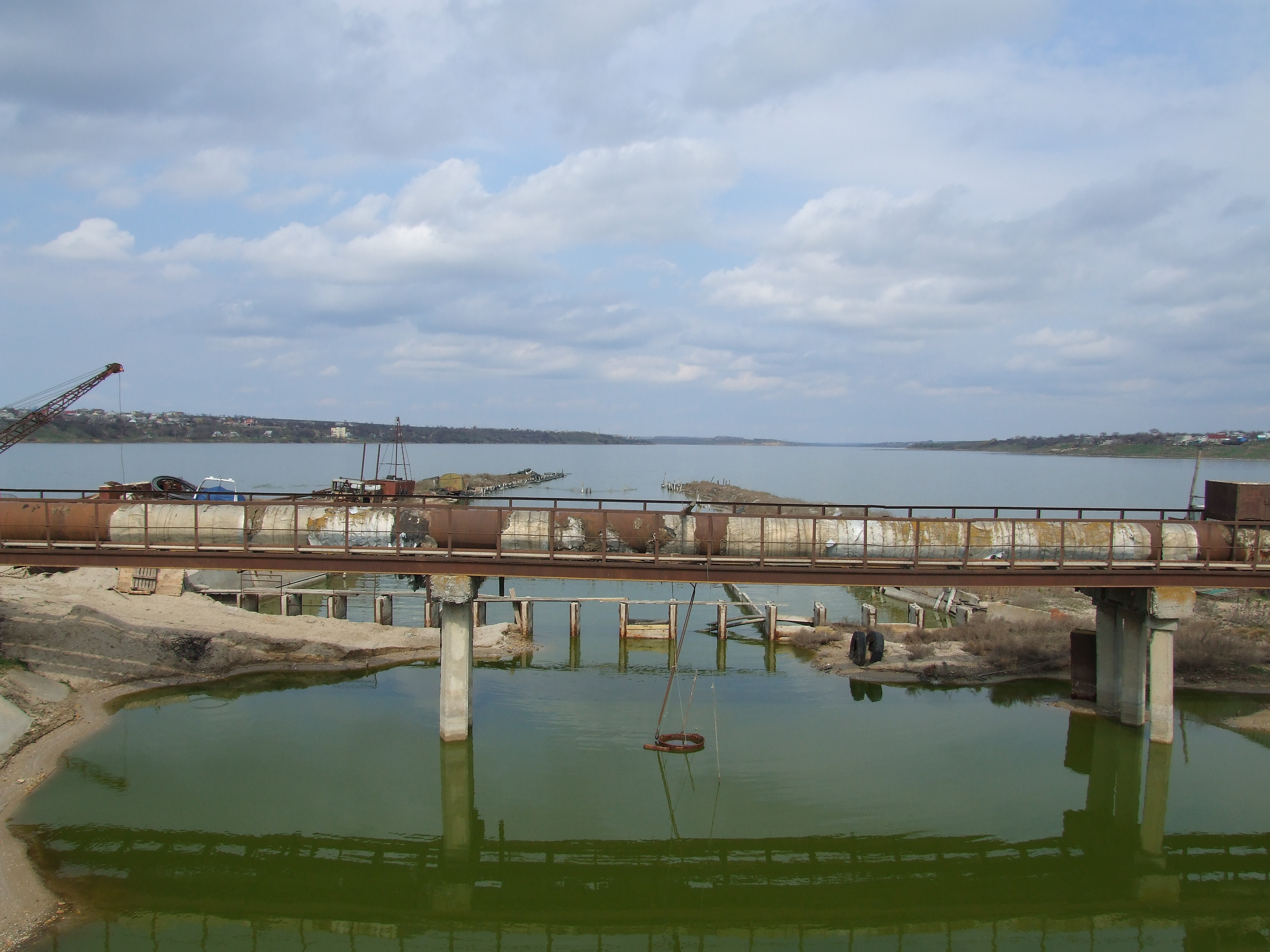

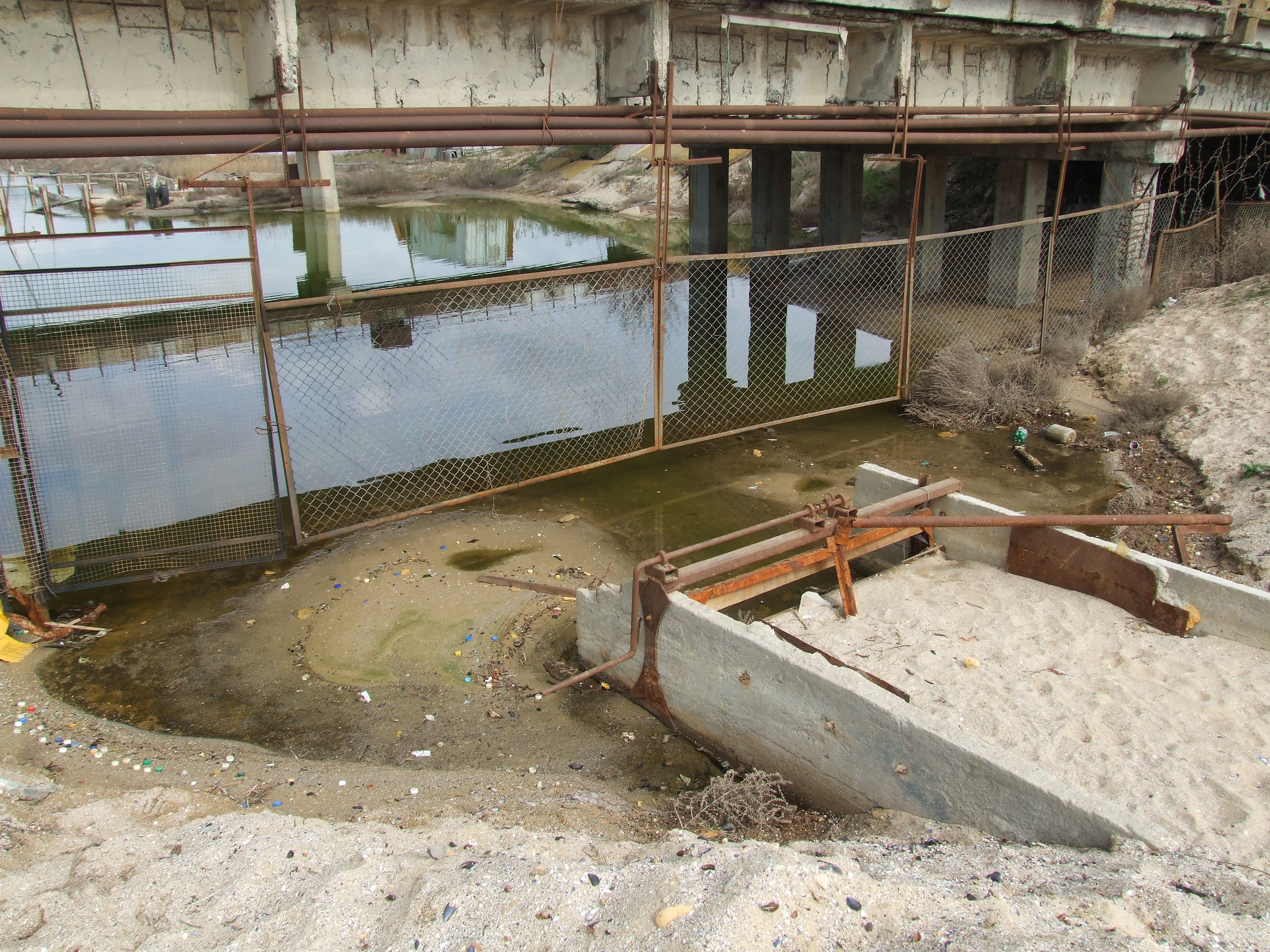
