= Soviet destroyer Zheleznyakov =

Destroyer of the Soviet Navy

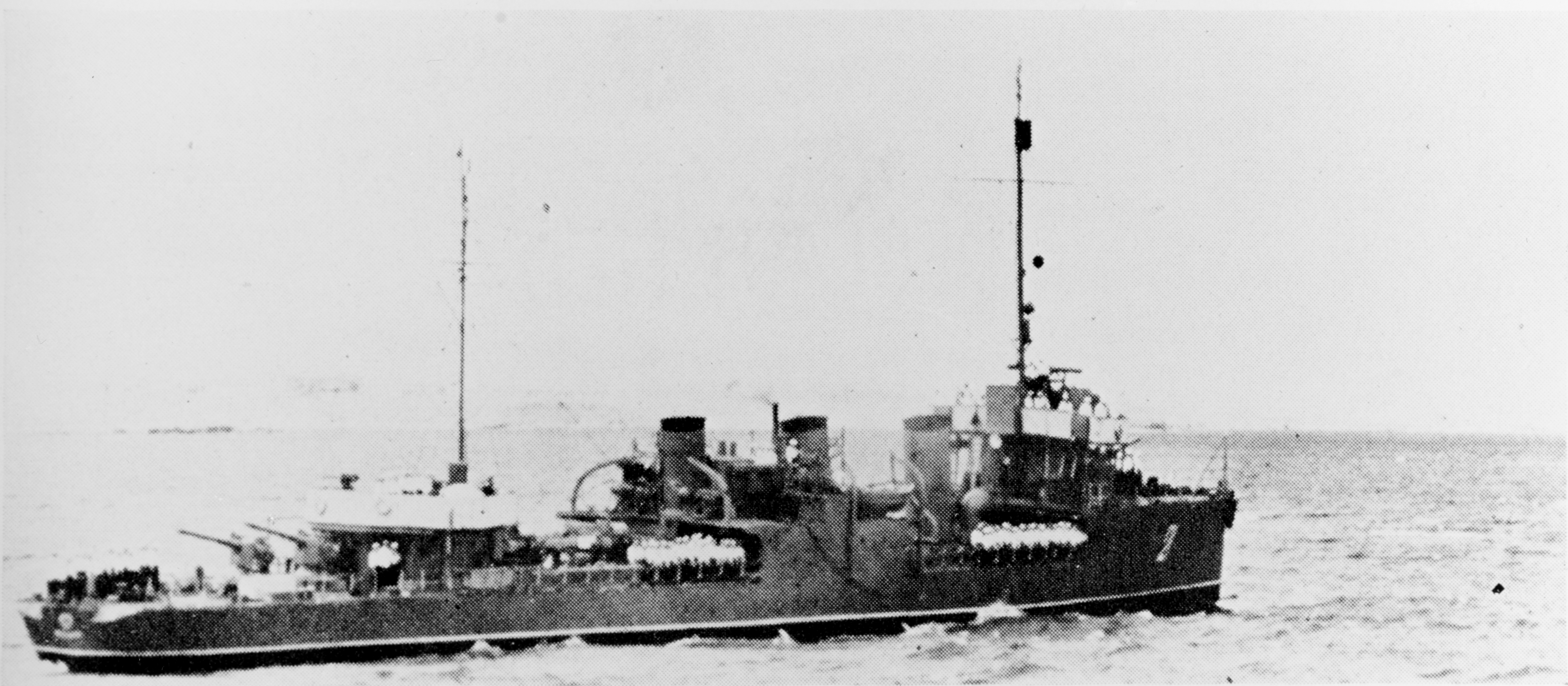
- Zheleznyakov, 1946

History

Russian Empire
- Name: Korfu (Корфу)
- Namesake: Siege of Corfu
- Builder: Naval Shipyard, Nikolayev
- Laid down: 23 May 1916
- Launched: 10 October 1917
- Fate: Captured by Germany, Ukrainian People's Army, and Red Army

Soviet Union
- Name: Korfu
- Namesake: Anatoli Zhelezniakov
- Acquired: 1920
- Commissioned: 10 June 1925
- Renamed: Petrovsky (Петровский), 5 February 1925; Zheleznyakov (Железняков), 25 June 1939
- Fate: Transferred to Bulgarian Navy, 1947

Bulgaria
- Name: Zheleznyakov
- Acquired: 18 December 1947
- Fate: Returned to the Soviet Navy, 15 September 1949

Soviet Union
- Acquired: 15 September 1949
- Renamed: PKZ-62 (ПКЗ-62), 8 April 1953
- Reclassified: As barracks ship, 8 April 1953
- Stricken: 10 July 1956
- Fate: Scrapped, 1957

General characteristics
- Class & type: Fidonisy-class destroyer
- Displacement: 1,460 long tons (1,480 t) (normal); 1,780 long tons (1,810 t) (full load)
- Length: 93.26 m (306 ft 0 in)
- Beam: 9.05 m (29 ft 8 in)
- Draft: 3.2 m (10 ft 6 in)
- Installed power: 5 Thornycroft boilers; 29,000 shp (22,000 kW)
- Propulsion: 2 shafts; 2 steam turbines
- Speed: 33 knots (61 km/h; 38 mph)
- Range: 1,450 nmi (2,690 km; 1,670 mi) at 16 knots (30 km/h; 18 mph)
- Complement: 136
- Armament: 4 × single 102 mm (4 in) guns; 1 × single 76 mm (3 in) AA gun; 1 × single 37 mm (1.5 in) AA gun; 4 × single 7.62 mm (0.3 in) machine guns; 4 × triple 450 mm (17.7 in) torpedo tubes; 80 mines

Zheleznyakov was one of eight Fidonisy-class destroyers built for the Imperial Russian Navy during World War I. She was originally named Korfu (Корфу) before she was renamed Petrovsky (Петровский) in 1925 and Zheleznyakov (Железняков) in 1939 after anarchist Anatoli Zhelezniakov.

== Design and description ==
The Fidonisy-class ships were designed as an improved version of the Derzky class with an additional 102-millimeter (4 in) gun. Korfu displaced 1,326 long tons (1,347 t) normal and 1,580 long tons (1,610 t) at full load with an overall length of 92.51 meters (303 ft 6 in), a beam of 9.05 meters (29 ft 8 in), and a draft of 3.2 meters (10 ft 6 in) at full load. She was propelled by two Parsons steam turbines, each driving one propeller, designed to produce a total of 29,000 shaft horsepower (22,000 kW) using steam from five 3-drum Thorneycroft boilers for an intended maximum speed of 33 knots (61 km/h; 38 mph). During her sea trials, the ship reached a speed of 30.9 knots (57.2 km/h; 35.6 mph). Korfu carried enough fuel oil to give her a range of 2,050 nautical miles (3,800 km; 2,360 mi) at 19 knots (35 km/h; 22 mph). Her crew numbered 136.

The Fidonisy-class ships mounted a main armament of four single 102 mm Pattern 1911 Obukhov guns, one on the forecastle and three aft; one of these latter guns was superfiring over the other two. Anti-aircraft defense for Korfu and her sisters that were completed after the war was provided by a single 76.2-millimeter (3 in) Lender gun on the stern, a 37-millimeter (1.5 in) Maxim cannon, and four 7.62-millimeter (0.3 in) M-1 machine guns. The destroyers mounted four triple 450-millimeter (17.7 in) torpedo tube mounts amidships with two reload torpedoes and could carry 80 M1908 naval mines. They were also fitted with a Barr and Stroud rangefinder and two 60-centimeter (24 in) searchlights.

== Bibliography ==
- Apalkov, Yu. V. (1996). Боевые корабли Русского флота 8.1914-10.1917 гг. Справочник [Directory of Russian Navy Warships, August 1914–October 1917] (in Russian). St. Petersburg: Intek. ISBN 5-7559-0018-3.
- Berezhnoy, Sergey (2002). Крейсера и миноносцы. Справочник [Guide to Cruisers and Destroyers] (in Russian). Moscow: Voenizdat. ISBN 5-203-01780-8.
- Breyer, Siegfried (1992). Soviet Warship Development: Volume 1: 1917–1937. London: Conway Maritime Press. ISBN 0-85177-604-3.
- Chernyshev, Alexander (2011). Русские суперэсминцы. Легендарные "Новики" [Russian Superdestroyers: Legendary Noviks] (in Russian) (2nd ed.). Moscow: Yauza/Eksmo. ISBN 978-5-699-53144-8.
- Hill, Alexander (2018). Soviet Destroyers of World War II. New Vanguard. Vol. 256. Oxford, UK: Osprey Publishing. ISBN 978-1-4728-2256-7.
- Platonov, Andrey V. (2002). Энциклопедия советских надводных кораблей 1941–1945 [Encyclopedia of Soviet Surface Ships 1941–1945] (in Russian). Saint Petersburg: Poligon. ISBN 5-89173-178-9.
- Verstyuk, Anatoly & Gordeyev, Stanislav (2006). Корабли Минных дивизий. От "Новика" до "Гогланда" [Torpedo Division Ships: From Novik to Gogland] (in Russian). Moscow: Voennaya Kniga. ISBN 5-902863-10-4.
