= Outline of the Russian Revolution of 1905 =

Topical and chronological outline of the Russian Revolution (1905)

Russian Revolution of 1905
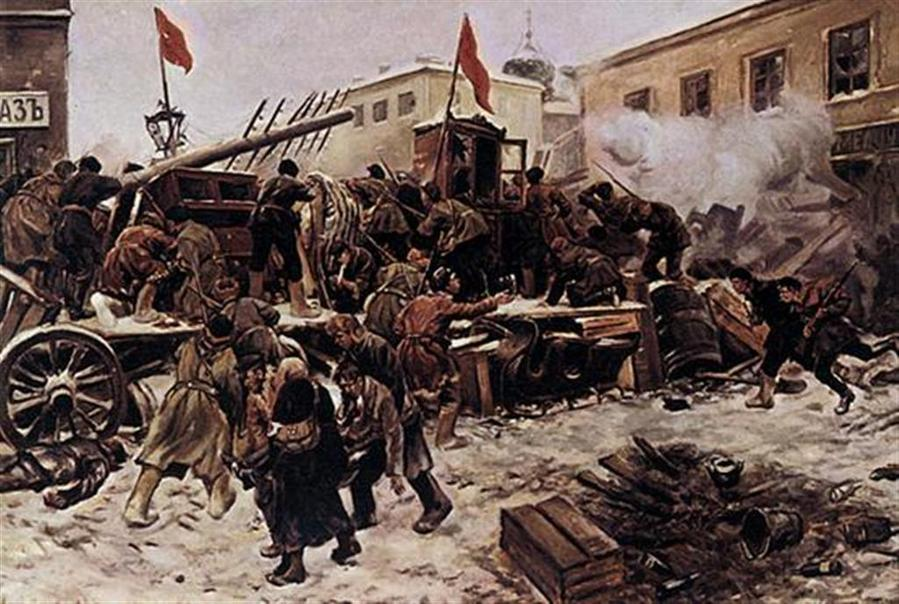
- Barricades during the Moscow uprising of 1905
Date	22 January 1905 – 16 June 1907 (2 years, 4 months and 25 days)
Location	Russian Empire
Result	Democratization of government; Nicholas II retains the throne; October Manifesto; Constitution enacted; Establishment of the State Duma

The following outline and timeline is provided as an overview of and guide to English Wikipedia articles about the Russian Revolution of 1905.

The Russian Revolution of 1905, (Note: Russian: Революция 1905 года.) also known as the First Russian Revolution, (Note: Russian: Первая Русская Революция.) was a revolution in the Russian Empire which began on 22 January 1905 and led to the establishment of a constitutional monarchy under the Russian Constitution of 1906, the country's first. The revolution was characterized by mass political and social unrest including worker strikes, peasant revolts, and military mutinies directed against Tsar Nicholas II and the autocracy, who were forced to establish the State Duma legislative assembly and grant certain rights, though both were later undermined. (Note: Dates are given in New Style (Gregorian calendar). The original Russian sources often use Old Style (Julian) dates, which are 13 days earlier in the 20th century.)

== Timeline of the Russian Revolution of 1905 ==
- 22 January [O.S. 9 January] 1905 – Bloody Sunday (1905): Peaceful workers’ procession led by Georgy Gapon, advanced on the Winter Palace calling for reforms, fired upon by Imperial guards outside the Winter Palace in Saint Petersburg, triggering widespread strikes and unrest.
- 18 February [O.S 5 February] 1905 – Tsar dismisses Minister of the Interior Pyotr Sviatopolk-Mirsky; Dmitri Trepov appointed governor of Saint Petersburg.
- 5 March 1905 – The government commission to investigate workers’ discontent was dissolved without action.
- 27 June 1905 – Mutiny aboard the Russian battleship Potemkin in the Black Sea; sailors rebel against officers, temporarily seizing the ship.
- 14 October [O.S. 1 October] 1905 – The October Manifesto is presented to Tsar Nicholas II, promising civil liberties, creation of the Duma, and broader suffrage.
- 30 October [O.S. 17 October] 1905 – Tsar Nicholas II signs the October Manifesto, aiming to quell unrest.
- October 1905 – General strike paralyzes Saint Petersburg and Moscow; establishment of Saint Petersburg Soviet of Workers' Deputies.
- December 1905 – Armed uprisings in Moscow and other cities violently suppressed by government troops.
- 6 May [O.S. 23 April] 1906 – Russian Constitution of 1906 enacted, creating constitutional monarchy with limited powers for the Duma.
- 27 April 1906 – First State Duma convenes; dissolved by Tsar after 73 days in July 1906.
- June 1907 – Second State Duma dissolved; electoral reforms reduce franchise in favor of propertied classes.

== Overview ==
- Russian Revolution of 1905

== Background ==
- Russo-Japanese War
  - Outline of the Russo-Japanese War
  - Timeline of the Russo-Japanese War

== Uprisings and massacres ==
- Bloody Sunday (1905) (22 January 1905 – massacre of workers by Imperial guards at the Winter Palace that triggered nationwide unrest.
- Moscow uprising of 1905 (7–18 December 1905) – armed worker rebellion in Moscow, the climax of the revolutionary wave.
- Kronstadt mutinies / 1905 Kronstadt Mutiny (June 1905) – sailors in Kronstadt rebelled against naval authority.
- Sevastopol Uprising (June 1905) – revolt among Black Sea Fleet sailors following the Potemkin mutiny.
- Sveaborg rebellion (July 1906) – mutiny at Suomenlinna fortress near Helsinki, part of revolutionary discontent in the navy.
- Łódź insurrection (June 1905) – major workers’ uprising in Congress Poland.
- Tukums Uprising (1905) – rural rebellion in present-day Latvia.
- Revolution in the Kingdom of Poland (1905–1907) – Broader revolt spanning parts of Polish territories.
- Riga expedition (1905) – Government crack-down on revolutionaries in Riga.
- Russian Peasants' uprising of 1905–1906 – Widespread agrarian revolts peaking during 1905.

=== Russian battleship Potemkin mutiny ===
- Russian battleship Potemkin (mutiny June 1905) – crew mutinied over harsh conditions and political radicalization.

==== Key figures ====
- Afanasi Matushenko – Torpedo quartermaster who took command of the Potemkin mutiny on 27 June 1905.
- Grigory Vakulenchuk – Sailor whose death during initial confrontation sparked the sailors’ uprising aboard Potemkin.
- Grigoriy Pavlovich Chukhnin – Commander of the Black Sea Fleet who brutally suppressed the mutiny and later crushed related unrest
- Ippolit Giliarovsky – First officer aboard Potemkin, killed by the crew during the uprising.
- Ivan Beshoff – Survivor of the Potemkin mutiny who later settled abroad.
- Semen Hryzlo – Revolutionist commended for his role in supporting the mutiny.

==== Other ships involved ====
- Russian battleship Dvenadsat Apostolov – Sent to recapture *Potemkin* during the mutiny in June 1905
- Russian battleship Georgii Pobedonosets – Temporarily joined the mutiny in Odessa before returning to loyalist control.
- Russian battleship Rostislav – Crew threatened mutiny but ultimately remained loyal, helping suppress Potemkin crew
- Russian battleship Sinop – Participated in the initial naval mobilization during the mutinous events.
- Russian torpedo boat Ismail – Vessel that joined the *Potemkin* crew’s flight toward Odessa.
- NMS Elisabeta – Romanian cruiser that Potemkin sailors approached seeking asylum.

== Revolutionary republics ==
- Gurian Republic (1902–1906) – peasant self-rule in western Georgia, peaking during the 1905 revolution.
- Markovo Republic (May–November 1905) – peasant commune near Moscow that governed itself during the revolution.
- Novorossiysk Republic (1905) – workers’ soviet briefly held control of this Black Sea port.
- Stary Buyan Republic (1905) – autonomous peasant republic in the Samara region.
- Shuliavka Republic (November 1905) – workers’ self-rule established in a Kyiv suburb.
- Chita Republic (April–October 1905) – soviet-style government in Siberia formed by workers and soldiers.
- Comrat Republic (January 1906) – short-lived autonomous republic formed by Gagauz revolutionary peasants.

== Organizations and groups ==
- Black Hundreds (active 1905–1917) – monarchist paramilitary groups organized in response to the 1905 Revolution; engaged in violent pogroms and suppression of liberal and revolutionary movements.
- Bolshevik Military Organizations (formed 1905) – underground Bolshevik groups organized within the army and navy during the revolution to incite mutinies and support armed insurrection.
- Combat Organization of the Socialist Revolutionary Party (active by 1905) – engaged in targeted assassinations and revolutionary violence.
- Coup of June 1907 – reactionary closure of the Second Duma, effectively ending the reform momentum of 1905.
- First All Russian Conference of Trade Unions (1905) – marked the beginning of a coordinated national labor movement.
- Great Seimas of Vilnius (October 1905) – Lithuanian national assembly demanding autonomy within the Russian Empire.
- Lithuanian Women's Association – Eastern European women’s national movement springing from 1905.
- Moscow Group – Marxist revolutionary cell active in organizing Moscow workers.
- Party of Democratic Reform (Russia) (formed 1905) – moderate liberal party advocating constitutional monarchy.
- Russian Social Democratic Labour Party (founded 1898; split in 1903) – central Marxist party in Russia, both Bolsheviks and Mensheviks led strikes, protests, and soviet formations in 1905.
- Saint Petersburg Soviet (formed October 1905 – dissolved December 1905) – key workers’ council created during the general strike; led by revolutionaries including Trotsky and became a model for future soviets.
- Second All Russian Conference of Trade Unions (1906) – followed the first wave of labor organization and strikes.
- Socialist Revolutionary Party (founded 1901) – agrarian socialist party that played a major role in the 1905 Revolution through peasant organizing, political agitation, and targeted assassinations via its Combat Organization.
- Union for Women's Equality (founded 1905) – liberal feminist group promoting women’s rights and suffrage.
- Union of Poor Peasants (founded 1905) – anarchist group in Huliaipole (Ukraine) that engaged in armed robbery, propaganda, and insurrection during and after the 1905 Revolution.
- Union of Unions (1904–1905) – coalition of professional associations pushing for political reform.

== Aftermath ==
- Coup of June 1907 – Retrospective cancellation of 1905 reform efforts via Duma dissolution.

== Locations ==
- Winter Palace – site of the Bloody Sunday procession and symbol of autocratic power.
- Kirov Plant – major industrial site in St. Petersburg and focal point for 1905 labor strikes.
- Kronstadt – naval base where sailors mutinied in June 1905, becoming a revolutionary stronghold.

== Documents ==
- The St. Petersburg workmen's petition to the Tsar (January 22, 1905) – Workers delivered grievances directly on Bloody Sunday.
- October Manifesto – A document issued by Tsar Nicholas II in October 1905 granting basic civil liberties and creating the Duma, aimed at quelling revolutionary unrest during the 1905 Russian Revolution.
- Vyborg Manifesto (July 1906) – statement by Duma deputies urging civil disobedience after the Tsar dissolved the First Duma.

== Literature and media ==
=== Literature ===
- Mother (novel) (1906) – Gorky’s portrayal of a working-class mother radicalized by the revolution.
- The Life of Klim Samgin (1927–1936) – multi-volume novel chronicling a Russian intellectual through the pre-revolutionary period.
- Petersburg (novel) (1913) – Andrei Bely’s symbolist novel set during the revolutionary unrest of 1905.
- Doctor Zhivago (novel) (1957) – begins during the 1905 Revolution and follows events through 1917.
- The Silver Dove (1909) – novel by Andrei Bely that reflects early revolutionary and mystical themes.
- A Woman's Burden – dramatic portrayal of women’s lives and roles during the revolutionary period.
- Zhupel (magazine, 1905–1906) – satirical journal produced during the liberalization of press censorship.
- Red Mutiny: Eleven Fateful Days on the Battleship Potemkin – Historical account of the mutiny in book form.

=== Films and media ===
- Battleship Potemkin – 1925 Soviet silent film by Sergei Eisenstein depicting the 1905 mutiny aboard the Russian battleship.
- Exile to Siberia – 1930s Polish film portraying revolutionary activity and its consequences under Tsarist repression.
- Fiddler on the Roof (film) – 1971 musical drama set in Imperial Russia, with background tensions reflecting the unrest of 1905.
- The Murder of General Gryaznov – 1921 Soviet film dramatizing an assassination tied to the revolutionary period.

== People ==
=== Revolutionary leaders and party organizers ===
- Alexander Bogdanov (Russian: Александр Александрович Богданов; 1873–1928) – Bolshevik theorist arrested in 1905 for protest activity and soviet organizing.
- Julius Martov (Russian: Юлий Осипович Мартов; 1873–1923) – Prominent Menshevik who organized protests and strike committees in Petrograd.
- Leon Trotsky (Russian: Лев Давидович Троцкий; 1879–1940) – Chief spokesman and leader of the St. Petersburg Soviet during the 1905 general strike.
- Vladimir Lenin (Russian: Владимир Ильич Ленин; 1870–1924) – Bolshevik strategist and author of *Two Tactics of Social Democracy* during the 1905 revolution.
- Yakov Sverdlov (Russian: Яков Моисеевич Свердлов; 1885–1919) – Key organizer in the St. Petersburg Soviet.
- Afanasi Matushenko – Torpedo quartermaster who took command of the Potemkin mutiny on 27 June 1905.
- Semen Hryzlo – Revolutionist commended for his role in supporting the Potemkin mutiny.

=== Socialist and worker activists ===
- Abram Gots (Russian: Абрам Соломонович Гоц; 1872–1940) – SR member who helped organize armed resistance during the Moscow uprising.
- Filipp Goloshchyokin (Russian: Филипп Исаевич Голощёкин; 1882–1941) – Bolshevik who built strike committees in Petrograd and Moscow.
- Fyodor Gladkov (Russian: Фёдор Васильевич Гладков; 1883–1958) – Propagandist and underground printer for Bolshevik literature in 1905.
- Isidore Gukovsky (Russian: Исидор Гуковский; 1884–1919) – Petrograd-based Bolshevik organizer.
- Martyn Liadov (Russian: Мартын Иванович Лядов; 1872–1947) – Helped organize armed workers’ detachments during the Moscow uprising.
- Peter Arshinov (Russian: Пётр Андреевич Аршинов; 1887–c.1937) – Published the underground newspaper *Molot* during the 1905 strikes.
- Sergey Ivanovich Gusev (Russian: Сергей Иванович Гусев; 1883–1945) – Bolshevik active in strike coordination and regional committees.
- Vladimir Bazarov (Russian: Владимир Борисович Базаров; 1885–1939) – Propagandist and supporter of strike actions in 1905.

=== Anarchists and Socialist Revolutionary activists ===
- Anastasia Bitsenko (Russian: Анастасия Алексеевна Биценко; 1875–1938) – SR Combat Organization member involved in armed resistance.
- Iosif Bleikhman (Russian: Иосиф Соломонович Блейхман; 1868–1921) – Anarchist agitator and pamphleteer in 1905 Petrograd.
- Sofia Smidovich (Russian: Софья Смидович; 1872–1951) – SR-affiliated organizer of women’s political groups and street agitation.
- Volin (Russian: Волин; real name Russian: Всеволод Эйхенбаум; 1882–1945) – Anarchist participant in the Petersburg Soviet and Kronstadt uprising.
- Yevno Azef (Russian: Евно Фишелевич Азеф; 1869–1918) – SR Combat leader and Okhrana informant; coordinated high-profile assassinations.

=== Female activists ===
- Nadezhda Krupskaya (Russian: Надежда Константиновна Крупская; 1869–1939) – Organized underground workers’ education and propaganda networks.
- Olga Kameneva (Russian: Ольга Борисовна Каменева; 1883–1941) – Supported Bolshevik militants through safehouses and courier work.
- Olga Pilatskaya (Russian: Ольга Пилатская; 1884–1952) – Joined the St. Petersburg Soviet and supported women-led demonstrations.

=== Regional leaders ===
- Djelal ed-Din Korkmasov (Russian: Джелал‑эд‑Дин Коркмасов; 1880–1937) – Tatar Marxist organizer in southern Russia.
- Fricis Roziņš (Russian: Фрицис Розиньш; 1870–1919) – Latvian socialist leader and editor of revolutionary press in Riga.
- Jānis Jansons-Brauns (Russian: Янис Янсонс-Браунс; 1874–1929) – Leader in the Latvian Social Democratic Workers’ Party during Baltic unrest.
- Juda Grossman (Russian: Юда Львович Гроссман; 1883–1934) – Jewish Bundist organizing pogrom resistance and labor actions.
- Mieczysław Kozłowski (Russian: Мечислав Козловский; 1883–1975) – Polish-Bolshevik active in Warsaw and Lithuanian strike networks.
- Sultan Klych-Girey (Russian: Султан Клыч-Гирей) – Crimean Tatar noble involved in political agitation.

=== Tsarist officials and leaders ===
- Grand Duke Sergei Alexandrovich of Russia (Russian: Сергей Александрович; 1857–1905) – Assassinated by SR militants during 1905 unrest.
- Ivan Fullon (Russian: Иван Иванович Фуллон; 1844–1920) – Governor of St. Petersburg whose policies facilitated early worker societies.
- Nicholas II (Russian: Николай II; 1868–1918) – Ordered military repression of 1905 protests; signed October Manifesto under pressure.
- Pyotr Sviatopolk-Mirsky (Russian: Пётр Дмитриевич Святополк-Мирский; 1857–1939) – Interior Minister who attempted limited reforms but endorsed repression.
- Sergei Witte (Russian: Сергей Юльевич Витте; 1849–1915) – Authored the October Manifesto as a response to the revolutionary crisis.
- Grigoriy Pavlovich Chukhnin – Commander of the Black Sea Fleet who brutally suppressed the mutiny and later crushed related unrest
- Ippolit Giliarovsky – First officer aboard Potemkin, killed by the crew during the uprising.

=== Other notable figures ===
- Ivan Narodny (Russian: Иван Иванович Народный; 1877–1958) – Provided logistical and ideological support to 1905 labor circles.
- Ludwig Martens (Russian: Людвиг Карлович Мартенс; 1875–1948) – Engineer and press distributor supporting the Bolsheviks.
- Nikolai Pavlovich Schmidt (Russian: Николай Павлович Шмидт; 1883–1906) – Liberal industrialist and financial supporter of revolutionaries.
- Grigory Vakulenchuk – Sailor whose death during initial confrontation sparked the sailors’ uprising aboard Potemkin.

== Miscellaneous ==
- SS John Grafton – ship used by revolutionaries to smuggle weapons into the Russian Empire.

== See also ==
- Category:Russian Revolution of 1905
- Index of articles related to the Russian Revolution and Civil War
