= Vekha =

General characteristics
- Type: Military transport

Vekha was a military transport ship of the Black Sea Fleet that briefly joined the Potemkin mutiny. It was commanded by a colonel, Baron P P Eikhen. On 28 June [O.S. 15 June] 1905 (the second day of the mutiny), Vekha approached Odessa where the mutineers were burying their fallen leader Grigory Vakulinchuk. Eikhen was unaware of the mutiny so he obeyed a semaphore message telling him to come aboard. Fifteen armed sailors arrested him. He dropped his sabre and was locked up with the officers. The remaining two officers and the doctor were signaled to come aboard, and after their arrest Vekha was ordered to stay by the battleship. The revolutionaries then took it over easily. Its 60 sailors pleaded successfully for the officers' lives, and the officers were set ashore with the others in Odessa.

Vekha abandoned the mutineers after the battleship Georgii Pobedonosets did the same on the evening of 1 July [O.S. 18 June] 1905.
