= Nina Agadzhanova =

Soviet revolutionary, screenwriter and film director

Nina Agadzhanova–Shutko
- Born: Antonina Nikolaevna Batorovskaya; 27 October / 8 November 1889; Krasnodar, Russian Empire
- Died: 14 December 1974 (aged 85); Moscow, Russian SFSR, Soviet Union
- Other names: Nune Agadzhanova (Shutko), Nuneh Agadzhanova (Shutko), N.F. Agadzhanova (Shutko), Nina Ferdinandova Agadzhanova
- Occupations: Screenwriter, film director, revolutionary
- Spouse: Kirill Shutko

Nina Agadzhanova–Shutko (27 October / 8 November 1889 – 14 December 1974) was a Soviet revolutionary, screenwriter, and film director. She is most widely recognized for writing The Year 1905, the original screenplay from which Battleship Potemkin was created.

== Biography ==
=== Political work ===
Agadzhanova first joined the Bolshevik faction of the Russian Social Democratic Labor Party (which would later become the CPSU) in 1907 while studying philosophy and history at university in Ekaterinodar. From 1907 to 1914 conducted illegal work for the party, helping to create Bolshevik networks between Voronezh, Oryol, Moscow, Iranovo-Voznesensk, and Petersburg. From 1914 to 1915 Agadzhanova was a member of the Vyborg Committee of the Bolshevik party in the Petrograd Soviet. During this time, she also functioned as the executive secretary of Rabotnitsa, a periodical dedicated to the issues of women workers. It is estimated that Agadzhanova was arrested a total of five times and exiled twice during her time working as a Bolshevik revolutionary before the Russian Revolution in 1917.

Agadzhanova participated actively in both the February and October Revolutions of 1917. After the revolution, she was drafted to participate in an underground propaganda mission among the White Guard forces in Novorossiysk and Rostov-on-Don. She later wrote a screenplay based on her experiences during the mission titled In The White Roses. In 1919 she served as a member of the underground Don Oblast committee of the CPSU, until she was drafted to become the executive secretary of the Byelorussian Revolutionary Military Committee in 1920. From 1921–22 she was drafted to work at the Soviet embassy in Prague.

=== Work in film ===
Agadzhanova began to work as a screenwriter in 1924 at the suggestion of her husband Kirill Shutko, a high-ranking Soviet cultural functionary. She wrote her first screenplay the same year, entitled In The White Roses (also referred to as In the Whites' Rear or Behind White Lines). A semi-autobiographical account of her time infiltrating the White Guard in Novorossiysk and Rostov-on-Don, the screenplay was commissioned for production in the spring of 1925, and was co-directed by Boris Chaikovskii and Ol'ga Rakhmanova.

==== The Year 1905 and Battleship Potemkin ====
On 17 March 1925, Agadzhanova was contracted to write a screenplay by a government commission established to commemorate the 20th anniversary of the Revolution of 1905. The committee was headed by Anatoly Lunacharsky, the Soviet People's Commissar for Enlightenment, and members of the committee included Agadznahova's close friend Kazimir Malevich and her husband Kirill Shutko. Agadzhanova was to write a treatment, which was in turn entrusted to filmmaker Sergei Eisenstein to be collaboratively developed into a screenplay by Nina, Sergei, and Valeryan Pletinov. Pletinov later dropped out of the project due to a conflict over writing credit in his previous collaboration with Eisenstein on Strike. This left Nina and Eisenstein to draft the script together over the spring and summer of 1925 at Nina and her husband's dacha at Nemchinovka on the outskirts of Moscow.

Initially, The Year 1905 was conceived as a coverage of several events of 1905 including: The Russo-Japanese War; the Bloody Sunday massacre; popular uprisings which occurred in both rural and urban areas across the nation; the general strike and the backlash from the Russian state; a mutiny on the Russian battleship Potemkin; counter-Revolutionary and anti-Jewish pogroms; and the development of a workers' resistance movement in Krasnaya Presnya.

While Agadzhanova and Eisenstein had a positive working relationship, there was a degree of creative conflict over the screenplay. Agandzhanova took issue with Eisenstein's desire to insert fictitious events into the screenplay, including a general strike among lifeguards, icon painters, and chambermaids. While Eisenstein was a child during the events of 1905, Agadzhanova, ten years his senior, had participated in uprisings in Ekaterinodar as a teenager and joined the Bolsheviks in 1907. Agadzhanova disagreed with Eisenstein's desire to take such creative liberties in their recreation of the events of 1905, and Eisenstein agreed to forego incorporating his more eccentric ideas from the screenplay. In an essay written in 1945 for a collection to celebrate the twentieth anniversary of The Battleship Potemkin, Eisenstein wrote: "[Nina] was the first Bolshevik civilian I had met - all the others had sat on military committees or they were 'senior staff'. She was quite simply a human being... She instilled in me a true sense of the historical revolutionary past".

Due to time constraints and budget problems, only one chapter of The Year 1905 was shot by Eisenstein and his team. Eisenstein chose to focus on the mutiny on the Russian battleship Potemkin. The filmmaker also diverged greatly from the original screenplay during production, developing the film's now famous Odessa Steps sequence while on set. The film premiered on Dec 1st 1925 as The Battleship Potemkin. Despite this diversion from the screenplay, Agadzhanova was ultimately very enthusiastic about the film, telling Eisenstein in a letter written after the film's premiere that cinematographer Eduard Tisse, "is not a camera operator, he is a god".

==== Projects after The Year 1905 ====
An unused portion of The Year 1905 developed primarily by Agadznahova was used for another anniversary film entitled, Krasnaia Presnaia. Directed by Abram Room and Leo Mur, the film chronicled an armed workers' uprising in Moscow. In 1929 Agadzhanova co-wrote a script for Two-Buildi-Two with Lev Kuleshov. Kuleshov was set to direct the film, but lost interest in the project once re-shoots were ordered. Agadznahova took over direction on the re-shoots, earning a co-director credit on the film. In 1933, Agadznahova co-wrote The Deserter alongside Aleksandr Lazebnikov and M. Krasnostavsky. The film was directed by Vsevolod Pudovkin. She collaborated on Pudovkin on another project in 1934 titled The Intervention, but this film did not make it to production. Between 1930 and 1936 Agadshanova worked as a script consultant at the Mezhrabpomfilm studios in Moscow. In 1945, she began teaching screenwriting at the All-Union State Institute of Cinematography, where she worked for several years.

== Filmography ==
Year	English Title	Credit	Notes
1925	In The White Roses (In The Whites' Rear or Behind White Lines)	Writer	Directed by Boris Chaikovskii and Ol'ga Rakhmanova.
1925	Battleship Potemkin	Co-writer	Based on an excerpt from the screenplay The Year 1905
1926	Krasnaia Presnaia	Writer	Based on an excerpt from the screenplay The Year 1905. Directed by Abram Room and Leo Mur.
1929	Two-Buildi-Two	Co-writer & co-director	Co-directed and co-written by Lev Kuleshov.
1929	The Sailor Ivan Gallai	Writer	Directed by Matrol Ivan Gallais.
1933	The Deserter	Co-writer	Co-written with M. Krasnostavsky and Aleksandr Lazebnikov. Directed by Vsevolod Pudovkin.
