= Beatrice Vitoldi =

Soviet actress (1895–1939)

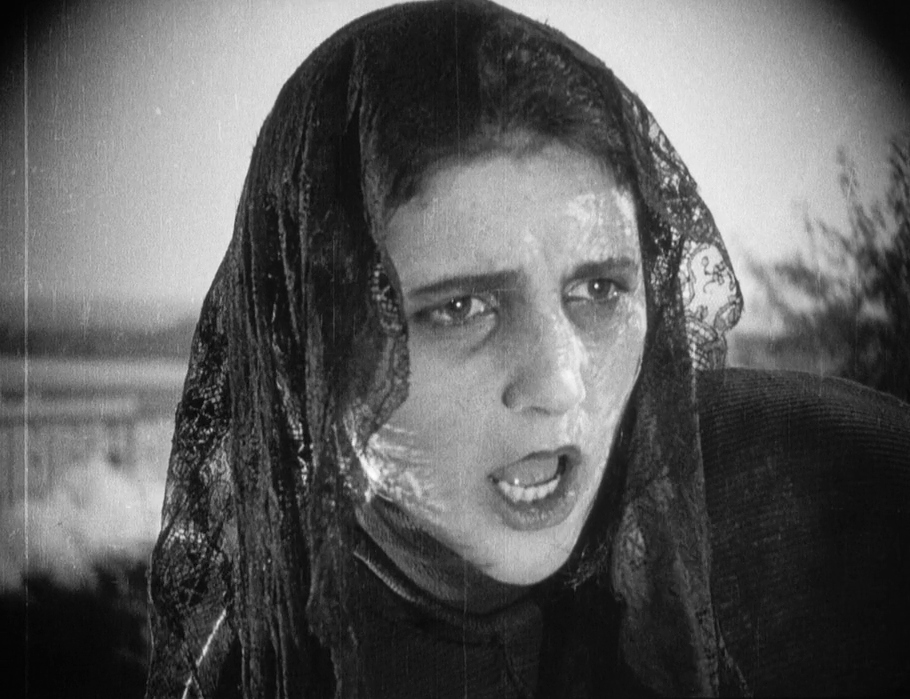
Beatrice Vitoldi

Beatrice Vitoldi (December 15, 1895 – November 1939) was a Soviet film actress born in Salerno, Italy.

Vitoldi is most famous for her only film role as the mother with the baby carriage in the Eisenstein film The Battleship Potemkin.

When she was five, her parents emigrated to Riga where her father worked as an engineer at the Russisch-Baltischen Waggonfabrik (later also known as Russo-Balt). The family later moved to Saint Petersburg where her father worked at a machine tool factory. Interested in both arts and politics, she met several Bolsheviks and was also introduced to Sergei Eisenstein (who incidentally also came to Saint Petersburg from Riga). Actively involved in the Bolshevik revolution, she worked later as a secretary for the Proletkult organization.

In 1925 in the Eisenstein film The Battleship Potemkin, she played the role that made her famous in the Soviet Union. In 1931 she became a Soviet attachée in Italy. In 1937 she was recalled to Moscow where she was arrested and tried during the Great Purge. As with many victims of the purge, the exact circumstances of her death are unknown.

In 1931, she was accredited Ambassador of the Soviet Union to Italy.
