= The Deserter (1933 film) =

1933 film

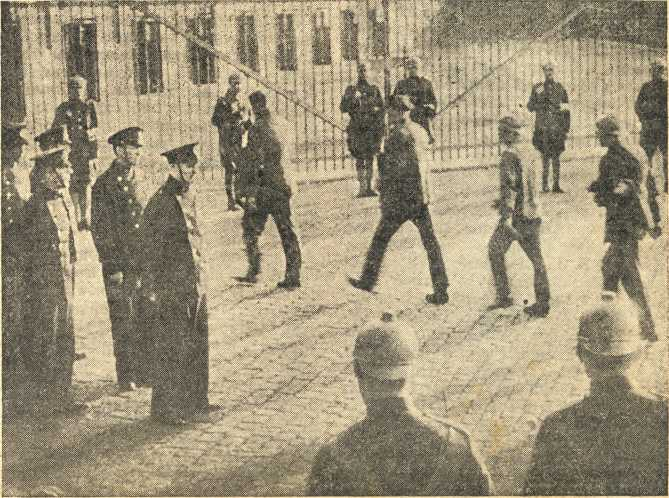
- Streikbrecher going to his workplace (scene from the film)
- Directed by: Vsevolod Pudovkin
- Written by: Nina Agadzhanova; M. Krasnostavsky; Aleksandr Lazebnikov
- Starring: Boris Livanov; Tamara Makarova; Sergey Martinson; Maksim Shtraukh; Sergei Gerasimov
- Cinematography: Anatoli Golovnya; Yuli Fogelman
- Edited by: I. Aravina; M. Usoltseva
- Music by: Yuri Shaporin
- Production company: Mezhrabpom
- Distributed by: Garrison Films Inc. (United States)
- Release date: 19 September 1933
- Running time: 103 minutes (2,818 meters)
- Country: Soviet Union
- Language: Russian

The Deserter (Russian: Дезертир, Dezertir) is a 1933 Soviet drama film directed by Vsevolod Pudovkin. It was his first sound picture. The film was originally rejected by the British Board of Film Censors, but was passed with an A certificate in 1941.

== Plot ==
The full film

Karl Renn, a Hamburg shipyard worker, is a member of the Communist Party of Germany and is commissioned by the Soviet Union to organize a general strike and exert pressure on employers. When the strike comes, several fights take place with the police. After a month of the strike, many workers are so exhausted that they become strikebreakers. An armed conflict breaks out, and even Karl's wife takes part in it; but he stays at home because of his cowardice. Nevertheless, as a delegate of the Party, he is sent together with four comrades to a meeting in the Soviet Union. He stays there, works in a blast furnace and is enthusiastic about the communist system. After a few weeks, he receives news that his Party Chief in Hamburg has been slain. He then travels back to Germany to continue the struggle of the workers.

== Cast ==
- Boris Livanov – Karl Renn
- Vasily Kovrigin – Ludwig Zelle
- Aleksandr Chistyakov – Fritz Müller
- Tamara Makarova – Greta Zelle
- Semyon Svashenko – Bruno
- Dmitry Konsovsky – Strauss
- Yudif Glizer – Marcella Zelle
- Sergey Martinson – Passerby
- Maksim Shtraukh – First bonze
- Sergei Gerasimov – Second bonze
- Sergey Komarov – Worker
- Vladimir Uralsky – Cell secretary

== Reception ==
Grigori Roshal praised the stylistic aspects of the film; "The pattern of shots attains such vividness, one shot flowing into another, becoming fused one with the other, that ordinary shots create an extraordinary impression." The New York Times gave a review which stated that "Pudovkin again demonstrates his ability to hold screen audiences, but be could have reduced the running time of "Deserter" by about fifteen minutes without lessening its value." Graham Greene's review for The Spectator described it as "a bad film with some superb moments", nevertheless he also wrote; "But the film should be seen: there are moments magnificent as well as naive..." Author and film critic Leonard Maltin awarded the film three and a half out of four stars, praising the film's visuals, and experimental use of sound, calling it "an essential visual and aural experience."
