= Russian torpedo boat Ismail =

Vessel of the Black Sea Fleet

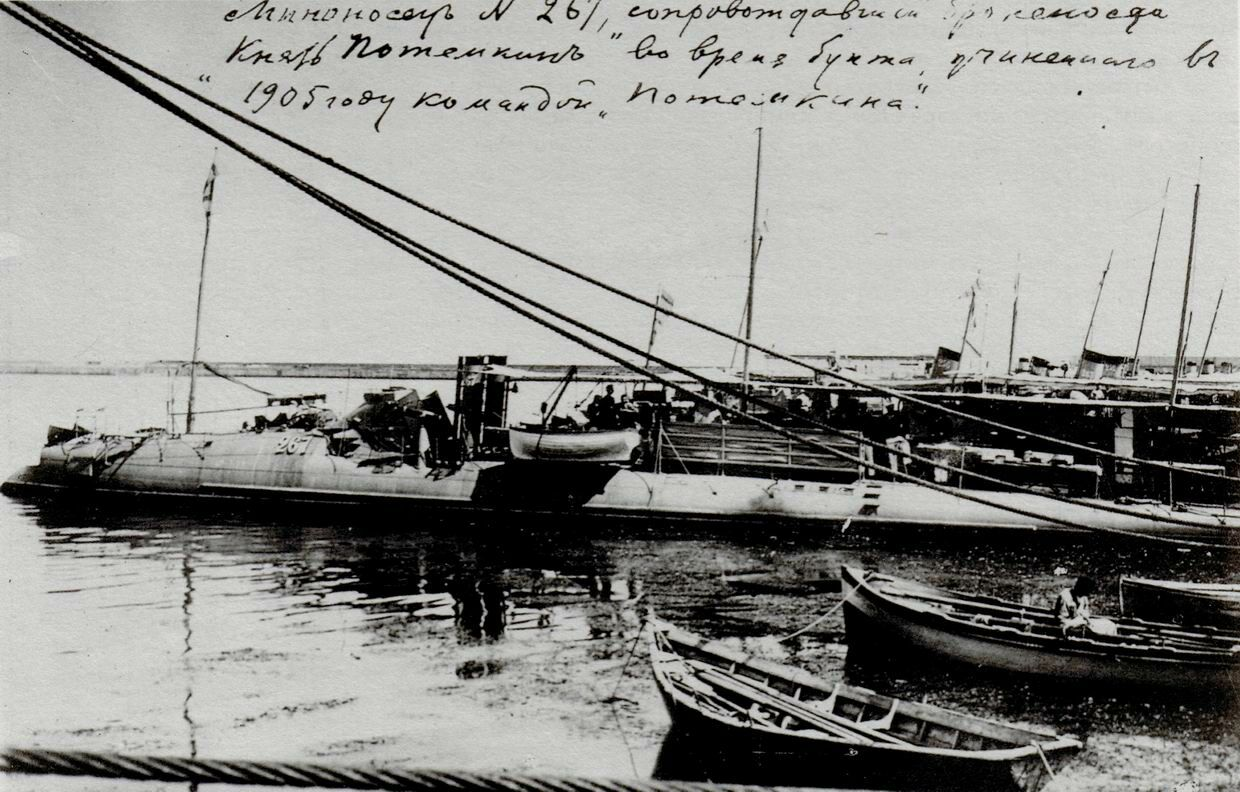
- Ismail in port

History

Russian Empire
- Name: Izmail / 267
- Builder: Nikolayev shipyard
- Launched: 1886
- Fate: Stricken 1908

General characteristics
- Class & type: Izmail class
- Displacement: 76 long tons (77 t)
- Length: 127 ft 7 in (38.89 m)
- Beam: 11 ft 7 in (3.53 m)
- Draught: 7 ft 6 in (2.29 m)
- Installed power: 296 ihp (221 kW)
- Propulsion: 1 shaft, vertical compound engine, 1 locomotive boiler
- Speed: 17.5 knots (32.4 km/h; 20.1 mph)
- Complement: 21
- Armament: 2 × 1 pdr revolvers; 2 × 15 in (381 mm) torpedo tubes

The Russian torpedo boat Ismail was the first ship in the Russian Navy's Black Sea Fleet to join the mutiny of the battleship Potemkin in 1905. The torpedo boat was Potemkin's escort and had on board a complement of three officers, 20 sailors, two 37 mm guns and two torpedo launchers. Ismail brought rotten meat aboard Potemkin in June 1905, an incident which sparked the mutiny. The commander of Ismail was Lieutenant Pyotr Klodt von Yurgensburg, a 41-year-old Russian nobleman.

== Specifications ==
Ismail had a top speed of 25 knots and was 127 feet long and 11 feet wide.

== Mutiny of Potemkin ==
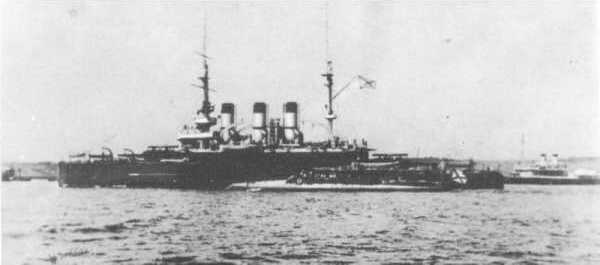
Ismail alongside Potemkin, 1905

During the mutiny of Potemkin on 27 June 1905 (according to the Western Calendar; 14 June 1905 according to the Julian Calendar), officers from the battleship swam for safety towards Ismail. Yurgensburg hesitated for 20 minutes before deciding to flee the scene, but Ismail was prevented from doing so when its mooring line became caught in the anchor. When the signalman informed Yurgensburg that his ship was being fired upon with rifles by sailors from Potemkin, he ignored a call to surrender but was eventually halted by three shots from Potemkin's guns, the last damaging the Ismail's funnel. Yurgensburg then surrendered without a fight. All the officers aboard Ismail were taken to Potemkin and replaced by five revolutionaries (two stokers, two machinists and a helmsman).

Ismail protected the two launches and 40 sailors who took part in the funeral of the revolutionary sailor Grigory Vakulinchuk in Odessa. The vessel also acted as a go-between when the battleship Georgii Pobedonosets briefly joined the uprising.

On 19 June (2 July in the Julian calendar) the torpedo boat accompanied Potemkin to the Romanian port of Constanța, where the battleship's captain asked for supplies from Romanian authorities. In the first hours of the following day, while the Romanian response was yet to come, Ismail tried to enter the Romanian port, but was shot at by the Romanian cruiser Elisabeta, which fired two shots in front of the torpedo boat to warn her off: first a blank charge then an explosive charge. Ismail returned to Potemkin and anchored next to the battleship. The Romanian response came several hours later, a refusal to give any supplies to the mutineers. The two warships subsequently left the port in the afternoon of that same day.

On 23 June (6 July in the Julian Calendar) there was an attempted counter mutiny when some sailors rushed the helm, wanting to return to Sevastopol. They failed in their attempt to seize control of Ismail and the torpedo boat accompanied Potemkin to Constanţa under tow. On 24 June (7 July), only two hours from their destination, a wave severed the towline; but Ismail stayed with Potemkin until she reached the Romanian port of Constanța.

Potemkin reached her destination at 23:00 on 7 July and the Romanians agreed to give asylum to the crew if they would disarm themselves and surrender the battleship. Ismail's crew decided the following morning to return to Sevastopol and turn themselves in, but Potemkin's crew voted to accept the terms. Captain Negru, commander of the port, came aboard at noon and hoisted the Romanian flag, then he allowed the battleship to enter the inner harbor.

== Bibliography ==
- Bascomb, Neal. Red Mutiny: Eleven Fateful Days on the Battleship Potemkin. New York, Houghton Mifflin, 2007. ISBN 0-618-59206-7.
- Chesneau, Roger and Eugene M. Kolesnik. Conway's All The World's Fighting Ships 1860–1905. London:Conway Maritime Press, 1979. ISBN 0-85177-133-5.
