= Moscow Group =

Menshevik organization in the Russian Revolution of 1905

The Moscow Group was Menshevik organisation based in Moscow during the 1905 Revolution. The Group was founded in the spring of 1905. Following the appearance of the Bulygin Constitution on 6 August 1905, the Moscow Group was unhappy that it proposed a purely consultative Duma elected by a highly restricted electorate from which workers would be excluded by means of property qualifications. They started agitating for the formation of the Moscow Soviet of 1905, as a broad base cross-party workers organisation, as had been agreed at their Geneva conference held in April 1905. Whereas the St Petersburg Soviet had been founded on 13 October 1905, the Moscow Soviet was formed later, but took on a major role in the Moscow uprising of 1905.
