= Tukums Uprising =

Uprising in Tukums
- Part of the Russian Revolution of 1905
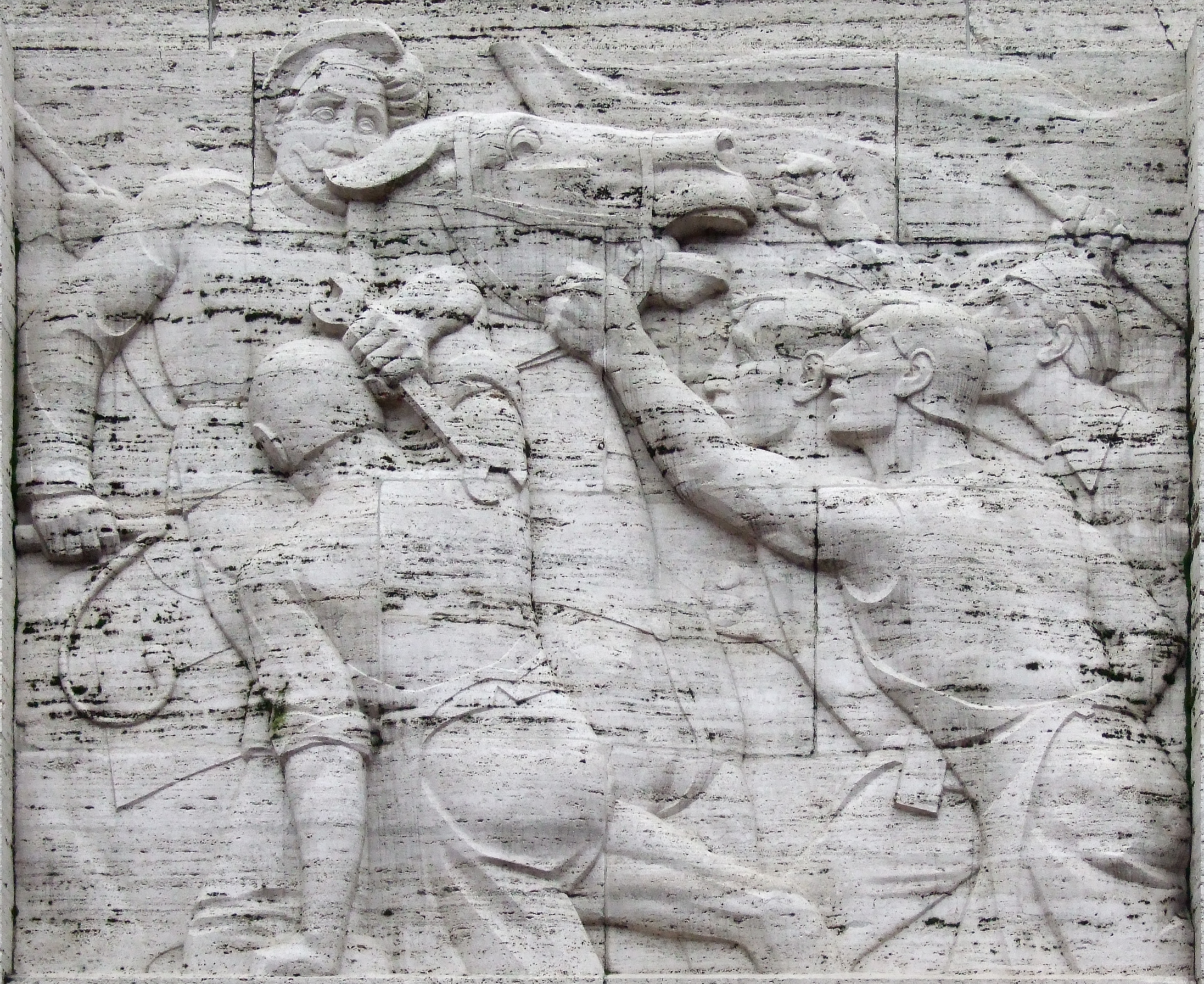
- A monument in honour of the events in the uprising
Date	13–16 December 1905
Location	Tukums, Russian Empire (at this day part of Latvia)
Result	Defeat of the rebels: Fall of the Tukums republic

Belligerents
LSDRP; Forest Brothers of Latvia; Local fighting workers	Russian Empire

Commanders and leaders
A. Erdans (POW); N. Tide (surrendered); P. Anskalis †; I. Peagle (surrendered); K. Vatsetis (surrendered); R. Revevsky (surrendered)	Nikola Pavlovich †; Alexander Alexandrovich

Strength
Around 2,000 armed rebels	More than 45 soldiers

Casualties and losses
100 rebels dead	39 killed and 28 wounded
- 37 rebels sentenced to death

The Tukums Uprising (in Latvian: Tukuma sacelšanās), also called the Tukums War, was an armed uprising against the Russian rule in the city of Tukums, today Latvia.

During the uprising, the rebels created a temporary republic: the Republic of Tukums. Although, the republic would last only for three days, before getting annexed back by the Russian Government.
