= Grigory Vakulenchuk =

Ukrainian sailor

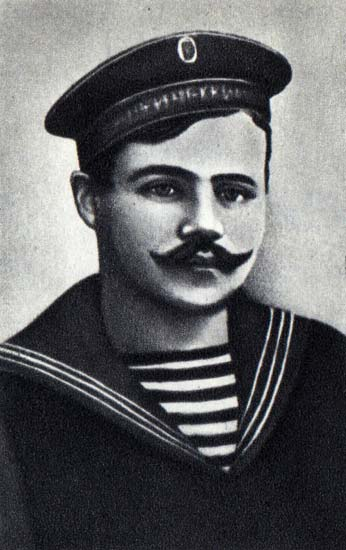
Vakulenchuk Grigoriy Mykytovych

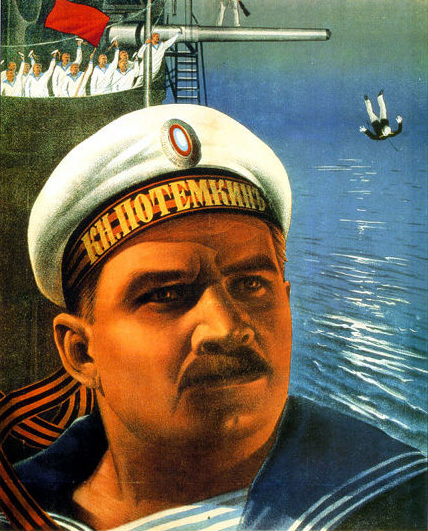
Antonov as Vakulenchuk

Grigory Nikitich Vakulenchuk (Russian: Григо́рий Ники́тич Вакуленчу́к, Ukrainian: Григо́рій Мики́тович Вакуленчу́к, romanized: Hryhorii Mykytovych Vakulenchuk, 1877– 14/27 June 1905) was a Ukrainian sailor in the Imperial Russian Navy. He was born in Velyki Korovyntsi (now in Zhytomyr Oblast). He served on the Russian battleship Potemkin.

He was one of nine children. He and his family worked in a sugar factory until the navy conscripted him. He learned to read in radical study circles. He became a member of a sailor patrol in Sevastopol so he could monitor radical meetings while pretending to bring them to light. Once he actually turned away two officers after saying he'd arrested a meeting of radicals the two men had found.

On 10/23 June 1905, he had attended a meeting of Tsentralka (the revolutionary sailors' organisation) and had argued in favour of an uprising: "To delay means to fail the revolution. At this moment, everywhere, workers and peasants are striking out. We must join the common fight." His powerful voice and long black moustache added to the effect of his words. On 11/24 June he convinced the Tsentralka leaders to let the Potemkin lead the Black Sea uprising.

After the crew discovered their meat was maggot-ridden, Vakulenchuk called for a boycott rather than a full uprising.

Chief Officer Giliarovsky was using marines to threaten the sailors into eating the meat. Vakulenchuk retreated behind a gun turret then handed out guns from the armoury when he saw 30 sailors were going to be executed. He aimed at Giliarovsky, but hit Lieutenant Neupokoyev instead. Giliarovsky shot him in the chest. He managed to disarm Giliarovsky when a petty officer shot him from behind. After the fight, he tried to stand but fell into the sea after which he was rescued and sent to the infirmary. His friend Afanasi Matushenko then led the mutiny. The red flag the sailors hoisted had been hidden on board by Vakulenchuk. Vakulenchuk had thought the mutiny premature because he wanted to wait until they were with the fleet. His funeral in Odessa two days later turned into a political demonstration. On his deathbed he asked for his savings (80 roubles) to be split between the sailors and his father. His last words were: "Don't throw it away, Afanasi."

His death and funeral are important incidents in Sergei Eisenstein's film Battleship Potemkin, where he was played by Aleksandr Antonov.
