= Ippolit Giliarovsky =

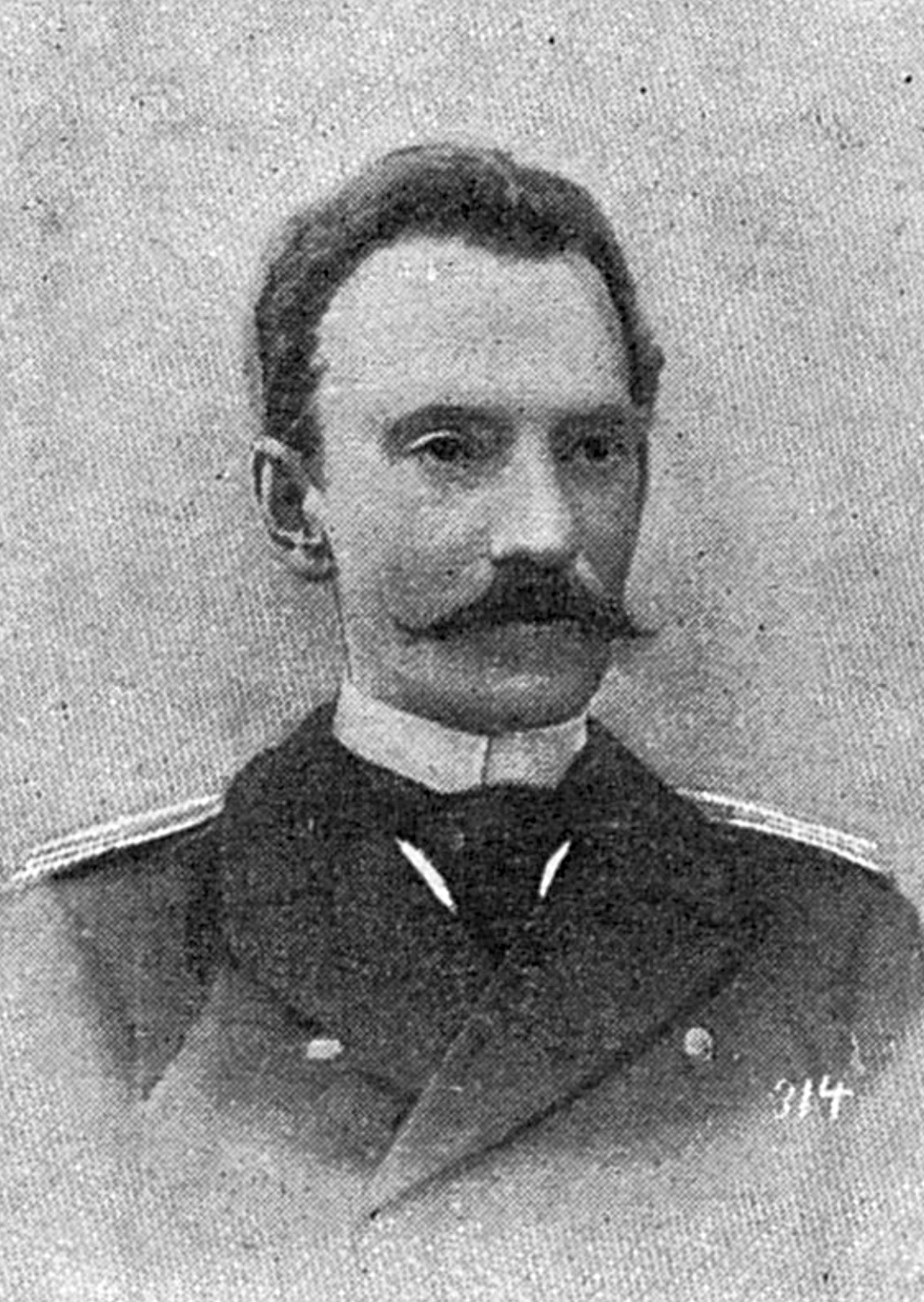
Ippolit Giliarovsky

Ippolit Giliarovsky (Russian: Ипполи́т Ива́нович Гиляро́вский; 18 August 1865 – 27 June 1905) was the second in command as a frigate captain of the battleship Potemkin during the mutiny. He held key responsibility for the uprising due to his brutal treatment of the sailors. Giliarovsky was killed during the mutiny.

== Early career ==
Born in Reval (in the Russian Governorate of Estonia) as the son of a Russian Orthodox priest, Ippolit Giliarovsky joined the Imperial Navy as a cadet in 1883. He was promoted from midshipman to artillery lieutenant in 1889. After serving as a naval artillery staff officer with the Baltic Fleet, Giliarovsky was appointed as a senior officer on the cruiser Gromoboy. He was decorated for his part in the Battle of Chemulpo Bay during the Russo-Japanese War. A strict disciplinarian, Giliarovsky routinely brutalised sailors under his command, once punching one of them in the face for not knowing his name.

On 18 October 1904 he was transferred to the position of second in command on the battleship Potemkin.

== On the Potemkin ==
Giliarovsky was made the executive officer on the Potemkin, a position which he interpreted as requiring spying on the crew and searching them regularly, along with administering punishment. Captain Evgeny Golikov (ru) actually complained to his superiors that Giliarovsky was too harsh.

On 27 June [O.S. 14 June] 1905, the crew refused borscht made with maggoty beef. Gilirovsky demanded to know why they were only eating bread and butter. He informed the ship's Doctor Smirnov. Smirnov said: "I already told them the meat is fine. The maggots are nothing more than larvae eggs that flies had laid there. They simply need to be washed away with salt and water. The cook did this on my instructions. If the crew continues to refuse to eat, then it is they who are spoiled. That's it." Gilirovsky then went to the captain, saying "We have to teach them a lesson." The captain summoned the crew, threatening any who didn't accept the borscht. Giliarovsky screamed "Come on, come on, hurry up!" but only 12 came forward. The executive officer ordered the boatswain to take the names of those who refused. The ship's marine guards (armed sailors) were called while the ordinary crewmen scattered. Giliarovsky then shouted: "So it's mutiny, is it? Alright, we know how to deal with that. If you think there's no discipline in the navy, I'll show you how wrong you are. Bosun, bring the tarpaulin." In the event of an on-board execution a tarpaulin was used to prevent the deck being stained.

Some sailors armed themselves while the majority milled in shocked confusion. Giliarovsky grabbed a rifle from one of the marine guards and ordered the remainder to shoot. The firing squad, however, refused to fire. Followed by a junior officer he rushed at Grigory Vakulinchuk, a revolutionary ring-leader. Vakulinchuk fired at the two officers, killing the lieutenant. Giliarovsky then shot Vakulinchuk in the chest. The wounded mutineer wrestled the rifle from Giliarovsky before being shot in the back by a petty officer. Another revolutionary, Afanasi Matushenko, fired at the officers and missed. Giliarovsky ordered the marine guards to shoot but they dispersed into the chaotic crowd on deck. Matushenko and two other sailors shot down Giliarovsky and another officer. Giliarovsky's last words were "I know you, you scoundrel. You may escape from the ship now, but I'll find you." He was tossed overboard by the sailors. Giliarovsky's body was found at sea by the marine transport Gonets in August 1905.

Seven of the eighteen officers on the Potemkin were killed during the brief violence of the actual mutiny. These included Giliarovsky, Captain Golikov and Doctor Smirnov. Two sailors were also killed. The surviving officers were eventually put ashore except for three who for varying reasons chose to remain with the ship.

Author Richard Hough gives a more favorable appraisal of Giliarovsky's orders during the mutiny. Hough argues that Giliarovsky took reasonable action to maintain order and discipline after the captain's weak response to the crew's refusal to eat the borscht. Giliarovsky's initial threat to shoot crew members was a bluff that exceeded his formal authority. When the majority of the crew under the leadership of Matushenko again refused to obey orders and became threatening, Giliarovsky felt compelled to try to carry through on his threat. According to Hough, "Discipline in the Imperial Navy was no more and no less severe than in the British or United States navies".

== Personal life ==
Giliarovsky was married with one young daughter. Both were travelling on the naval transport Vekha when it was taken by sailors from the Potemkin, while approaching Odessa. They were treated considerately by the mutineers and put ashore with the officers of the Vekha.
