= Afanasi Matushenko =

Russian revolutionary (1879–1907)

- Афанасий Николаевич Матюшенко
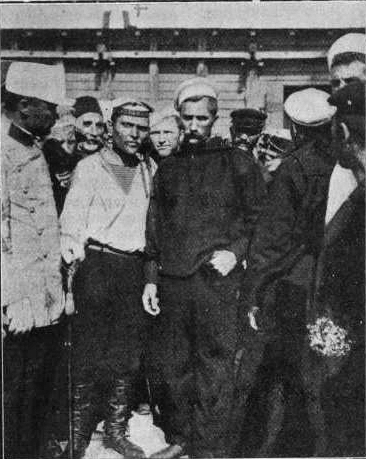
- Matushenko (white shirt), 1899
- Born: May 2, 1879; Derhachi, Russian Empire
- Died: November 2, 1907 (aged 28)
- Military career
- Allegiance: Russia
- Branch: Imperial Russian Navy
- Unit: Black Sea Fleet

Afanasy Nikolayevich Matushenko (Russian: Афана́сий Никола́евич Матюшенко; Ukrainian: Пана́с Микола́йович Матюшенко; 2 May 1879 – 2 November [O.S. October 20] 1907) was a Russian sailor. He was a non-commissioned officer in the Black Sea Fleet, revolutionary socialist, and ringleader of the mutiny on the Russian battleship Potemkin.

== Biography ==
He was born into a peasant family in the village of Derhachi (by some accounts – a cobbler family), eight miles (13 km) northwest of Kharkov. He lived in a tiny hut 15 feet squared, with his parents and five siblings. His father Nikolai was an ex-serf, earning money on the side as a cobbler. After the famine of 1891, Nikolai became an alcoholic. Afanasy, who had learned to read at the age of nine, had to take up cobbling when he was 12. Matushenko managed to finish a church parish school. Since his childhood, he was a friend of Hnat Khotkevych.

At 15, he ran away to Kharkov, became a railway oilman, and in 1896, he went to Odessa and became a coalman on a steamship that took him to Vladivostok, where he lived for two years as a railway machinist. In 1898, he became a docker at Rostov-on-Don, where he joined a Marxist study circle led by future Bolshevik Vladimir Petrov.

On his 21st birthday, Afanasy was conscripted for seven years into the Imperial Russian Navy and sent to Sevastopol for four months of training. The harsh discipline alienated him from the officers. After training, he went to Kronstadt, near St. Petersburg, where he finished a course in torpedo machinery. In 1902, he was promoted to quartermaster on the Battleship Potemkin. Here, he joined Tsentralka, the sailors' revolutionary organisation. Sailors looked up to him as a protector: "He would go through fire for his brother sailor", said one. On the morning of 10 June 1905, Tsentralka met on Malakhov hill, just outside Sebastopol. Over 100 sailors were there. In March, they had already written "The Resolution of the Black Sea sailors" calling for the end of Tsarism and a Constituent assembly. They agreed the Black Sea fleet would mutiny on 21 June, though Matushenko had wanted the mutiny to start immediately.

During the Potemkin mutiny, Matushenko took part in the killing of Captain Golikov and Ippolit Giliarovsky.

Together with other mutinous sailors Matushenko left the Potemkin when it docked in Constanza. Subsequently, he lived in exile in Romania, Switzerland, US (June 1906 – March 1907) and France (March–June 1907). In exile, he met with various socialist leaders: Vladimir Lenin, Christian Rakovsky, Vladimir Posse, Maxim Gorky, Georgy Gapon and Boris Savinkov. Matushenko was not a member of any political party and had no distinct political views. Some considered his views close to social-democrats, while other thought him closer to SRs or anarchists.

In June 1907, Matushenko returned to Russia under a false name. He was arrested by police, tried by a court in Sevastopol and sentenced to death. He was executed by hanging on 2 November 1907.
