= Aleksandr Antonov (actor) =

Soviet actor (1898–1962)

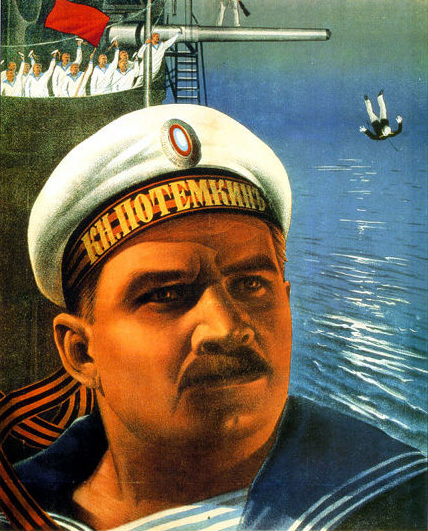
- Film poster of Antonov
- Born: Aleksandr Pavlovich Antonov; 13 February 1898; Moscow, Russia
- Died: 26 November 1962 (aged 64); Moscow, USSR
- Years active: 1923-1957

Aleksandr Pavlovich Antonov (Russian: Александр Павлович Антонов; 13 February 1898 – 26 November 1962) was a Soviet film actor who had a lengthy career, stretching from the silent era to the 1950s. Antonov was named Merited Artist of the Russian Federation in 1950.

Antonov was a member of the Moscow Proletarian Culture Theater between the years 1920–1924 when he met Sergei Eisenshtein, who cast him in his directorial debut short film Glumov's Diary (1923) and in his first full-length feature Strike (1924). Eisenshtein then gave Antonov the part of Bolshevik leader Grigory Vakulinchuk in The Battleship Potemkin (1925), which remains his best known role.

Antonov continued his career into both the late silent and the sound period where he usually played episodic character actor roles of either proletarians or sailors. He worked with leading directors, including Ivan Pyryev on A Rich Bride (1938), Vsevolod Pudovkin on Suvorov (1941), Mikhail Romm on Secret Mission (1950), and Yuli Raizman on Dream of a Cossack (1950).

== Filmography ==
- Glumov's Diary (1923) as Joffre
- Strike (1925) as member of strike committee
- Battleship Potemkin (1925) as Grigory Vakulinchuk (Bolshevik sailor)
- The Wind (1926) as sailor
- A Girl with a Temper (1939) as Mehkov, director of the animal-breeding sovkhoz
- Suvorov (1941) as Colonel Tyurin, commander of the Azov regiment
- The Murderers are Coming (1942) as Müller, German soldier
- Six P.M. (1944) as commander
- Girl No. 217 (1945) as German soldier (uncredited)
- The Young Guard (1948) as Ignat Fomin, Hilfspolizei
- The Battle of Stalingrad (1949) as Colonel Popov
- Dream of a Cossack (1951) as spring worker
- Incident in the Taiga (1953)
- Twelfth Night (1955) as Sea Captain
- The White Poodle (1956) as yardman
- A Weary Road (1956) as Raissa's Father
