= Strike (1925 film) =

1925 film by Sergei Eisenstein

- 1925 poster by Anton Lavinsky
- Directed by: Sergei Eisenstein
- Written by: Grigori Aleksandrov; Ilya Kravchunovsky; Sergei Eisenstein; Valerian Pletnev
- Produced by: Boris Mikhin
- Starring: Grigori Aleksandrov; Maksim Shtraukh; Mikhail Gomorov
- Cinematography: Eduard Tisse; Vladimir Popov; Vasili Khvatov
- Edited by: Sergei Eisenstein
- Production company: 1st Goskino Factory
- Distributed by: Goskino
- Release date: 28 April 1925
- Running time: 82 minutes
- Country: Soviet Union
- Languages: Silent film Russian intertitles

Strike (Russian: Стачка, romanized: Stachka) is a 1925 Soviet silent propaganda film directed and edited by Sergei Eisenstein. Originating as one entry out of a proposed seven-part series titled "Towards Dictatorship of the Proletariat", Strike was a joint collaboration between the Proletcult Theatre and the film studio Goskino. As Eisenstein's first full-length feature film, it marked his transition from theatre to cinema, and his next film Battleship Potemkin emerged from the same film cycle.

Arranged in six parts, the film depicts a strike in 1903 by the workers of a factory in pre-revolutionary Russia, and their subsequent suppression. It is best known for a sequence towards the climax, in which the violent suppression of the strike is cross-cut with footage of cattle being slaughtered, and similar animal metaphors are used throughout the film to describe various individuals.

Upon release, Strike received praise from critics, but many audiences were confused by its eccentric style. It received little international distribution until its reappraisal during the 1950s and 1960s. It is now recognized as one of Eisenstein's more accessible works and a major influence on many of his contemporaries.

== Plot ==
Strike, with English intertitles.

The film opens with a quotation from Vladimir Lenin:

The strength of the working class is organization. Without organization of the masses, the proletarian is nothing. Organized it is everything. Being organized means unity of action, unity of practical activity.

На заводе всё спокойно / At the factory all is quiet

Using typography, the word "но" (but) is added to the title of the chapter which then animates and dissolves into an image of machinery in motion. The administration is spying on the workers, reviewing a list of agents with vivid code names. Vignettes are shown of them. Conditions are tense with agitators and Bolsheviks planning a strike prior to the catalytic event.

Повод к стачке / Reason to strike

A micrometer with a value equaling three weeks' pay is stolen from the factory. A worker, Yakov, is accused of the theft and subsequently hangs himself. Fighting ensues and work stops. The workers leave the milling room running and resistance is met at the foundry. The strikers throw rocks and loose metal through the foundry windows. Locked within the gates of the complex, the crowd confronts the office. They force open the gates, seize the manager, and then cart him and the foreman off in a wheel barrow before dumping them down a hill into water.

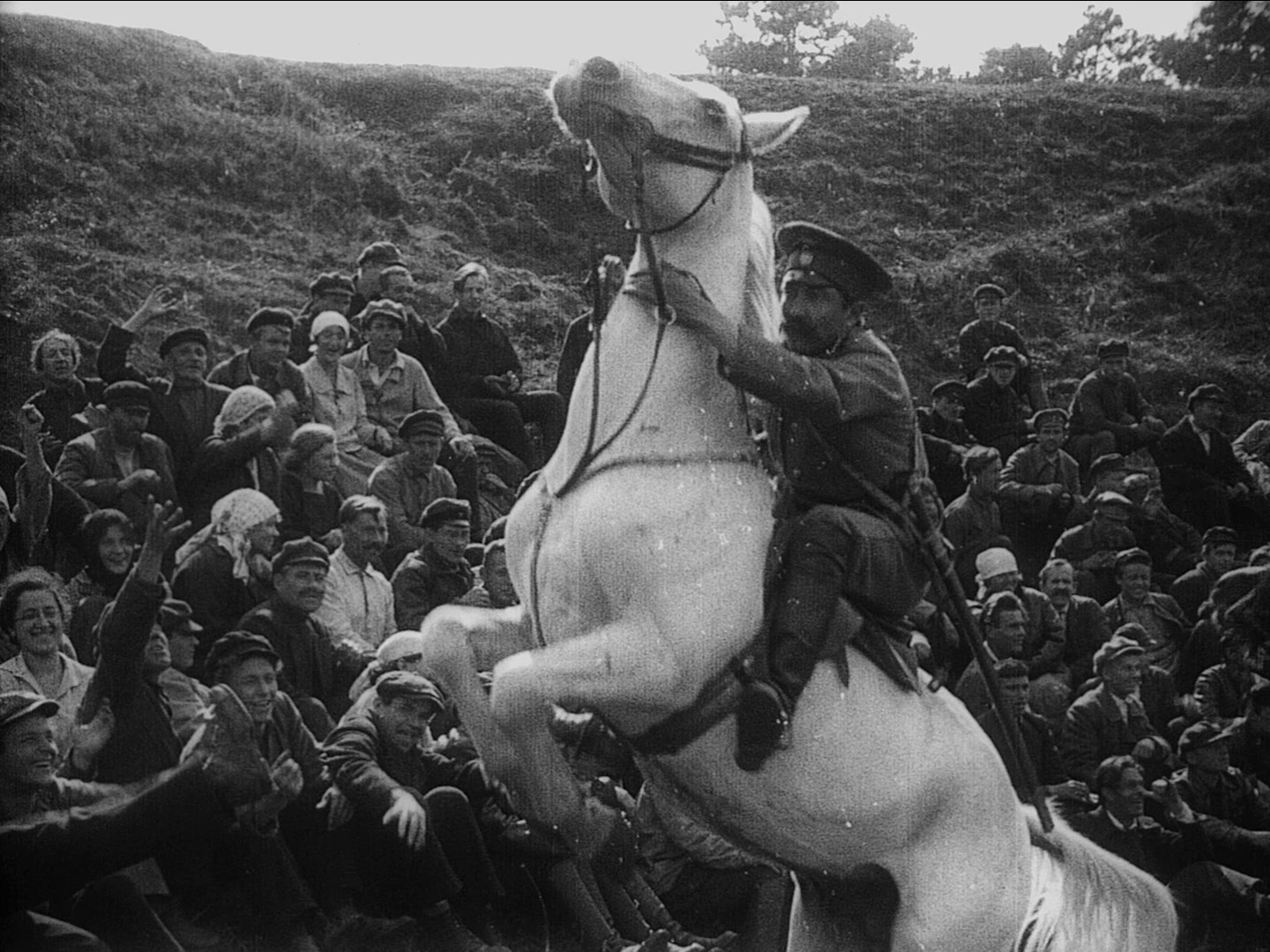
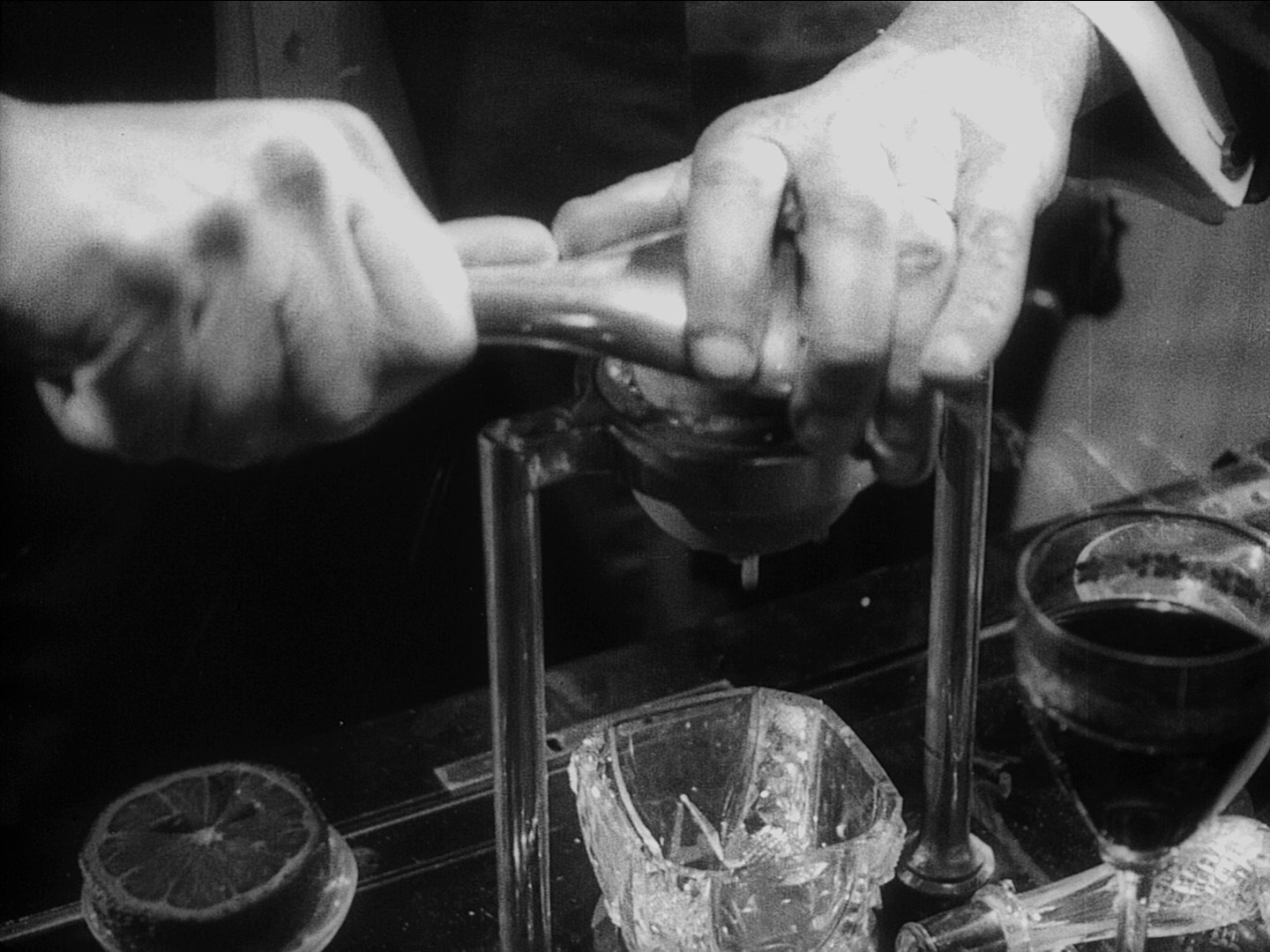
A police officer conducts a raid on the workers (top) as a stockholder squeezes the juice of a lemon (bottom).

Завод замер / The factory dies down

A child wakes his father for work, ironically with no work to do; they laugh and frolic. The factory is vacant and still, with birds moving in. The children wheelbarrow a goat in a mob, acting out what their fathers had done. The owner is frustrated by orders arriving and the frozen plant. The workers formulate their demands: an 8-hour work day, fair treatment by the administration, 30% wage increases, and a 6-hour day for minors. The shareholders meet with the director, and they discuss the demands dismissively while smoking cigars and having drinks. Presumably on their orders, the police raid the workers, and the workers sit down to protest. At their meeting the shareholders use the demand letter as a rag to clean up a spill, and a lemon squeezer metaphorically represents the pressure they intend to apply to the strikers.

Стачка затягивается / The strike draws out

Scenes are shown of a line forming at a factory store which is closed, and a baby needing food. A fight occurs at a home between a man and a woman; subsequently she leaves. Another man rummages through his home for goods to sell at a flea market, upsetting his family. A posted letter publicly shows the administrators' rejection of the demands. Using a hidden camera in a pocket watch, a spy named "Owl" photographs a strike leader stealing the letter. The pictures are transferred to another spy. The strike leader is beaten, captured, and beaten again.

Провокация на разгром / Provocation and debacle

The scene opens with dead cats dangling from a structure. A tsarist police agent strikes a deal with a "King of Thieves", whose throne is made of a derelict automobile amidst rubbish, and who leads a community that lives in enormous barrels buried with only their top openings above ground. He hires a few provocateurs from among his community to set fire, raze, and loot a state liquor depot in the factory district. A crowd of workers gather at the fire and the alarm is sounded. They leave to avoid being provoked, but are set upon by the firemen with their hoses regardless.

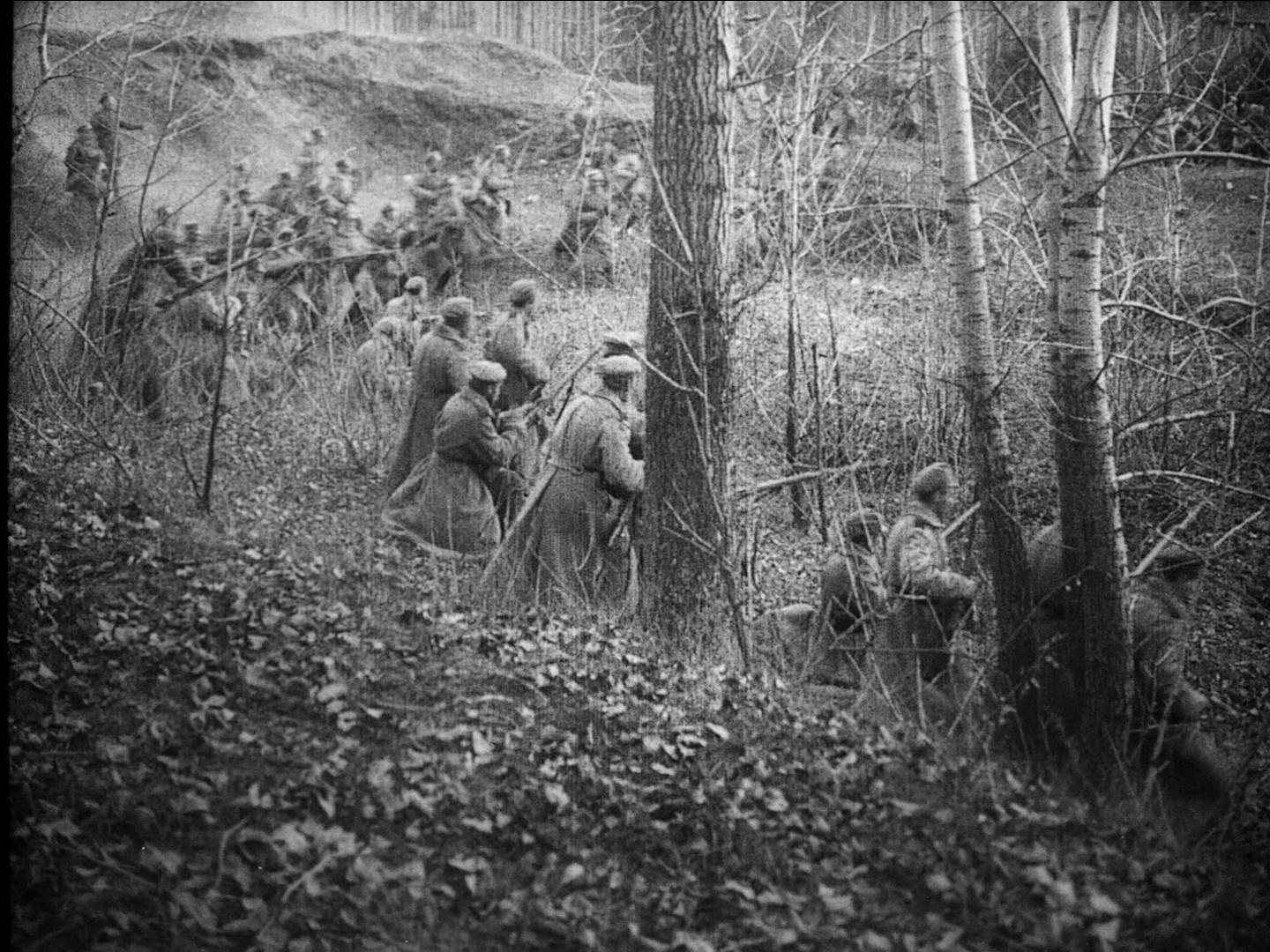
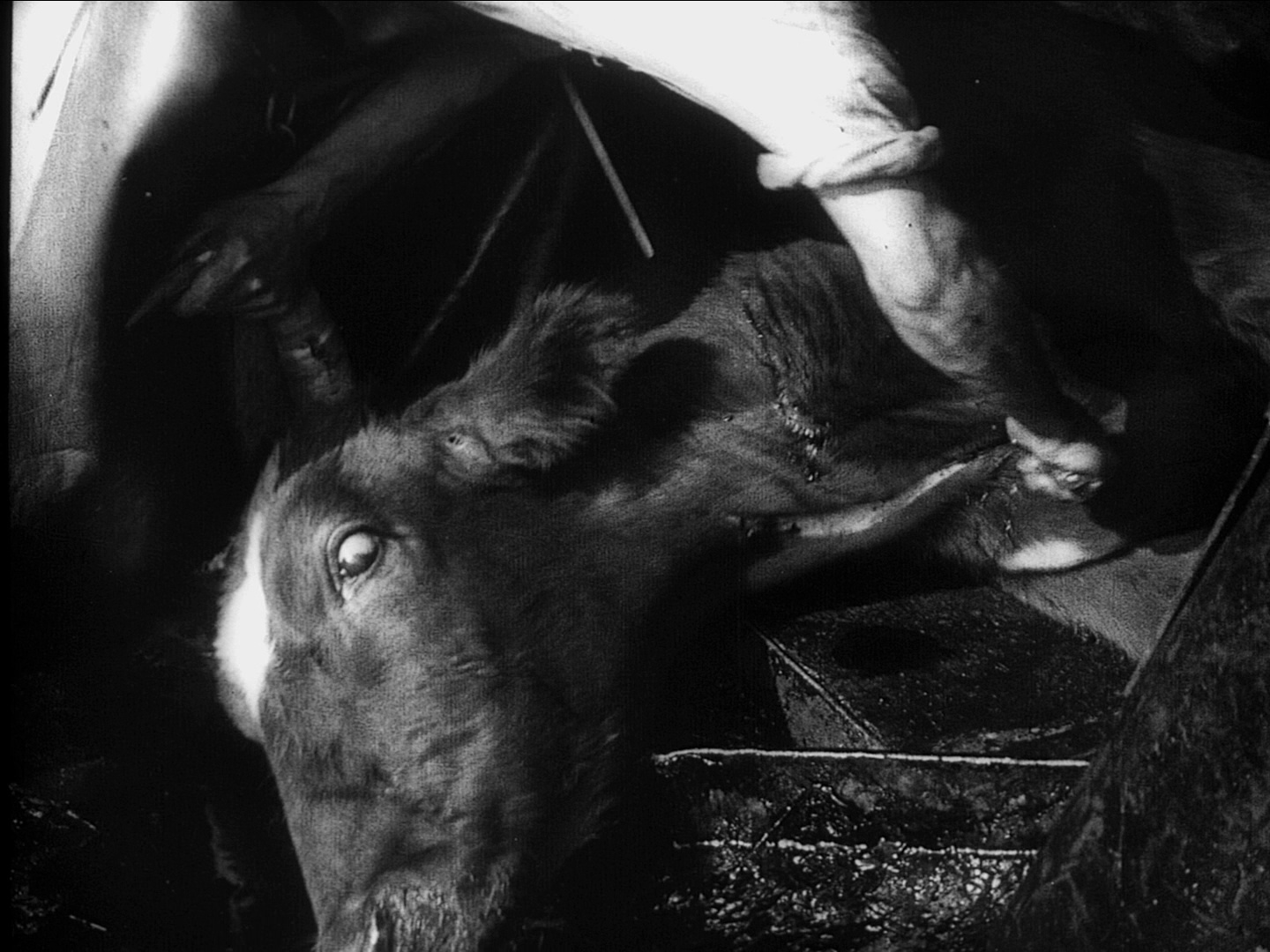
Wide shots of fleeing crowds (top) are edited with close-ups of a bull being slaughtered (bottom).

Ликвидация / Extermination

The governor sends in the military. A child wanders off to the soldiers and his mother is struck when she goes to fetch him. Rioting commences, and the crowd is chased off through a series of gates and barriers heading to the forge, then their apartments. The police pursues and attacks them on the balconies, and one policeman murders a small child. The workers are then driven into a field by the army and shot en masse. The sequence is shown with alternating footage of the slaughtering of a cow.

== Cast ==
- Maksim Shtraukh — Police spy
- Grigori Aleksandrov — Factory foreman
- Mikhail Gomorov — Worker
- I. Ivanov — Chief of police
- Ivan Klyukvin — Revolutionary
- Aleksandr Antonov — Member of strike committee
- Yudif Glizer — Queen of thieves
- Vladimir Uralsky (as V. Uralsky)
- Anatoli Kuznetsov
- Vera Yanukova
- Misha Mamin

== Production ==
=== Development ===
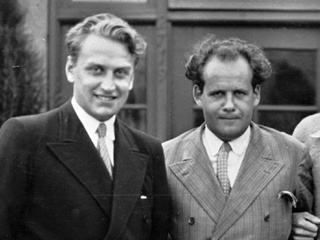
Co-writer Grigori Aleksandrov (left) with director Sergei Eisenstein (right)

Prior to Strike, Eisenstein had primarily worked in experimental theatre, as a designer and director with the Proletcult Theatre. Boris Mikhin, head of the First Goskino factory, wanted to recruit Eisenstein to work in cinema, but Proletcult wanted to keep him. They negotiated and decided on a joint collaboration, a film cycle called "Towards Dictatorship of the Proletariat". The cycle was to be a historical panorama focused on lessons learned by the Russian working class during the pre-revolutionary period, through political activities such as strikes and underground publications. It had seven parts: Geneva-Russia, Underground, May Day, 1905, Strike, Prison Riots and Escapes, and October.

Of those, 1905 and Strike were identified as having mass appeal. Strike was selected to enter production first as a joint production between Proletcult and Goskino. One of the episodes from 1905 would later be expanded to form Eisenstein's second feature, Battleship Potemkin. The screenplay was written by Valerian Pletnyov, Grigori Aleksandrov, Ilya Kravchunovsky, and Eisenstein. They used memoirs of the Bolsheviks and troves of historical documents as source material for the script.

=== Pre-production ===
Studio head Boris Mikhin introduced Eisenstein to cinematographer Eduard Tisse, who had started his career as a newsreel cameraman during the Civil War. Eisenstein spent several months researching labor struggles. He interviewed strikers and activists, visited factories, and read Émile Zola's novel Germinal. He worked on the script with Esfir Shub at her house; however, after it was officially accepted he removed her from the project.

Eisenstein cast many of the roles from the Proletcult Theatre. Actors and students from the studio filled other parts, and crowd scenes were populated by factory workers from Moscow.

=== Filming ===
Production began in early 1924. The board of Goskino was afraid that Eisenstein would produce a plotless "montage of attractions". They had him begin with test shoots conducted at their studio on Zhitnaya Street in Moscow. After two days of test shoots, the board decided to remove Eisenstein from the project. Only after Mikhin and Tisse personally guaranteed the film's completion was Eisenstein given a third test shoot and allowed to continue with production. During filming, he continued to quarrel with the studio over enormous demands, such as a thousand extras to form a mob in a scene from part five. Much of the crew resented him over the stringent production process, but Eisenstein was generally unaware.

== Style and themes ==
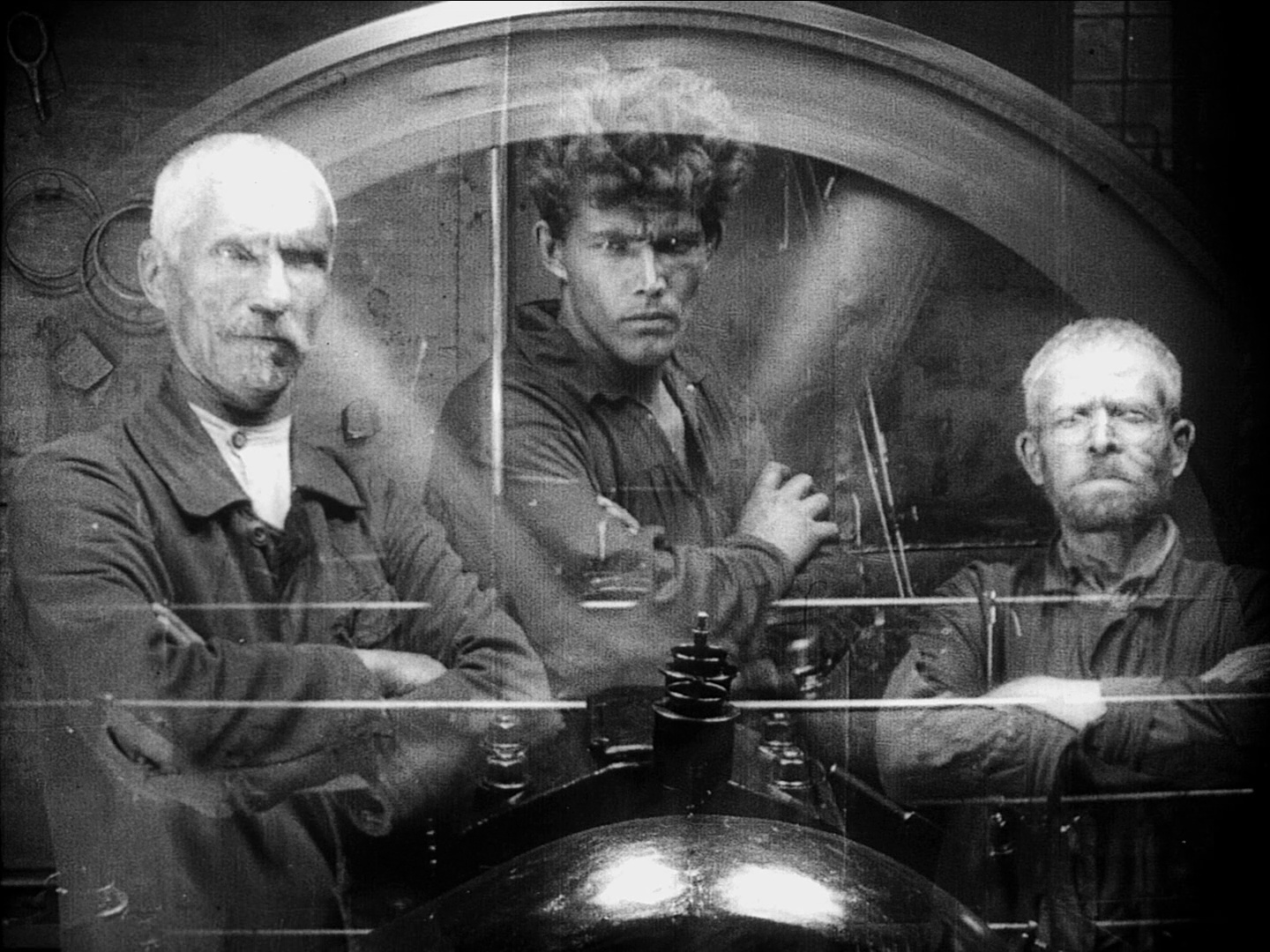
Wheels are a recurring visual motif often linked to the workers.

Strike applies Eisenstein's principle of "montage of attractions". Developed during his work in theatre, the principle stipulates that each moment of a work should be filled with surprise and intensity. His influential essay, Montage of Attractions, was written between production and premiere.

Eisenstein's editing is rapid, even compared to other Soviet filmmakers of the era. Strike has an average shot length of 2.5 seconds, less than half that of a typical Hollywood film. Dissolves, traditionally used to indicate the passage of time between shots, are used instead as a visual effect. In some scenes, the aspect ratio is dynamic, with masks in front of the camera being added or removed to change the framing of a shot. The film also makes use of multiple exposures and iris shots.

Eisenstein uses multiple visual motifs that, after being established with one side of the conflict, change over the course of the narrative arc. Early on, animal identities distinguish the police spies, and pushing a goat in a wheelbarrow is equated to throwing out the factory manager. At the end of the film, shots of a bull being slaughtered are used to symbolize violence against the workers. Images of puddles and swimming link water to the workers early in the film. Later on, a heavy rain appears during the capture of the first leader, and firemen attack the workers with large jets of water. Circular shapes are originally associated with the workers, through images of spinning flywheels and turbines. During the strike the wheels are stopped, and the motif reappears as the barrels in which the provocateurs live and the wheels of the fire truck.

== Release ==
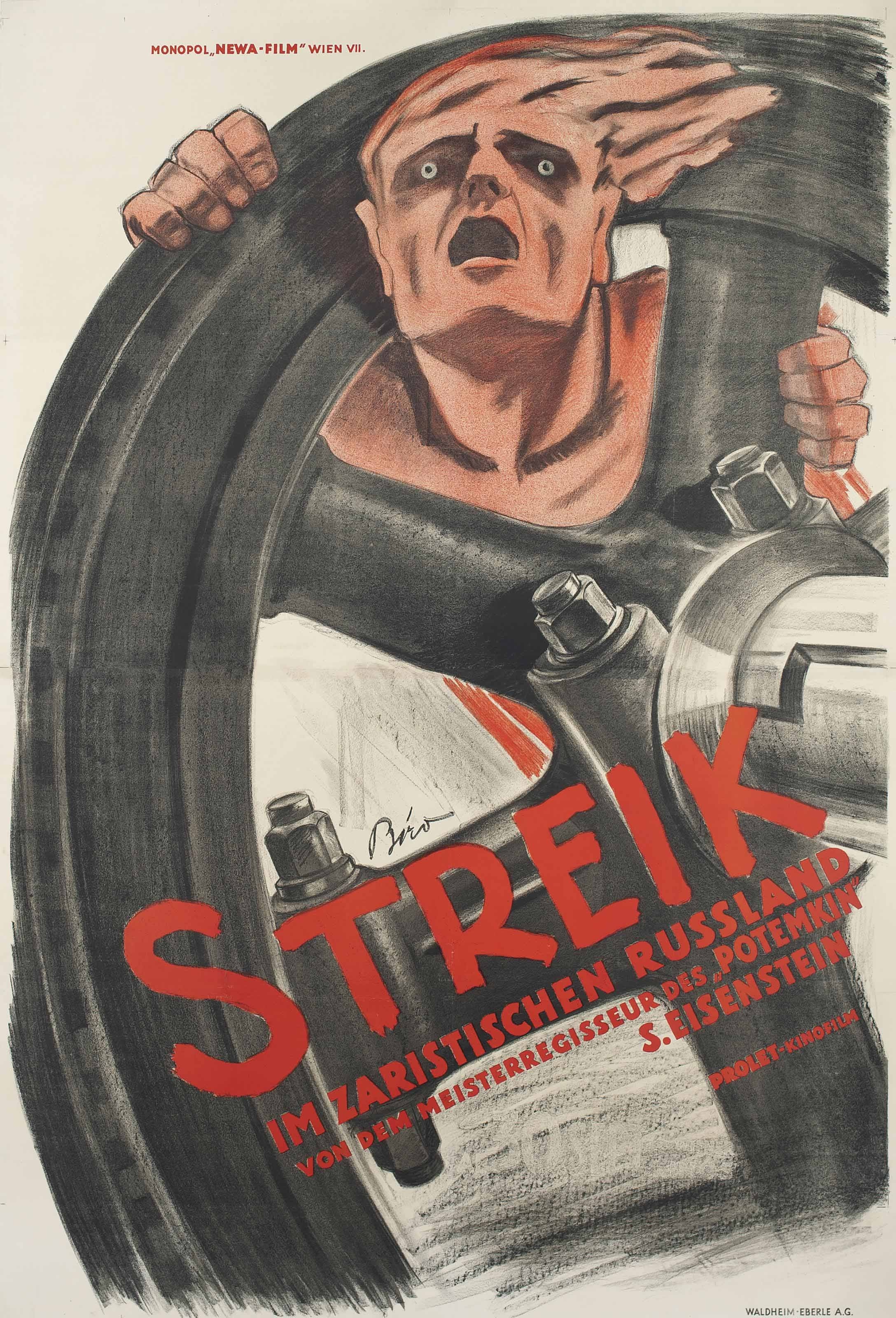
A poster by Mihály Biró for the film's release in Austria

Although Strike was completed in late 1924, its release was delayed because of a shortage of positive film stock. The film premiered in Leningrad on 1 February 1925. It had a public viewing on 9 March and had a theatrical release on 28 April. In the years after its initial release, Strike received little international distribution, only to Germany and Austria. The film was re-released in 1967 with a musical score.

== Reception ==
For Pravda, Mikhail Koltsov called Strike "the first revolutionary creation of our cinema." However, public reaction to the film was mixed, particularly regarding its satire and grotesquerie. Proletcult officials attacked the film's "superfluous, self-directed formalism and gimmickry". Authorities were critical of its eccentricity and the relation between its ideological content and form.

At the 1925 International Exhibition of Modern Decorative and Industrial Arts in Paris, Eisenstein was awarded a gold medal for Strike. After the film's first British screening in 1956, Ivor Montagu noted the combination of realism and "fantastic clowning, remarking that, "there springs a lavish shower of fireworks: violations of every canon, experiments in method, such an abundance of trial runs as was never dreamed of in cinema before or seen since in a single work; diabolical and wavering changes of mood…everything in such overpowering quantity". In the New Statesman, David Sylvester likened its rhythmic editing to T. S. Eliot's poem The Waste Land, writing that "it operates through…scattered images, each of them precisely concrete yet also symbolic, the juxtaposition of which startles and surprises."

Western cinema audiences rediscovered Strike during the mid 1960s, appreciating its vibrant eccentricity. In a review for Les Temps modernes, Christian Zimmer described the film as "a memory of future fusillades". Geoff Andrew of Time Out called it Eisenstein's "most watchable" film, adding that "the harshly beautiful imagery…roots the movie effortlessly in down-to-earth reality, but its relentless energy and invention transform the whole thing into a raucous, rousing hymn to human dignity and courage."

On the review aggregator website Rotten Tomatoes, 100% of 8 critics' reviews are positive, with an average rating of 9.2/10.

== Legacy ==
The film was an influence on directors Alexander Dovzhenko and Fridrikh Ermler. Its innovations were embraced by the Factory of the Eccentric Actor group, with director Grigori Kozintsev saying, "We must all see Strike again and again, until we can understand it and adopt its power for our own."

Francis Bacon cited Strike (and Battleship Potemkin) as significant influences on his painting.

In the United States, Strike is now part of Anthology Film Archives' Essential Cinema Repertory collection.

Francis Ford Coppola revives/quotes the slaughtering of the cow metaphor at the end of Apocalypse Now (1979).

== Works cited ==
- Bergan, Ronald (1997), Sergei Eisenstein: A Life in Conflict, Woodstock, New York: The Overlook Press, ISBN 0-87951-924-X.
- Bordwell, David (1993), The Cinema of Eisenstein, Cambridge, MA: Harvard University Press, ISBN 978-0-674-13138-5.
- Leyda, Jay (1960), Kino: A History of the Russian and Soviet Film, New York: Macmillan, hdl:2027/mdp.39015003853564, OCLC 1683826.
- Leyda, Jay; Voynow, Zina (1982), Eisenstein at Work, New York: Pantheon, ISBN 978-0-394-74812-2.
- Yurenev, Rostislav, ed. (1974), Эйзенштейн в воспоминаниях современников [Eisenstein in the Memoirs of Contemporaries] (in Russian), Iskusstvo.
