= ¡Que viva México! (unfinished film) =

¡Que Viva México! - Da zdravstvuyet Meksika!
- Italian poster
- Directed by: Sergei Eisenstein
- Written by: Sergei Eisenstein (original screenplay) and Grigori Aleksandrov (additional material)
- Produced by: Upton Sinclair; Mary Craig Sinclair; Otto Kahn; Kate Crane Gratz
- Narrated by: Sergei Bondarchuk
- Distributed by: Mosfilm
- Release date: November 1979 (U.S.)
- Running time: 90 minutes

¡Que viva México! ([ke ˈβi.βa ˈme.xi.ko], "Long Live Mexico!"; Russian: Да здравствует Мексика!, romanized: Da zdravstvuyet Meksika!) is a film project begun in 1930 by the Russian avant-garde director Sergei Eisenstein (1898–1948) under contract to socialist author Upton Sinclair and other supporters in the United States. It would have been an episodic portrayal of Mexican culture and politics from pre-Conquest civilization to the Mexican Revolution. Production was beset by difficulties and was eventually abandoned. Jay Leyda and Zina Voynow call it Eisentein's "greatest film plan and his greatest personal tragedy".

== Overview ==
Eisenstein had come to the United States to work on a film for Paramount Pictures, but, after various projects proposed by Charlie Chaplin and Paramount executives fell through, Paramount released him from his contract. Eisenstein would thereupon have been obliged to return to the USSR, but Upton Sinclair and a small group of financiers recruited by him and his wife Mary Craig Kimbrough Sinclair intervened on Eisenstein's behalf, inviting him to make a film for them of his own devising. Under a legal corporation these investors formed, the Mexican Film Trust, Eisenstein contracted with them to make a film about Mexico, and left the United States for that country. The contract with Eisenstein called for a short, apolitical feature film about or involving Mexico, in a scenario to be designed and filmed by Eisenstein and his two compatriots, Grigori Alexandrov and Eduard Tisse. Other provisos of the contract, which Eisenstein signed on 24 November 1930, included that the film would be completed (including all post-production work) by April 1931, and would show or imply nothing that could be construed as insulting to or critical of post-Revolution Mexico (a condition imposed by the Mexican government before it would allow the three Soviets entry into their country). Filmed material was also to be subject to censorship by the Mexican government, at first after it was filmed and printed, later in 1931 during shooting via an on-site censor. Mary Sinclair's brother, Hunter Kimbrough, accompanied the three Russian filmmakers to Mexico to represent the Trust during filming.

Eisenstein shot somewhere between 175,000 and 250,000 linear feet of film (30 to 50 hours) before the Mexican Film Trust stopped production, the Trust having run out of money and patience with Eisenstein's unwillingness/inability to complete the film expeditiously, and Eisenstein having received orders for his "speediest return" to the USSR from Soyuzkino, from which he had been absent since 1929. Although the original intent was for Eisenstein to proceed from Mexico to California and edit the film he had taken, he was not allowed to re-enter the United States by the Department of Immigration, nor later could any agreement be reached by the Trust with Soyuzkino which would have allowed the footage be sent to the USSR for completion by him there.

Through Sinclair, the Mexican Film Trust attempted to arouse interest from a major American motion picture concern to finish the film. After months of failure to find any such interested in the property, the Trust finally contracted with independent producer-distributor Sol Lesser to produce two short features and a short subject culled from the footage, Thunder Over Mexico, Eisenstein in Mexico, and Death Day; these were all released in 1934.

Later, others, with the Trust's permission, attempted different versions, such as Marie Seton's Time in the Sun (1939). The title ¡Que viva México!, originally proposed by Eisenstein in correspondence with Upton Sinclair during the last months of shooting, was first used for a version made by Grigori Alexandrov, which was co-edited by Alexandrov and Esfir Tobak and released in 1979, about a decade after the footage was sent to the USSR by the Museum of Modern Art in exchange for several Soviet films from the Gosfilmofond film archive. The film was awarded with the Honorable Golden Prize at the 11th Moscow International Film Festival in 1979. Alexandrov's 85-minute ¡Que viva México! restoration was released to DVD in 2001 by Kino Video In 1998, Oleg Kovalov released his free version "Mexican Fantasy", and another has been proposed during the first years of the 21st century.

== Eisenstein and Mexico ==
In the early 20th century, many intellectuals and artists associated with the European avant garde were fascinated by Latin America in general, and by Mexico in particular: for the French artist and leader of the Surrealist movement André Breton, for instance, Mexico was almost the incarnation of Surrealism. As film historian David Bordwell notes, "like many Leftists, Eisenstein was impressed that Mexico has created a socialist revolution in 1910". His fascination with the country dated back at least to 1921, when at the age of twenty-two "his artistic career started with a Mexican topic" as he put on a theatrical version of the Jack London story The Mexican in Moscow. Film scholar Inga Karetnikova details this production as a classic example of avant-garde aesthetics, an exercise in form rather than documentary realism; but "indirectly", she argues, "he did recreate the Mexican atmosphere". Above all, he saw in the Mexican revolution an instance of a "zealous idealism" that was also "close to Eisenstein, just as it was to the entire generation of Soviet avant-garde of the early 1920s".

Some years later, in 1927, Eisenstein had the opportunity to meet the Mexican muralist Diego Rivera, who was visiting Moscow for the celebrations of the Russian revolution's tenth anniversary. Rivera had seen Eisenstein's film Battleship Potemkin, and praised it by comparing it to his own work as a painter in the service of the Mexican revolution; he also "spoke obsessively of the Mexican artistic heritage", describing the wonders of Ancient Aztec and Mayan art and architecture. The Russian director wrote that "the seed of interest in that country . . . nourished by the stories of Diego Rivera, when he visited the Soviet Union . . . grew into a burning desire to travel there".

== Plot summary ==
=== Original vision ===
There is no evidence that Eisenstein had any specific idea for a film about or set in Mexico before his actual arrival there in December 1930, although he began shooting almost immediately. The Sinclairs had made it clear that they were expecting Eisenstein to concentrate on visual imagery, and anything by way of a plot would be secondary: they were looking for an artistic travelogue. Furthermore, although the film was to have been completed by April 1931, it wasn't until about that time that Eisenstein even settled on the basic idea of a multi-part film, an anthology with each part focused on a different subculture of the Mexican peoples. Only later still would this idea resolve itself into the concept of a six-part film encompassing the history of the nation, its people and its societal evolution to the present time. Specific details and the contents of each section, and how to connect them, would evolve further over the ensuing months while Eisenstein, Alexandrov and Tisse shot tens of thousands of feet of film. Toward the latter part of 1931, the film was finally structured, in Eisenstein's mind, to consist of four primary sections plus a brief prologue and epilogue.

The modern film theorist Bordwell also claims that each episode would have its own distinct style, be "dedicated to a different Mexican artist", and would "also base itself on some primal element (stone, water, iron, fire, air)". The soundtrack in each case would feature a different Mexican folk song. Moreover, each episode would tell the story of a romantic couple; and "threading through all parts was the theme of life and death, culminating in the mockery of death". If true, these details were never communicated to the Sinclairs, who found themselves with recurring requests for additional funding as Eisenstein's vision expanded. There appears to have been no attempt by Eisenstein to respect the economic realities involved in making such an epic work, the financial and emotional limitations of his producers, or his contract obligations; this shows his inability or unwillingness to cogently communicate to the Sinclairs before acquiring permission to proceed away from those contract obligations. This was the ultimate legacy of the film, and would be repeated in the similarly aborted Soviet Eisenstein project, Bezhin Meadow.

=== Seton's construction ===
Marie Seton, a friend of Eisenstein, attempted to edit the film under the title Time Under the Sun. She had attempted to rescue the footage and send it to Eisenstein in 1939, but was unable to do so, due to the onset of the Second World War. Her narrative of the film followed the religious life of the Mexican people, from pre-Hispanic times to the Christianization of Mexico. Eisenstein watched this edited version in 1946, and called it "castrated by dirty hands".

=== Alexandrov's construction ===
In Alexandrov and Tobak's 1979 version, which attempts to be as faithful as possible to Eisenstein's original vision, the film unfolds as follows:

Prologue

Set in the time of the Maya civilization in Yucatán.

Sandunga

Life including marriage and motherhood in Tehuantepec. It follows the courtship involving a golden necklace as a dowry, and eventual marriage, of a Concepción and Abundio.

Fiesta

This part depicts the celebration of the Holy Virgin of Guadalupe, and then bullfighting in the Spanish colonial era (played by real-life bullfighter David Liceaga Maciel and his younger brother). There is a brief pause between this episode and the following one.

Maguey

About the pulque industry under the rule of Porfirio Díaz. It follows a tragic romance between peon Sebastian and his fiancée Maria. Maria is held captive and abused by a friend of Sebastian's boss, a hacendado, at which point Sebastian and his fellow workmen devise revenge. They are eventually chased, shot down and those captured are buried in the sand and trampled by riders. Maria breaks free and holds Sebastian's dead body to her. Eisenstein repeatedly told Sinclair that the tale told in this episode would be threaded through the entire six-part picture, while contradictorily describing it as a separate intact episode in other correspondence.

Soldadera

Story of the Mexican Revolution as seen through the experiences of the woman soldiers who followed and fought with their men. No material for this episode was filmed, so it is the shortest and is constructed out of still photographs only.

Epilogue

Showing Mexico at the time of filming, and the celebration of the Day of the Dead. Evidence indicates that Eisenstein secretly planned to compose this segment using satirical shots of fat priests, pompous generalissimos, girl scouts and football players, at least for the version to be shown in the U.S.S.R.

=== Kovalov's construction ===
Film historian Oleg Kovalov released his own construction of the film in 1997, titled Sergei Eisenstein: Mexican Fantasy. Whereas Seton and Alexandrov had consistently cut the shots to mid-length, Kovalov mixed rapid cutting with full unedited shots. Julia Vassileva comments that Kovalov's edit of the film rejects Eisensteinian principles and reflects a style influenced by Andrei Tarkovsky and Alexander Sokurov.

== Legacy ==
Eisenstein is frequently cited as a lasting influence on Mexican cinema. In 1931, as Eisenstein was filming ¡Que viva México!, director Adolfo Fernández Bustamante wrote that Eisenstein was the "pioneer" of representations of Mexico in cinema; he was hailed by the Mexican intelligentsia as the father of future Mexican cinema. With time, however, this perception of Eisenstein changed, and he began to be criticized for his depiction of indigenous peoples: in 1968, the Mexican critic Jorge Ayala Blanco, discussing the film Always Further On (1965), commented that Mexican cinema had begun to free itself of the "unfortunate error of the Eisensteinian legacy". Andrea Noble comments that Que Viva México has become an example in Mexican discourse for how not to depict Mexico, and that Eisenstein and his film have become synonymous with "the clichéd, the stereotypical and the reductive".

== In popular culture ==
Peter Greenaway's film Eisenstein in Guanajuato is an extremely fictionalized version of events during the production of ¡Que viva México! starring Elmer Bäck as Eisenstein.

== Bibliography ==
- Bergan, Ronald (1997), Eisenstein: A Life in Conflict, London: Little, Brown, ISBN 0-316-87708-5.
- Bordwell, David (1993), The Cinema of Eisenstein, Cambridge, MA: Harvard University Press, ISBN 978-0-674-13138-5.
- Eisenstein, Sergei (1972), Que Viva Mexico!, New York: Arno, ISBN 978-0-405-03916-4.
- Geduld, Harry M.; Gottesman, Ronald, eds. (1970), Sergei Eisenstein and Upton Sinclair: The Making & Unmaking of Que Viva Mexico!, Bloomington, IN: Indiana University Press, ISBN 978-0-253-18050-6. Composed of correspondence from the files of Upton Sinclair, including letters, telegrams contracts and other documents to and from Eisenstein, Kimbrough, the Amkino Corp., Stalin and others.
- Karetnikova, Inga (1991), Mexico According to Eisenstein, Albuquerque: University of New Mexico Press, ISBN 0-8263-1257-8. In collaboration with Leon Steinmetz.
- Leyda, Jay (1960), Kino: A History Of The Russian And Soviet Film, New York: Macmillan, OCLC 1683826.
- Leyda, Jay; Voynow, Zina (1982), Eisenstein at Work, New York: Pantheon, ISBN 978-0-394-74812-2
- Noble, Andrea (2006). "Seeing through ¡Que viva México!: Eisenstein's Travels in Mexico". Journal of Iberian and Latin American Studies. 12 (2–3): 173–187. doi:10.1080/14701840601085022.
- Salazkina, Masha (2009), In Excess: Sergei Eisenstein's Mexico, Chicago: University of Chicago Press, ISBN 978-0-226-73414-9.
- Seton, Marie (1952), Sergei M. Eisenstein: A Biography, New York: A.A. Wyn, OCLC 2935257.
- Vassilieva, Julia (2010). "Sergei Eisenstein's ¡Que viva Mexico! through time: Historicizing value judgement". Continuum. 24 (5): 693–705. doi:10.1080/10304312.2010.505336. ISSN 1030-4312. S2CID 143981097.
