= Influences on Francis Bacon =

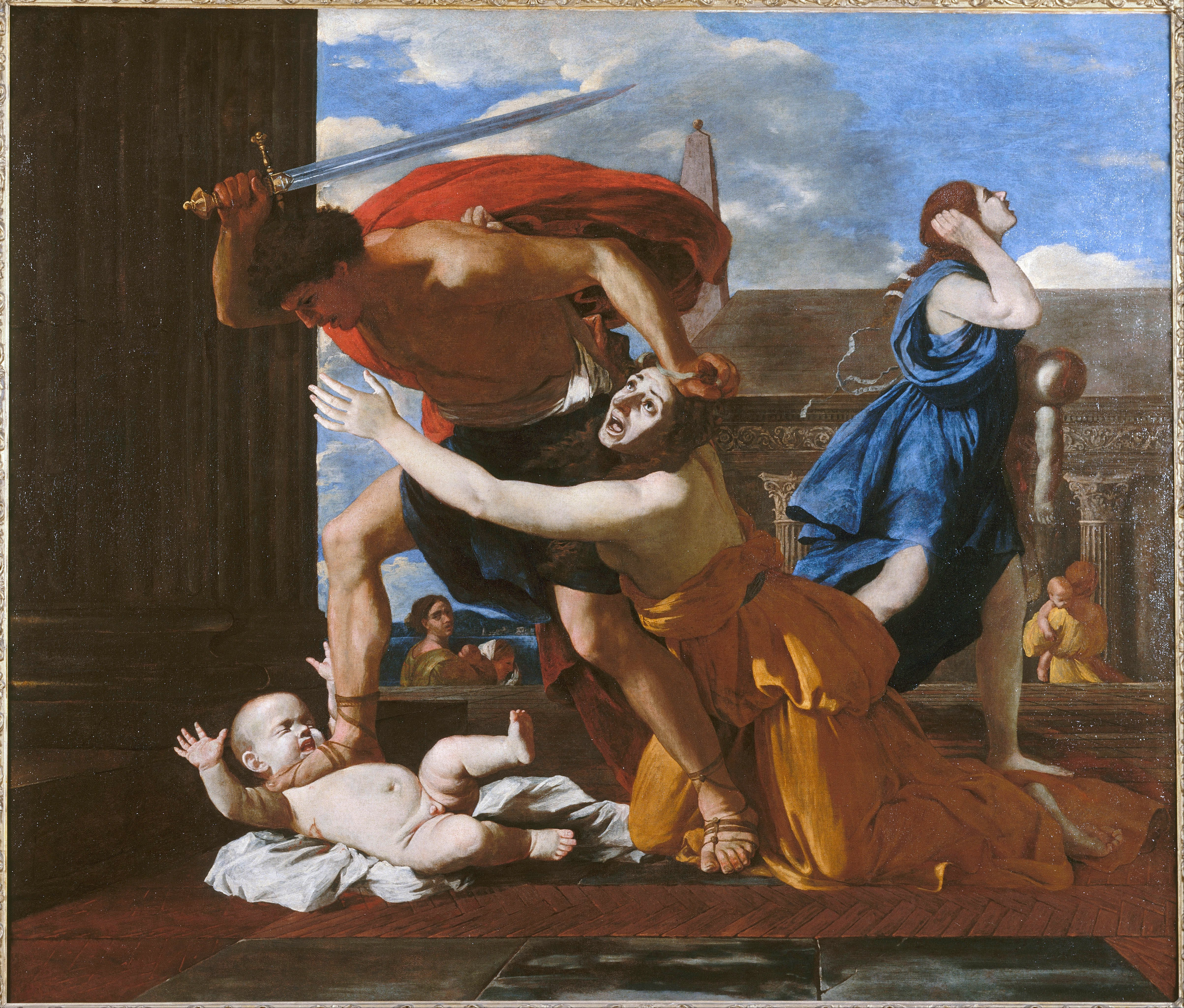
The Massacre of the Innocents, 1625-1632, Nicolas Poussin

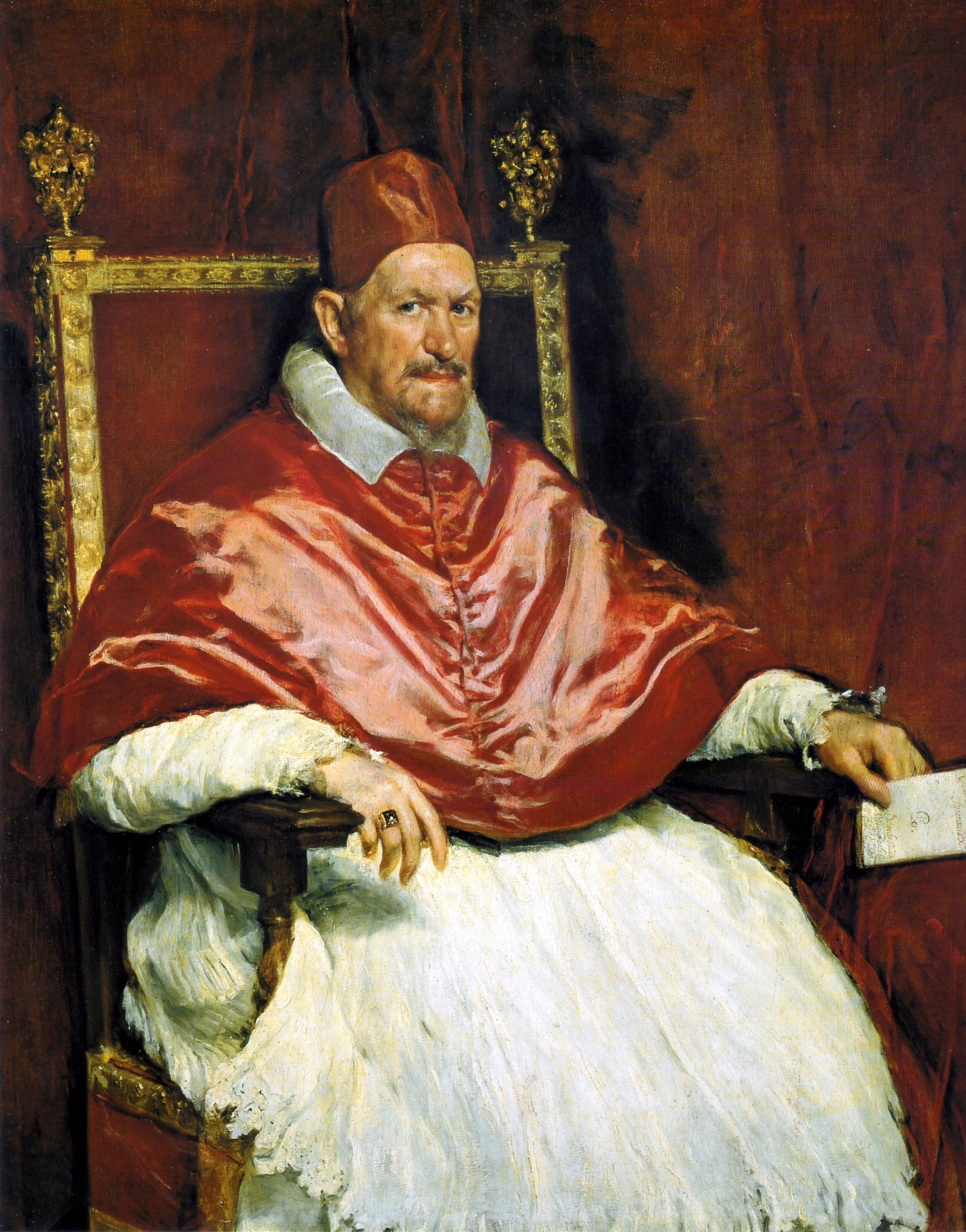
Portrait of Pope Innocent X, 1650, by Diego Velázquez

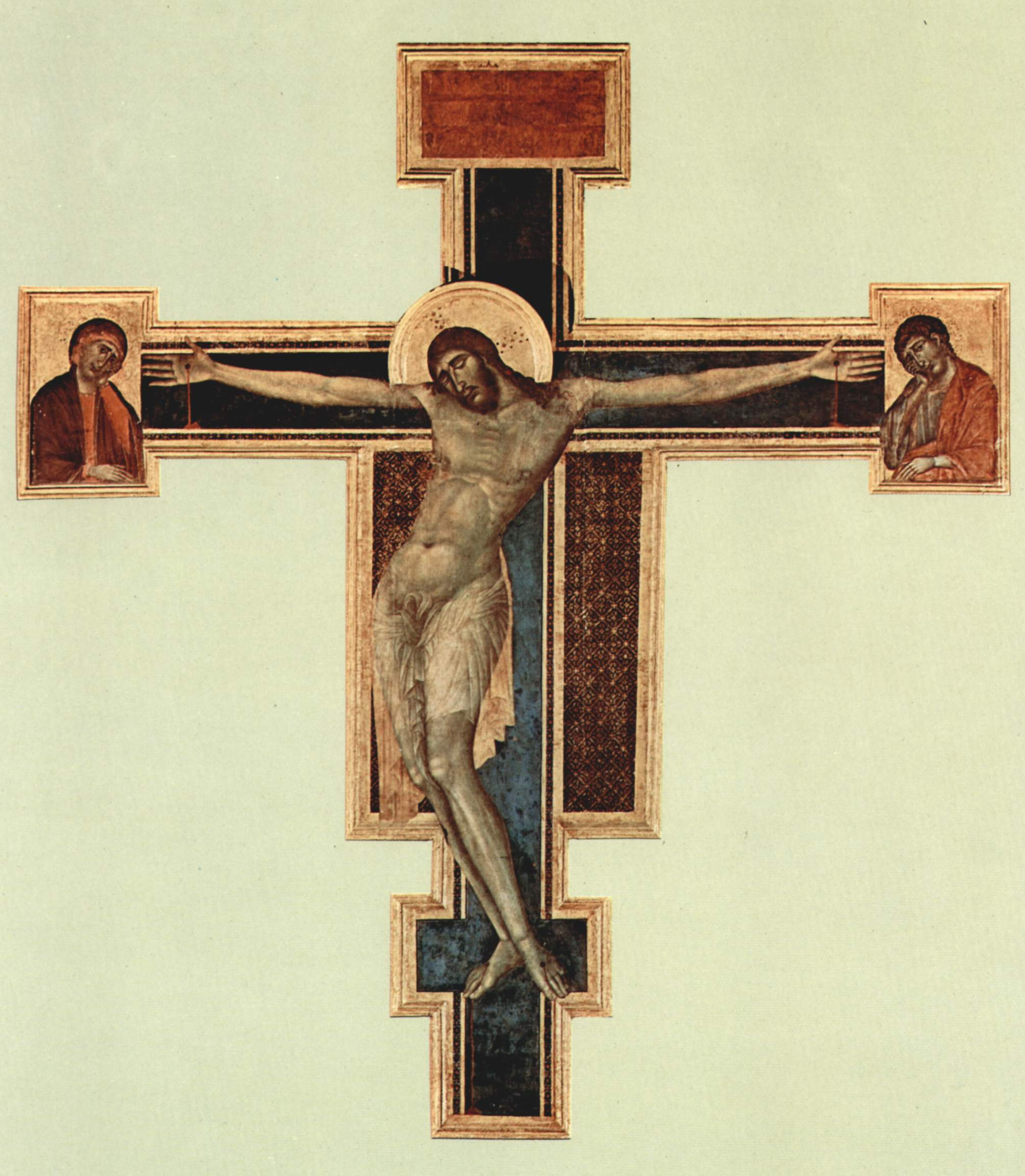
Cimabue's Crucifix (1287–88) was a recurring influence on much of Bacon's mid-1940s and early 1960s work.

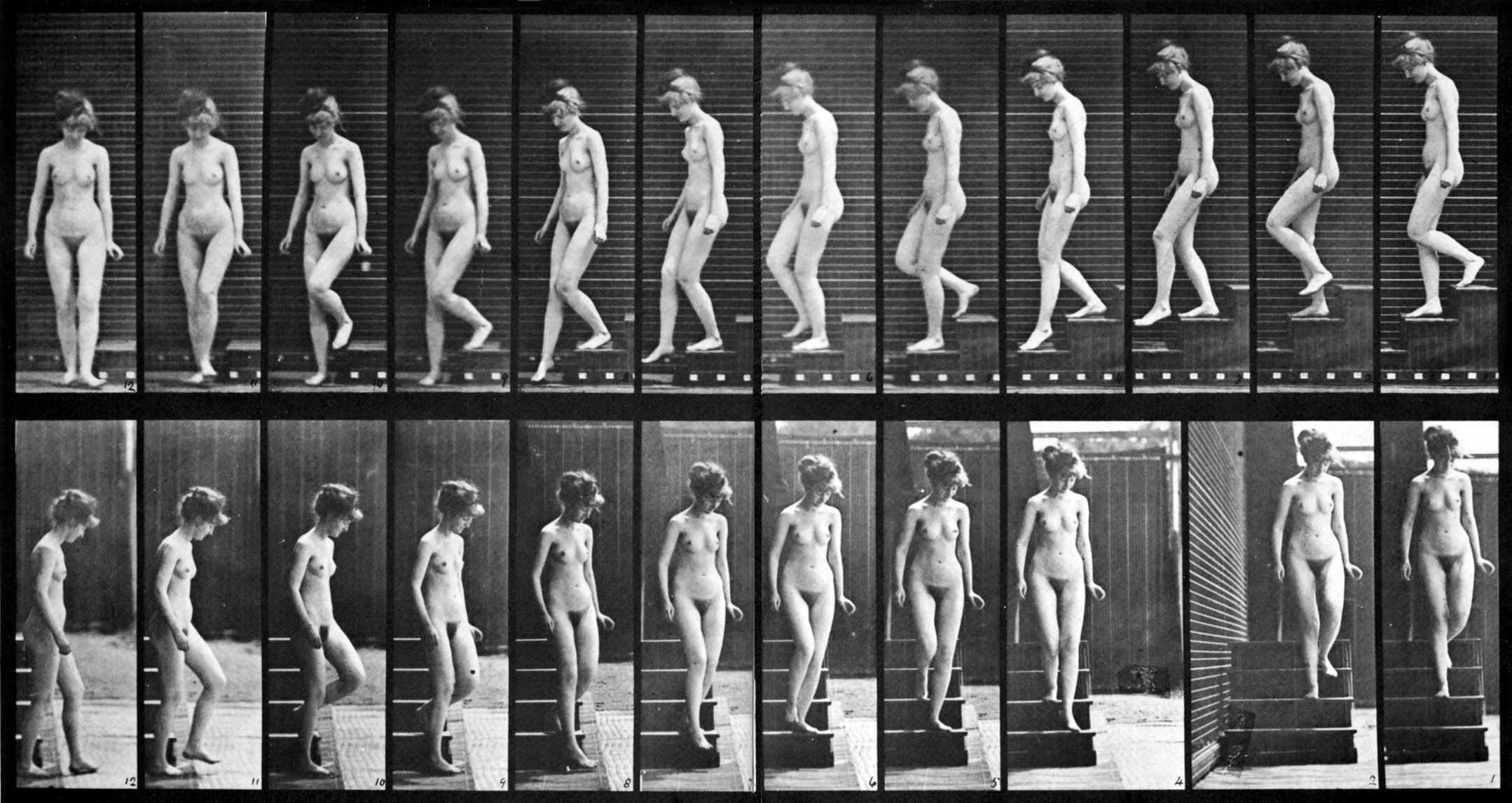
Woman walking downstairs, by Eadweard Muybridge

The painter Francis Bacon was largely self-taught as an artist. As well as other visual artists, Bacon drew inspiration from the poems of T. S. Eliot, Ezra Pound and Yeats, the plays of Aeschylus, Sophocles and Shakespeare; Proust and Joyce's Ulysses.

== Influences ==
- Pablo Picasso, in particular the biomorphic figures in Picasso's paintings of bathers at Dinard of 1927–32.
- Nicolas Poussin's The Massacre of the Innocents of 1628-29. "I think probably the best human cry in painting was made by Poussin [...] which is at Chantilly. And I remember I was once with a family for about three months living very near there, trying to learn French, and I went a great deal to Chantilly and I remember this picture always made a terrific impression on me."
- Diego Velázquez's portrait of Pope Innocent X (1649–50). "that Velázquez is one of the great paintings of the world, of course – well, I was very obsessed with that Velázquez and, of course, I made a great mistake…". Bacon painted several versions, of which Figure with Meat (1954) is an atypically Grand Guignol example. Though he visited Rome, where the painting is on display at the Doria Pamphilj Gallery, Bacon never saw the original Velázquez.
- Vincent van Gogh; Bacon painted several variations of van Gogh's The Painter on the Road to Tarascon in the late 1950s.
- Rembrandt Self-portrait (Musée Granet, Aix-en-Provence)
- Chaïm Soutine Céret period (1919–1923), Carcass of Beef (1926) (Minneapolis)
- John Constable – the full size oil-sketch for The Leaping Horse at the V&A.
- Titian Portrait of Cardinal Filippo Archinto (c.1551–1562)
- Francisco Goya's Black Paintings, although Bacon saw a meanness of spirit in Goya's work that he believed removed him from the front rank of great painters.
- Michelangelo's drawings
- Henri Matisse's Bathers by a River (1909–16)
- Pharonic Egyptian sculpture of the Eighteenth dynasty, from the rule of Amenophis III and Amenophis IV especially.
- Masaccio Trinity c.1424–1428 Santa Maria Novella—Bacon greatly admired Masaccio and similarities between the composition of Trinity and Painting (1946) have been noted by critics.
- Jean Auguste Dominique Ingres Oedipus and the Sphinx (1826–1827), Le Bain Turc (1859–1863)
- Edgar Degas After the Bath, Woman drying herself (1888–1892), Beach Scene (1868–1877)—Both in the collection of the National Gallery, London
- Walter Sickert Granby Street (1912–1913)
- Henri Michaux Untitled (1962)
- Pierre Bonnard
- Georges-Pierre Seurat
- Cimabue "You know the great Cimabue Crucifixion? I always think of that as an image – as a worm crawling down the cross."
- Alberto Giacometti's drawings
- Matthias Grünewald's Isenheim Altarpiece
- Julia Margaret Cameron
- Étienne-Jules Marey
- Eadweard Muybridge "My principal source of visual information is Muybridge, the 19th-century photographer who photographed human and animal movement. His work is unbelievably precise. He created a visual dictionary of movement, a living dictionary."
- Nadar
- John Deakin. Regular at the Colony Room Club and noted photographer who took portraits of Bacons friends on which many of his 1960s paintings were based.
- Luis Buñuel. "I've been very influenced by the films of Buñuel, especially Un chien andalou because I think that Buñuel had a remarkable precision of imagery. I can't say how they have directly affected me but they certainly have affected my whole attitude to visual things – in the acuteness of the visual image which you've got to make."
- Sergei Eisenstein. Strike and The Battleship Potemkin (both 1925). Often reproduced the scream of the nurse from the Odesa Steps scene.
