= Glumov's Diary =

1923 film

- Full movie
- Directed by: S.M. Eisenstein
- Produced by: Aleksandr Khanzhonkov
- Starring: Grigori Aleksandrov; Aleksandr Antonov; Sergei M. Eisenstein
- Release date: 1923
- Running time: 5 minutes
- Country: Soviet Union
- Language: Silent film

Glumov's Diary (Russian: Дневник Глумова, romanized: Dnevnik Glumova) is a 1923 Soviet silent trick film, which was the first film directed by Sergei Eisenstein. It was conceived as a part of the theatre production of Alexander Ostrovsky’s 1868 comedy Enough Stupidity in Every Wise Man (Na vsyakovo mudretsa dovolno prostoty) and it marks Eisenstein's transition from theatre stage director to film director.

== Plot ==
The film is composed of three parts which were screened at different moments of the play.

Eisenstein in Glumov's Diary

The opening sequence starts with a shot of Eisenstein removing his cap and bowing in front of the poster announcing the play, followed by a shot of Grigori Aleksandrov as Glumov, in front of the same poster, and by shots of the main protagonists making comic faces. It has been argued that this could have been screened rather at the end of the play.

The second sequence shows how Glumov's diary was stolen. It was linked to the play by the actor running out of the stage to reappear on screen climbing along the building's facade up to the roof where he was picked by an airplane. Eventually, he jumped out of the airplane to fall into a car that brought him back to the front door of the theater. At the end of this sequence, the actor came back onstage, holding in his hand a film reel.

The third sequence shows metaphorically the contents of Glumov's Diary, using several stop motion substitutions reminiscent of early films by Georges Méliès. It ends up with the wedding of Glumov and Mashenka and Glumov answering requests for money from the other protagonists with a fig sign.

== Production and release ==
Glumov's Diary was a short film produced as a part the theatre production of Alexander Ostrovsky’s 1868 comedy Enough Stupidity in Every Wise Man (Na vsyakovo mudretsa dovolno prostoty) that Eisenstein realised in 1923 for the Proletkult organisation. In the revolutionary context of the Soviet Union established one year before in 1922, the aim of this organisation was to create a new artistic aesthetics suitable for the working class. Eisenstein therefore substantially transformed Ostrovsky's play that he renamed plainly The Wiseman. He transposed the action to contemporary Russian émigrés circles in Paris, with new names for the characters and gave it a parodic style inspired by circus and the Commedia dell'arte.

Following Eisenstein's request at the beginning of 1923 Boris Mikhin, the director of Goskino supplied him with the necessary filmstock and appointed Dziga Vertov as consultant. The film was shot in April 1923 around the Arseny Morozov House in Moscow where the Proletkult theatre productions were taking place, a few days before the première of the play and was screened during the live performance.

The film was eventually included in number 16 of Dziga Vertov's Kino-Pravda (Film Truth) newsreel series, released on 21 May 1923 under the title Spring Smiles of the Proletkult (Vesennie ulybki Proletkulta).

== Restoration ==
Considered lost during many years, Kino-Pravda n° 16, including Glumov's diary, was rediscovered in Krasnogorsk in 1977, restored and included in various DVDs. There are some discussions as to whether the restored version has kept the original order of the different sequences.

== Cast ==
- Grigori Aleksandrov as Glumov/Golutvin
- Aleksandr Antonov as Joffre
- Sergei M. Eisenstein as himself
- Mikhail Gomorov as Turusina
- Vera Muzykant as Mashenka/Mary McLack
- Ivan Pyryev as the Fascist clown
- Maksim Shtraukh as Milyukov-Mamaev
- Vera Yanukova as Mamaeva
