= Abrek Zaur =

1926 film

- Directed by: Boris Mikhin
- Written by: I. Bei-Abai
- Cinematography: Konstantin Kuznetsov
- Edited by: Esfir Shub
- Music by: Vladimir Messman
- Production company: Goskino
- Release date: 1926
- Running time: 85 minutes
- Country: Soviet Union
- Languages: Silent; Russian intertitles

Abrek Zaur (Russian: Абрек Заур) is a 1926 Soviet silent Red Western directed by Boris Mikhin. The film's sets were designed by the art director Isaak Makhlis.

The film is set in 19th-century Russian-occupied Caucasia, where Zaur-bek is outlawed for accidentally killing a Cossack officer, becomes an abrek, and leads a violent rebellion against the empire while seeking vengeance for his fallen friend.

== Plot ==
The story takes place in the Russian Empire during the 19th century. A cavalry officer from Ossetia mistreats a soldier from a Caucasian aul. Zaur, a fellow villager, comes to his defense and accidentally kills the officer during an altercation. As a result, Zaur is branded an abrek—a fugitive outlaw who, according to the authorities, can be killed on sight without consequence.

Zaur takes refuge in the mountains near the village, while the situation becomes more complicated due to a personal vendetta. Prince Kibirov, a Cossack commander, had previously been rejected by Fatima, Zaur's sister, who is promised to Zaur's best friend, Martaza. The villagers, oppressed by the misrule of the Russian Empire, silently support Zaur, while a legal and illegal feud emerges between the abreks and the Cossacks, tasked with maintaining imperial order in the mountainous region.

Zaur's house is burned down, and the village is fined an exorbitant amount. Ibrahim, a merchant whose daughter, Sjuver, is Zaur's fiancée, refuses to offer any financial help, leading the authorities to seize a local farmer's horse, which is essential for agriculture. Zaur, with his outlaw companions and Martaza's help, retrieves the horse and begins a series of provocations against the military, resulting in reprisals. Ibrahim, who had attempted to betray Zaur, is killed, along with the chief of police. Fatima is kidnapped by Kibirov but is later freed. Violence escalates, culminating in gunfights.

The escalating conflict leads to a high-level Cossack command meeting, where the decision is made to burn down the entire village. Zaur, learning of the decision, negotiates with the military and is granted the privilege of being executed by firing squad instead of hanging. However, when he surrenders, the authorities go back on their word, preparing a gallows for him. Zaur's final wish is to dance the lezginka with Martaza. During the dance, the two friends overpower the soldiers and escape, but Martaza is mortally wounded and dies in Zaur's arms, asking him to avenge his death. Zaur storms Kibirov's house and kills him before fleeing into the mountains.

== Cast ==
- Vladimir Bestaev
- Aleksandre Takaishvili
- N. Aganbekova
- N. Gantarina
- Nikoloz Sanishvili
- Vladimir Kriger
- G. Chegelashvili
- D. Kusov
- V. Rogovskaya
- Anya Vasilyeva

== Bibliography ==
- Christie, Ian & Taylor, Richard. The Film Factory: Russian and Soviet Cinema in Documents 1896–1939. Routledge, 2012.
