= Proletcult Theatre =

Theatre branch of the Proletcult Soviet cultural movement

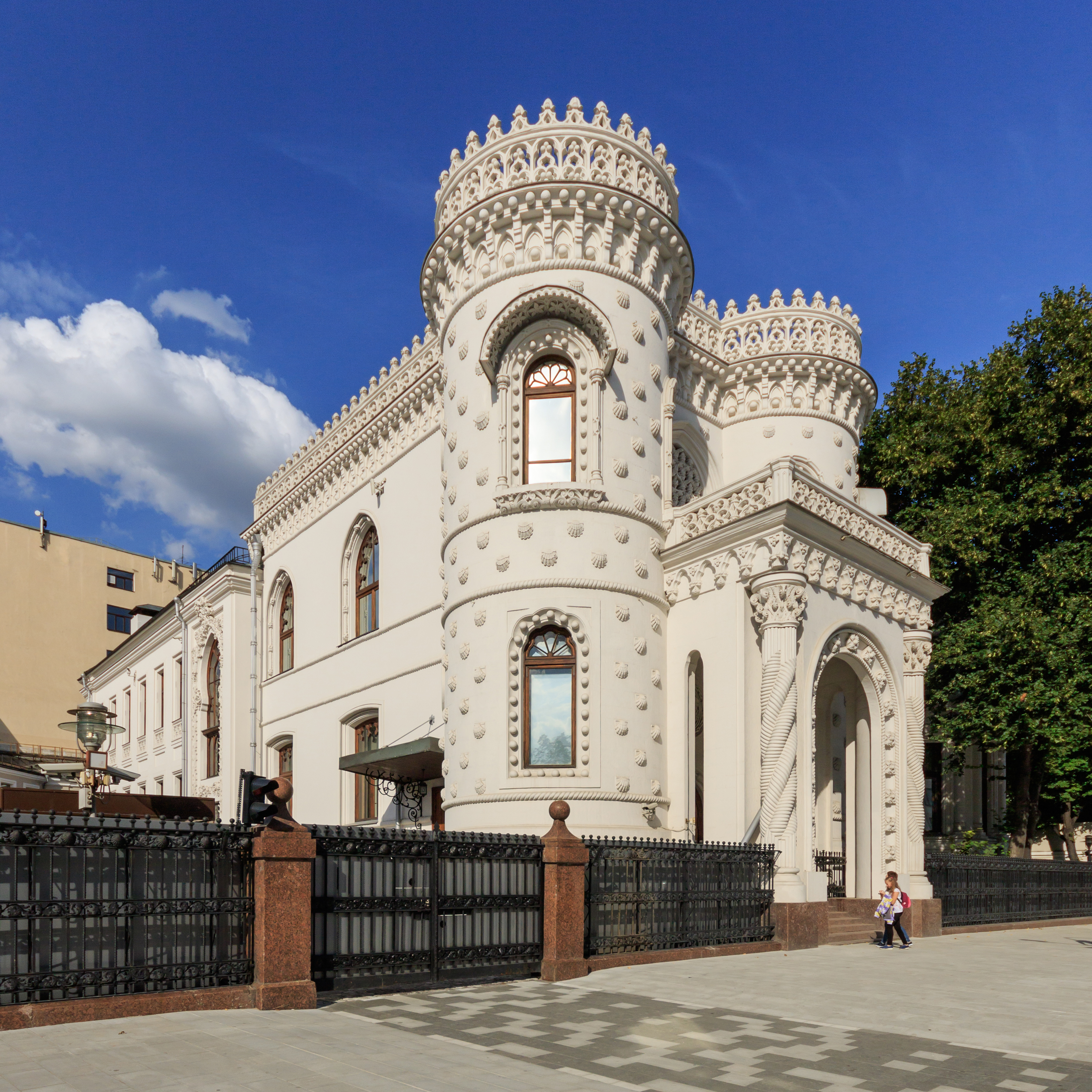
The Arseny Morozov House on Vozdvizhenka Street, home of the Proletcult Theatre in the 1920s.

Proletcult Theatre (Russian: Театры Пролеткульта; abbr. from Proletarian Cultural and Educational Organizations Theatre) was the theatrical branch of the Soviet cultural movement Proletcult. It was concerned with the powerful expression of ideological content as political propaganda in the years following the revolution of 1917. Platon Kerzhentsev was one of its principal practitioners.

It was used as a tool of political agitation that promoted a culture of the factory-floor and industrial motifs, but also folk singing and avant-garde. Plot was unimportant; its goal was to shock the audience with its style of performance, lighting techniques, props, radio broadcasts, blown-up newspaper headlines and slogans, projected films, circus elements, etc.

The Proletcult Theatre attempted to affect the audience psychologically and emotionally, producing a shock in the spectator, the effect of which is to make the viewer aware of the condition of their own lives. This style is often referred to as the theatre of attractions, where an attraction is any aggressive emotional shock that provides the opportunity to raise self-awareness of one's life (to “defamiliarize the familiar”), particularly the mundane material reality.

Prince Serge Wolkonsky taught and gave lectures for Proletcult.

Russian film director Sergei Eisenstein was at one time in charge of the Proletcult Theatre before pursuing his film work. His most significant production for the Proletcult was an adaptation of Aleksandr Ostrovsky's satirical comedy Enough Stupidity in Every Wise Man in April 1923. He continued many of the experimental and ideologically expressive elements of this theatrical form in his films and intellectual montage technique.

Proletcult collapsed at the end of the civil war due to external as well as internal factors, such disputes among leaders and between intellectuals and workers; it lingered on in vestigial form in the 1920s.

== See also ==
- Proletkult

== Sources ==
- Kleberg, Lars. 1980. Theatre as Action: Soviet Russian Avant-Garde Aesthetics. Trans. Charles Rougle. New Directions in Theatre. London: Macmillan, 1993. ISBN 0-333-56817-6.
- Rudnitsky, Konstantin. 1988. Russian and Soviet Theatre: Tradition and the Avant-Garde. Trans. Roxane Permar. Ed. Lesley Milne. London: Thames and Hudson. Rpt. as Russian and Soviet Theater, 1905-1932. New York: Abrams. ISBN 0-500-28195-5.
- Stites, Richard. 1992. Russian Popular Culture: Entertainment and Society since 1900. Cambridge: Cambridge UP. ISBN 0-521-36986-X.
- von Geldern, James. 1993. Bolshevik Festivals, 1917–1920. Berkeley: U of California P. ISBN 0-520-07690-7. Available online here.
