= Enough Stupidity in Every Wise Man =

1868 play by Alexander Ostrovsky

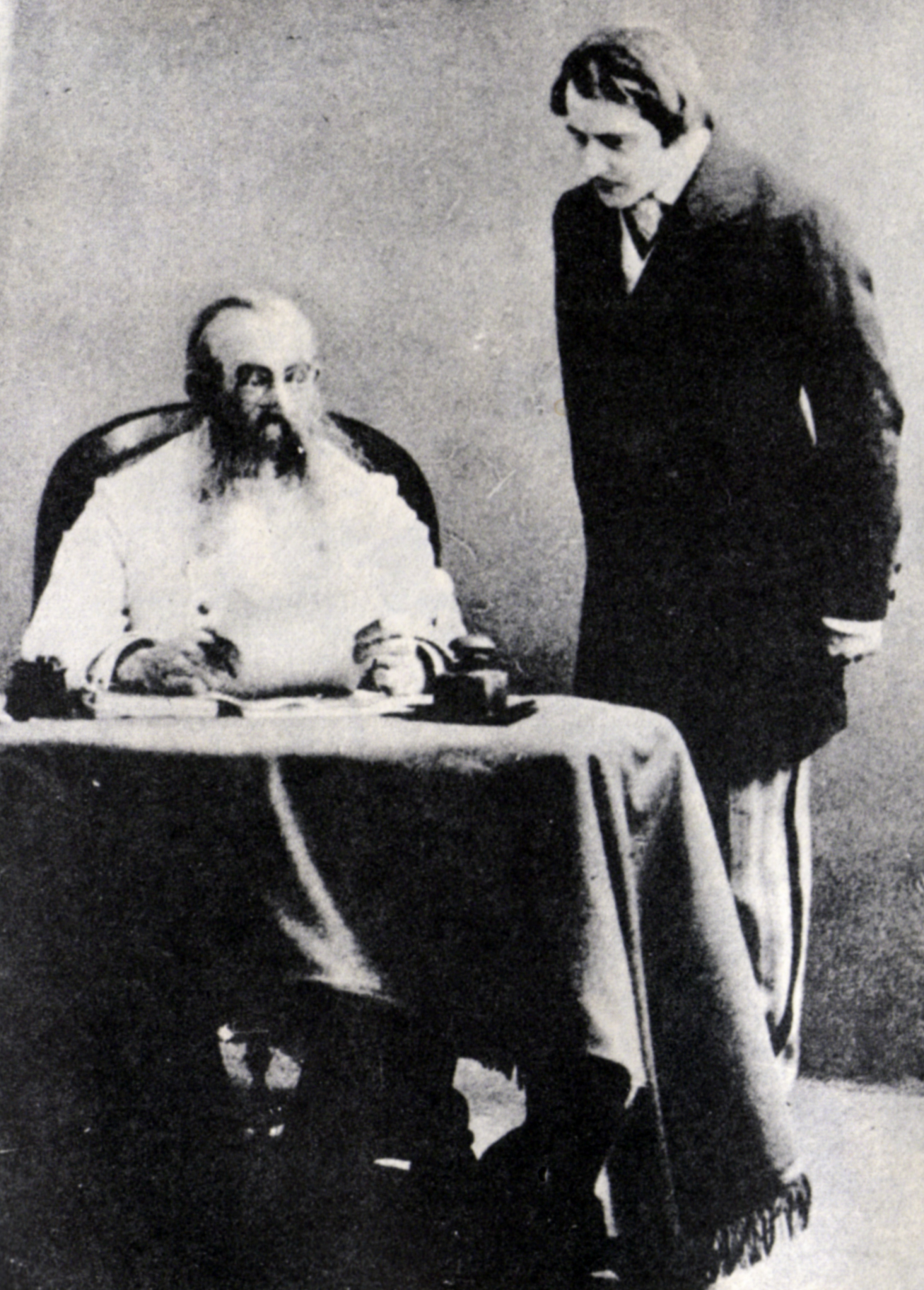
- Stanislavski (left) and Kachalov (right) in the Moscow Art Theatre production in 1910.
- Original language: Russian
- Written by: Aleksandr Ostrovsky
- Genre: Comedy

Premiere
- Date: 13 November [O.S. 1 November] 1868

Enough Stupidity in Every Wise Man (Russian: На всякого мудреца довольно простоты; translit. Na vsyakogo mudretsa dovolno prostoty), sometimes published in English under the title Too Clever By Half, is a five-act comedy by Aleksandr Ostrovsky. The play offers a satirical treatment of bigotry and charts the rise of a double-dealer who manipulates other people's vanities. It is Ostrovsky's best-known comedy in the West.

== Production history ==
1868 – Alexandrinsky Theatre, Saint Petersburg.

1868 – Maly Theatre, Moscow.

1885 – Korsh Theatre, Moscow.

Russian theatre director Konstantin Stanislavsky directed the play with his Moscow Art Theatre. The production opened on 23 March [O.S. 11 March] 1910. Stanislavski played General Krutitsky and Kachalov played Glumov.

A production of the play was the most significant of the early theatre work of the Russian Soviet film director Sergei Eisenstein. The playwright Sergei Tretyakov transformed Ostrovsky's text into a revue (what Eisenstein called a "montage of attractions"), which was entitled Wiseman (Mudrets). Eisenstein and Tretyakov's approach was part of the Russian avant-garde Futurist movement known as "Eccentricism," which sought the "circusisation" of the theatre. In celebration of the centennial of Ostrovsky's birth, the production opened in April 1923. It was staged by the First Workers' Theatre of the Prolekult in its theatre in the Arseny Morozov House, an ornate mansion on Vozdvizhenka Street, with a cast that included Maxim Shtraukh, Ivan Pyryev, and Grigori Aleksandrov. Eisenstein drew on popular theatre techniques such as farce and the commedia dell'arte in his staging, which sought to make every metaphor concrete and physical; he wrote:

A gesture turns into gymnastics, rage is expressed through a somersault, exaltation through a salto-mortale, lyricism by a run along a tightrope. The grotesque of this style permitted leaps from one type of expression to another, as well as unexpected intertwinings of the two expressions.

A screening of Eisenstein's first film, entitled Glumov's Diary, concluded the performance. Writing in 1928, Eisenstein explained that he had aimed "to achieve a revolutionary modernization of Ostrovsky, i.e., a social re-evaluation of his characters, seeing them as they might appear today."

Boris Nirenburg and A. Remizova directed an adaptation of the play for television in 1971.

== Sources ==
- Banham, Martin, ed. 1998. The Cambridge Guide to Theatre. Cambridge: Cambridge UP. ISBN 0-521-43437-8.
- Benedetti, Jean. 1999. Stanislavski: His Life and Art. Revised edition. Original edition published in 1988. London: Methuen. ISBN 0-413-52520-1.
- Brockett, Oscar G. and Franklin J. Hildy. 2003. History of the Theatre. Ninth edition, International edition. Boston: Allyn and Bacon. ISBN 0-205-41050-2.
- Gerould, Daniel. 1974. "Eisenstein's Wiseman." The Drama Review 18.1 (March): 71–85.
- Kleberg, Lars. 1980. Theatre as Action: Soviet Russian Avant-Garde Aesthetics. Trans. Charles Rougle. New Directions in Theatre. London: Macmillan, 1993. ISBN 0-333-56817-6.
- Kolocotroni, Vassiliki, Jane Goldman, and Olga Taxidou, eds. 1998. Modernism: An Anthology of Sources and Documents. Edinburgh: Edinburgh University Press. ISBN 0-7486-0973-3.
- Leach, Robert, and Victor Borovsky, eds. 1999. A History of Russian Theatre. Cambridge: Cambridge UP. ISBN 0-521-43220-0.
- Magarshack, David. 1950. Stanislavsky: A Life. London and Boston: Faber, 1986. ISBN 0-571-13791-1.
- Rudnitsky, Konstantin. 1988. Russian and Soviet Theatre: Tradition and the Avant-Garde. Trans. Roxane Permar. Ed. Lesley Milne. London: Thames and Hudson. Rpt. as Russian and Soviet Theater, 1905–1932. New York: Abrams. ISBN 0-500-28195-5.
- Sealey Rahman, Kate. 1999. "Aleksandr Ostrovsky – Dramatist and Director." In Leach and Borovsky (1999, 166–181).
