= Mikhail Gomorov =

Soviet actor (1898–1981)

- Born: Mikhail Gomorov; 27 December 1898
- Died: 20 November 1981 (aged 82)
- Occupations: Actor, film director
- Years active: 1923–1932

Mikhail Gomorov (Russian: Михаил Гоморов; 27 December 1898 – 20 November 1981) was a Soviet actor and film director, most well known for his role in Battleship Potemkin as a militant sailor.

== Selected filmography ==
- 1923 — Glumov's Diary
- 1925 — Strike
- 1925 — Battleship Potemkin
- 1929 — The General Line
