= Incident in the Taiga =

1953 film by Yuri Yegorov

- Directed by: Yuri Yegorov
- Release date: 1953
- Country: Soviet Union
- Language: Russian

Incident in the Taiga (Russian: Случай в тайге) is a 1953 Soviet action film directed by Yuri Yegorov and starring Aleksandr Antonov and Gombozhap Tsydynzhapov.

== Plot ==
A young zoologist, Andrei Sazonov (played by Boris Bityukov), arrives from Moscow to a Siberian hunting enterprise to implement his newly developed method for breeding sable. While there, Andrei accuses Fyodor Volkov (played by Alexander Antonov), the enterprise's best hunter, of poaching. As a result, Volkov leaves the hunting operation, leaving Sazonov in a difficult position.

== Cast ==
- Rimma Shorokhova as Yelena Sedykh (as R. Shorokhova)
- Boris Bityukov as Andrey Sazonov (as B. Bityukov)
- Aleksandr Antonov as Fyodor Volkov (as A. Antonov)
- Anatoliy Kubatsky as Nikita Stepanych (as A. Kubatskiy)
- Gombozhap Tsydynzhapov as Bogduyev (as G. Tsydynzhapov)
- Muza Krepkogorskaya as Katya Volkova (as M. Krepkogorskaya)
- Ivan Kuznetsov as Dolgushin (as I. Kuznetsov)
- Tsyren Shagzhin as Uladay (as Ts. Shagzin)
- Pyotr Lyubeshkin as Yegor Ivanovich (as P. Lyubeshkin)
- Vladimir Gulyaev as Yasha

== Bibliography ==
- Rollberg, Peter. Historical Dictionary of Russian and Soviet Cinema. Scarecrow Press, 2008.
