= Marie Seton =

British actress and critic (1910–1985)

- Born: 20 March 1910
- Died: 17 February 1985 (aged 74)
- Occupations: Actress, art, theatre and film critic and biographer
- Spouse: Donald Hesson (m. 1938–1942)

Marie Seton (20 March 1910 – 17 February 1985) was a British actress, art, theatre and film critic and biographer of Sergei Eisenstein, Paul Robeson, Jawaharlal Nehru, and Satyajit Ray.

== Biography ==
Her father, Captain Seton served in the British Army in India and South Africa. After the death of Captain Seton, Marie's mother, also named Marie, remarried Sir Charles Walpole.

In 1935, Seton helped to establish the reputation of Jamaican sculptor Ronald Moody.

In 1936, she helped her friend C. L. R. James, the Trinidadian writer and radical political activist, to put on his play about the Haitian Revolution, Toussaint Louverture: The Story of the Only Successful Slave Revolt in History, which starred Paul Robeson in the title role, with the Stage Society.

Seton's reconstruction of Sergei Eisenstein’s projected epic, ¡Que viva México!, as a film released in 1939 entitled Time in the Sun, is considered by many critics as probably nearest to Eisenstein's concept because of her close relationship with the filmmaker.

She was a regular contributor to Sight and Sound and other publications.

In the late 1930s, she became part of the circle of P. D. Ouspensky and later worked for him after his move to New York City.

Between 1938 and 1942, she was married to Donald Hesson, a Chicago lawyer and author.

According to her friend, Pamela Cullen, Seton "had a fascination for India and as a young woman she had been introduced to India's fight for independence by one of India's greatest political figures, Krishna Menon, who was then a struggling lawyer in London. She also had family associations with India through her father, who had served as an officer in the Indian Army and been seriously wounded during one of the many uprisings of the period".

Nehru invited Seton to India to help with the University Film Society and the Children's Film Society. She was probably recommended to him by D. G. Tendulkar, who must have known her during the time he was in Moscow studying cinema with Sergei Eisenstein. Over the years, Seton became a friend of Indira Gandhi. For some time in the 1960s, Seton was a house guest of the Nehrus and stayed in Teen Murti.

Seton lived in India in the 1960s and 1970s, and was actively involved in the film society movement, at the same time as being a close observer of Indian politics. She worked closely with Vijaya Mulay and Chidananda Dasgupta in establishing the Federation of Film Societies of India.

On her death, at her own request Seton was cremated, and the plaque of her ashes in Golders Green Crematorium reads: "Marie Seton Hesson, Padma Bhushan, Citizen of the World".

== Awards ==
In recognition of her work, the Indian government honored Seton with the Padma Bhusan civilian award in 1984.

== Publications ==
Books

- Seton, Marie (1952). Sergei M. Eisenstein: a biography. London: The Bodley Head.
- — (1956). The Film as an Educational Force in India. India: Ministry of Education.
- — (1958). Paul Robeson. London: Dennis Dobson.
- — (1961). Film Appreciation: The Art of Five Directors. New Delhi: NCERT.
- — (1967). Panditji: A Portrait of Jawaharlal Nehru. London: Dennis Dobson.
- — (1971). Portrait of a Director: Satyajit Ray. London: Dennis Dobson. New Delhi: Vikas Publications. Revised edition, with foreword by Sandip Ray, Penguin Books India, 2003.
- — (1981). Song of the Atom. London: Dennis Dobson.

Articles

- "A Conversation with V. I. Pudovkin", in Sight and Sound (London), Spring 1933.
- "Eisenstein's Images and Mexican Art", in Sight and Sound (London), July–September 1953.
- "Journey Through India", in Sight and Sound (London), Spring 1957.

== Sources ==
- Marie Seton at IMDb
- Marie Seton, a wiki is a collaborative space for people who are interested in the life and work of Marie Seton. Some of them personally knew and worked with her and one of them is working on a biography of her.
- "In Excess: Sergei Eisenstein's Mexico": review of Que Viva Mexico by Isabel Arredondo in The Americas, 66.4 (2010): 583–585. Project MUSE. Web. 24 April 2011.
- Crowther, Bosley (1 October 1940). "Time In The Sun (1940)". New York Times Review.
- Datta, Partho (7 September 2003). "A Classic Resurrected". The Hindu. Archived from the original on 8 October 2003. review by Partho Datta of new edition of Marie Seton's biography of Satyajit Ray.
