= Boris Mikhin =

Boris Mikhin (Russian: Михин, Борис Александрович, romanized: Mikhin, Boris Aleksandrovich (1881–April 11, 1963) was a Russian and Soviet film director, screenwriter, artist, film producer, one of the founders of the Mosfilm film studio.

In 1909 he graduated from Kharkov University. After various odd jobs he joins the film studio of Aleksandr Khanzhonkov.

In 1926 he was arrested on the accusation of wrecking (sabotage) in film industry, acquitted, in 1934 arrested again and spend several months in confinement. After that he left film industry.

== Filmography ==
- 1923: On Wings Skyward, director, screenriter; biopic
  The first film of Mosfilm
- Strike (1925 film), producer
- 1926: Abrek Zaur, director; black and whine silent biographical film about engineer Vasily Glagovev and his son Boris Glagolev, aviator
- 1929, Князь Церен (Безродный. Мудрешкин сын), director; black and white silent feature film based on the novel Мудрешкин сын by Kalmyk author Anton Amuur-Sanan
- 1930 Two Keys (film), director, scriptwriter
  Shot at the Vostokkino ("Eastfilm") film studio
