= Harry M. Geduld =

British American film historian (1931–2016)

Harry Maurice Geduld (3 March 1931, in London – 21 January 2016, in Morgantown, Indiana) was a British American film and entertainment historian, best remembered for his books Authors on Film (1972), The Birth of the Talkies: From Edison to Jolson (1975), The Definitive Dr. Jekyll and Mr. Hyde Companion (1983), and Chapliniana: A Commentary on Charlie Chaplin's 81 Movies (1987), among others. He was professor emeritus of film studies at Indiana University. A graduate of University of Sheffield and University of London, he was Fulbright scholar, and most notably a professor of Bruce Joel Rubin.
