= Russian battleship Sevastopol (1911) =

Russian Gangut-class battleship

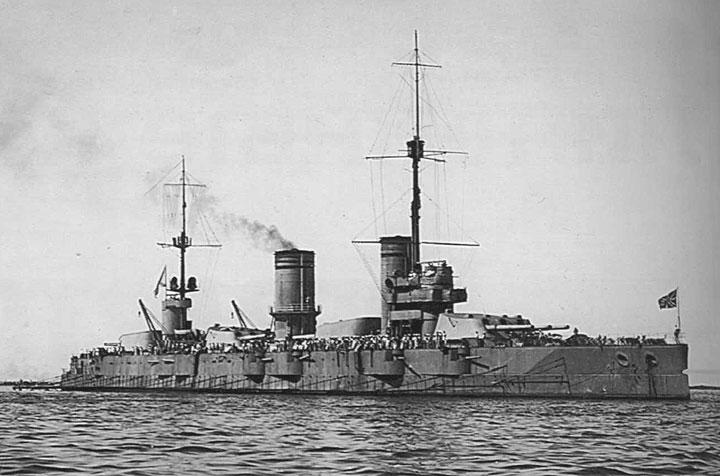
- Sevastopol during World War I

History

Russian Empire
- Name: Sevastopol
- Namesake: Siege of Sevastopol
- Builder: Baltic Works, Saint Petersburg
- Laid down: 16 June 1909 (Note: All dates used in this article are New Style)
- Launched: 10 July 1911
- Commissioned: 30 November 1914

Soviet Union
- Name: Parizhskaya Kommuna
- Namesake: Paris Commune
- Acquired: November 1917
- Recommissioned: 17 September 1925
- Decommissioned: November 1918
- Renamed: Parizhskaya Kommuna 21 March 1921; Sevastopol 31 May 1943
- Stricken: 17 February 1956
- Nickname(s): Parizhanka (Parisienne)
- Honours and awards: Order of the Red Banner 8 July 1945
- Fate: Scrapped in 1957

General characteristics
- Class & type: Gangut-class battleship
- Displacement: 24,800 t (24,400 long tons; 27,300 short tons)
- Length: 181.2 m (594 ft 6 in)
- Beam: 26.9 m (88 ft 3 in)
- Draft: 8.99 m (29 ft 6 in)
- Installed power: 52,000 shp (38,776 kW) (on trials)
- Propulsion: 4-shaft Parsons steam turbines; 25 Yarrow boilers
- Speed: 24.1 knots (44.6 km/h; 27.7 mph) (on trials)
- Range: 3,200 nmi (5,900 km; 3,700 mi) at 10 knots (19 km/h; 12 mph)
- Complement: 1,149
- Armament: 4 × triple 12 in (305 mm) guns; 16 × single 4.7 in (120 mm) guns; 1 × single 3 in (76 mm) AA gun; 4 × 17.7 in (450 mm) torpedo tubes; After 1941 refit: 4 × 12-inch (305 mm)/52 guns; 12 × 1 – 4.7-inch (120 mm) guns; 3 × 1 – 3-inch (76 mm) AA guns; 16 × 1 – 1.5-inch (37 mm) AA gun; 12 × 1 – 0.50-inch (12.7 mm) DShKM AA machine guns
- Armor: Waterline belt: 125–225 mm (4.9–8.9 in); Deck: 12–50 mm (0.47–1.97 in); Turrets: 76–203 mm (3.0–8.0 in); Barbettes: 75–150 mm (3.0–5.9 in); Conning tower: 100–254 mm (3.9–10.0 in)

Sevastopol (Russian: Севастополь) was the first ship completed of the Gangut-class battleships of the Imperial Russian Navy, built before World War I. The Ganguts were the first class of Russian dreadnoughts. She was named after the Siege of Sevastopol during the Crimean War. She was completed during the winter of 1914–1915, but was not ready for combat until mid-1915. Her role was to defend the mouth of the Gulf of Finland against the Germans, who never tried to enter, so she spent her time training and providing cover for minelaying operations. Her crew joined the general mutiny of the Baltic Fleet after the February Revolution and joined the Bolsheviks later that year. She was laid up in 1918 for lack of manpower, but her crew joined the Kronstadt rebellion of 1921. She was renamed Parizhskaya Kommuna (Russian: Парижская коммуна) after the rebellion was crushed to commemorate the Paris Commune and to erase the ship's betrayal of the Communist Party.

She was recommissioned in 1925, and refitted in 1928 in preparation for her transfer to the Black Sea the following year. Parizhskaya Kommuna and the cruiser Profintern ran into a severe storm in the Bay of Biscay that severely damaged Parizhskaya Kommuna's false bow. They had to put into Brest for repairs, but reached Sevastopol in January 1930. Parizhskaya Kommuna was comprehensively reconstructed in two stages during the 1930s that replaced her boilers, upgraded her guns, augmented her anti-aircraft armament, modernized her fire-control systems and gave her anti-torpedo bulges. During World War II she provided gunfire support during the Siege of Sevastopol and related operations until she was withdrawn from combat in April 1942 when the risk from German aerial attack became too great. She was retained on active duty after the war until she became a training ship in 1954. She was broken up in 1956–1957.

== Design and description ==
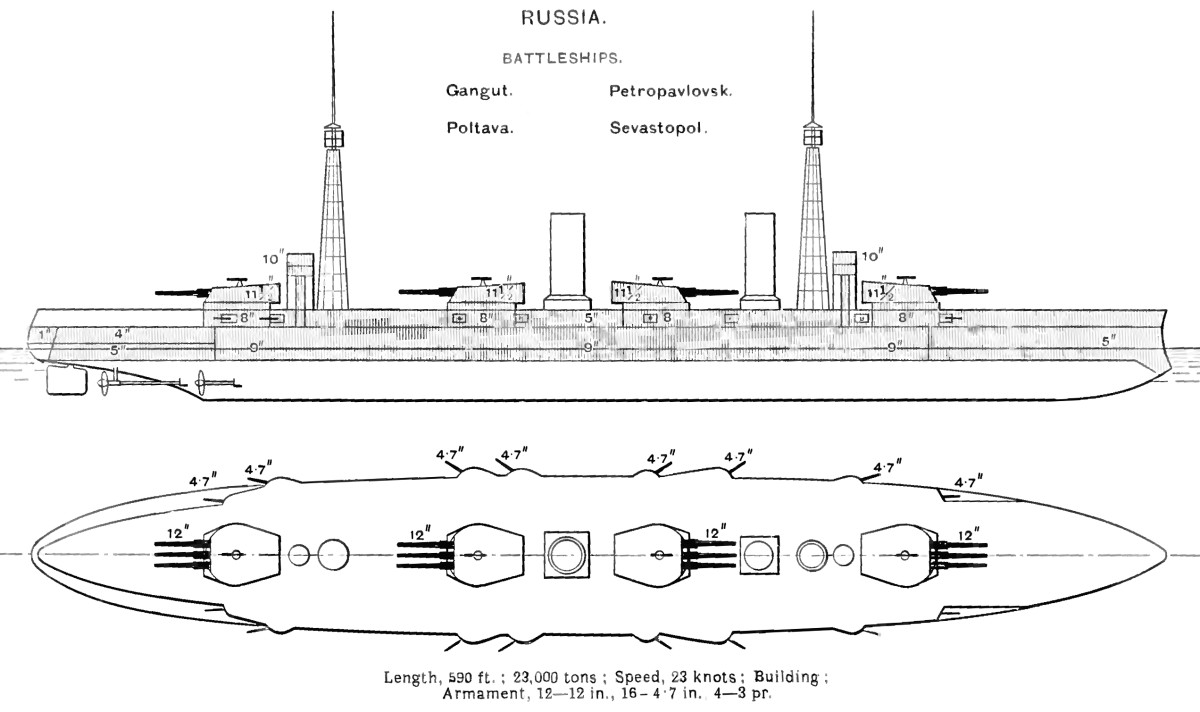
Plan view of the Gangut class

Sevastopol was 180 meters (590 ft 7 in) long at the waterline and 181.2 meters (594 ft 6 in) long overall. She had a beam of 26.9 meters (88 ft 3 in) and a draft of 8.99 meters (29 ft 6 in), 49 centimeters (1 ft 7 in) more than designed. Her displacement was 24,800 tonnes (24,400 long tons) at load, over 1,500 t (1,500 long tons; 1,700 short tons) more than her designed displacement of 23,288 t (22,920 long tons).

Sevastopol's machinery was built by the Baltic Works. Ten Parsons-type steam turbines drove the four propellers. The engine rooms were located between turrets three and four in three transverse compartments. The outer compartments each had a high-pressure ahead and reverse turbine for each wing propeller shaft. The central engine room had two each low-pressure ahead and astern turbines as well as two cruising turbines driving the two center shafts. The engines had a total designed output of 42,000 shaft horsepower (31,319 kW), but they produced 52,000 shp (38,776 kW) during her sister Poltava's full-speed trials on 21 November 1915 and gave a top speed of 24.1 knots (44.6 km/h; 27.7 mph). Twenty-five Yarrow boilers provided steam to the engines at a designed working pressure of 17.5 standard atmospheres (1,770 kPa; 257 psi). Each boiler was fitted with Thornycroft oil sprayers for mixed oil/coal burning. They were arranged in two groups. The forward group consisted of two boiler rooms in front of the second turret, the foremost of which had three boilers while the second one had six. The rear group was between the second and third turrets and comprised two compartments, each with eight boilers. At full load she carried 1,847.5 long tons (1,877.1 t) of coal and 700 long tons (710 t) of fuel oil and that provided her a range of 3,500 nautical miles (6,500 km; 4,000 mi) at a speed of 10 knots (19 km/h; 12 mph).

The main armament of the Ganguts consisted of a dozen 52-caliber Obukhovskii 12-inch (305 mm) Pattern 1907 guns mounted in four triple turrets distributed the length of the ship. The Russians did not believe that superfiring turrets offered any advantage, discounting the value of axial fire and believing that superfiring turrets could not fire while over the lower turret because of muzzle blast problems. They also believed that distributing the turrets, and their associated magazines, over the length of the ship improved the survivability of the ship. Sixteen 50-caliber 4.7-inch (119 mm) Pattern 1905 guns were mounted in casemates as the secondary battery intended to defend the ship against torpedo boats. The ships were completed with only a single 30-caliber 3-inch (76 mm) Lender anti-aircraft (AA) gun mounted on the quarterdeck. Other AA guns were probably added during the course of World War I, but details are lacking. Budzbon says that four 75-millimeter (3.0 in) were added to the roofs of the end turrets during the war. Four 17.7-inch (450 mm) submerged torpedo tubes were mounted with three torpedoes for each tube.

== Service ==
Sevastopol was built by the Baltic Works in Saint Petersburg. Her keel was laid down on 16 June 1909 and she was launched on 10 July 1911. She was commissioned on 30 November 1914 and reached Helsingfors late the next month where she was assigned to the First Battleship Brigade of the Baltic Fleet. Sevastopol and her sister Gangut provided distant cover for minelaying operations south of Liepāja on 27 August, the furthest that any Russian dreadnought ventured out of the Gulf of Finland during World War I. She ran aground on 10 September and was under repair for two months. On 17 October a half-charge of powder was dropped and ignited when it impacted the floor of the forward magazine. Flooding the magazine prevented an explosion, but the fire killed two men and burned a number of others. She saw no action of any kind during 1916, but hit underwater rocks twice that year, suffering minor damage each time. Her crew joined the general mutiny of the Baltic Fleet on 16 March 1917, after the idle sailors received word of the February Revolution in Saint Petersburg. The Treaty of Brest-Litovsk required the Soviets to evacuate their base at Helsinki in March 1918 or have them interned by newly independent Finland, even though the Gulf of Finland was still frozen over. Sevastopol and her sisters led the first group of ships out on 12 March and reached Kronstadt five days later in what became known as the 'Ice Voyage'.

The crew of the Sevastopol joined the Kronstadt rebellion of March 1921. She returned fire when the Bolsheviks began to bombard Kronstadt Island and was hit by three 12-inch shells that killed or wounded 102 sailors. After the rebellion was bloodily crushed, she was renamed Parizhskaya Kommuna after the Paris Commune on 31 March 1921. She was refitted several times before she was recommissioned on 17 September 1925. She was refitted again in 1928 at the Baltic Shipyard, in preparation for her transfer to the Black Sea Fleet. Her forward funnel was raised and the upper part was angled aft in an attempt to keep the exhaust gases out of the control and gunnery spaces, while three 3-inch 'Lender' AA guns were added to the roofs of the fore and aft turrets. She received some additional rangefinders and she was given a false bow to improve her sea-keeping ability. She sailed for the Black Sea on 22 November 1929, in company of the cruiser Profintern, encountering a bad storm in the Bay of Biscay. The open-topped bow lacked enough drainage and tended to trap a lot of water which badly damaged both the false bow and the supporting structure. Parizhskaya Kommuna was forced to put into Brest for repairs, which included the removal of the bulwark that retained so much water. Both ships arrived at Sevastopol on 18 January 1930 and Parizhskaya Kommuna became the flagship of the Black Sea Fleet.

=== Reconstruction ===
She temporarily mounted an imported Heinkel aircraft catapult atop the third turret between 1930 and 1933. It was transferred to the cruiser Krasnyi Kavkaz when the battleship began the first stage of her reconstruction in November 1933. This was based on that done for her sister Oktyabrskaya Revolyutsiya, but was even more extensive. Her rear superstructure was enlarged and a new structure was built just forward of it which required the repositioning of the mainmast forward. This did not leave enough room for a derrick, as was fitted in Marat, and two large booms were fitted to handle aircraft while the existing boat cranes remained in place. The mast had to be reinforced by two short legs to handle the weight of the booms and their loads. Her false bow was reworked into a real forecastle like those fitted to her sisters. All twenty-five of her old boilers were replaced by a dozen oil-fired boilers originally intended for the Borodino-class battlecruisers. The space saved was used to add another inboard longitudinal watertight bulkhead that greatly improved her underwater protection.

Her turrets were modified to use a fixed loading angle of 6° and fitted with more powerful elevating motors which increased their rate of fire to two rounds per minute. Their maximum elevation was increased to 40° which extended their range to 32,320 yards (29,550 m) and they were redesignated as MK-3-12 Mod. She landed her old 'Lender' AA guns and replaced them with six semi-automatic 45-millimeter (1.8 in) 21-K AA guns, three atop the fore and aft turrets. Three 76.2-millimeter (3.00 in) 34-K each were mounted on platforms on the fore and aft superstructures as well as a total of twelve 12.7-millimeter (0.50 in) DShKM machine guns. Her fire-control system was completely revised with a pair of KDP-6 fire control director, equipped with two 6-meter (20 ft) Zeiss rangefinders positioned atop both superstructures. Her original Pollen Argo Clock mechanical fire-control computer was replaced with a copy of a Vickers Ltd fire-control computer, designated AKUR by the Soviets, as well as a copy of a Sperry stable vertical gyroscope. She also received the first stabilized anti-aircraft directors in the Soviet fleet, SVP-1s that were fitted on each side of the forward superstructure. They were manually stabilized and less than satisfactory as the men manning them had difficulties keeping their sights on the horizon while the ship's motions were violent.

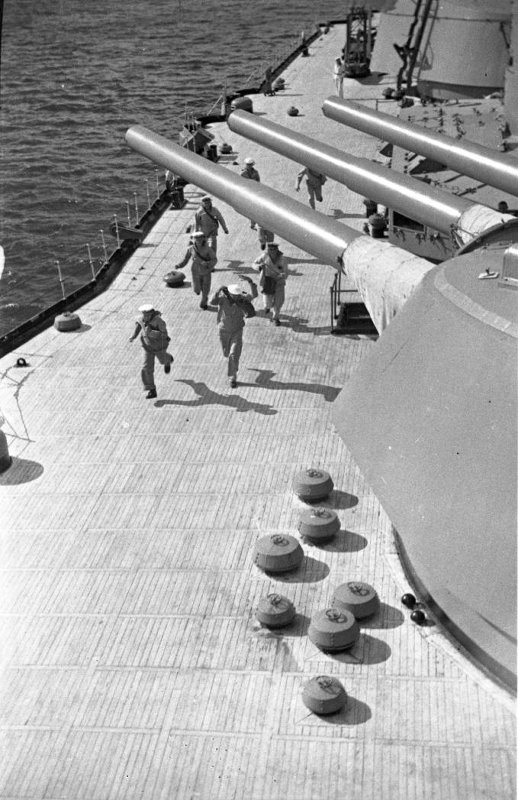
Sailors during drills aboard Parizhskaya Kommuna in the late 1930s

Parizhskaya Kommuna finished the first stage of her reconstruction in January 1938 with unresolved stability issues derived from all of the additional topweight. The options to cure this were discussed at length until Marshal Voroshilov, the People's Commissar for Defense approved the addition of anti-torpedo bulges in 1939 which would increase the ship's underwater protection and rectify her stability problem. The second part of the reconstruction was carried out between December 1939 and July 1940. A pair of bulges were fitted that extended from the forward magazine to the rear magazine that increased the ship's beam by 5.62 meters (18.4 ft). They had an unusual form that consisted of an outer void compartment intended to weaken the explosive force of the torpedo backed by a relatively narrow section immediately adjacent to the original hull that extended from above the waterline to the bottom of the bilge. This was divided into two compartments; the lower of which was kept full of either fuel oil or water to absorb splinters and fragments from the explosion while the upper compartment was filled with small watertight tubes intended to preserve the ship's waterplane area and minimize flooding from gunfire hits around the waterline. The underwater torpedo tubes were incompatible with the bulges and were removed at this time. The bulges increased her standard displacement to 30,395 tonnes (29,915 long tons; 33,505 short tons), increased her metacentric height to 2.03 meters (6 ft 8 in) and reduced her speed to 21.5 knots (39.8 km/h; 24.7 mph). The Soviets took advantage of her extra stability to reinforce her deck armor by completely replacing her middle deck armor with 76.2-millimeter (3.00 in) cemented armor plates originally intended for Admiral Nakhimov-class cruisers. These were not ideal as they were harder than desirable for deck plates, but they did have the prime virtue of being free. At some point, the exact date is unknown, her 45 mm guns were removed and sixteen 37-millimeter (1.5 in) 70-K automatic AA guns were added, three each on the fore and aft turret tops and twelve in the superstructures.

=== World War II ===
Four of Parizhskaya Kommuna's 120 mm guns were landed shortly before 22 June 1941. When the Germans invaded she was in Sevastopol, and she was initially kept in reserve during the Soviet attack on the Romanian port of Constanța. She was evacuated to Novorossiysk on 30 October after the Germans breached Soviet defensive lines near the Perekop Isthmus. During 28–29 November she bombarded German and Romanian troops south of Sevastopol with 146 12-inch and 299 120 mm shells. On 29 November, three crew were washed overboard in a storm at Sevastopol and died. They were the only crew lost during the war. Parizhskaya Kommuna ran aground but was quickly refloated. She steamed into Sevastopol's South Bay on 29 December and fired 179 and 265 120 mm shells at German troops before embarking 1,025 wounded and departing in company with the cruiser Molotov on the 31st. She bombarded German positions south of Feodosiya on the evening of 4–5 January 1942 and on 12 January. Parizhskaya Kommuna provided gunfire support during Soviet landings behind German lines along the southern coast of the Crimea three days later. She bombarded German positions west and north of Feodosiya on the nights of 26–28 February in support of an offensive by the 44th Army. She fired her last shots of the war at targets near Feodosiya during the nights of 20–22 March 1942 before returning to Poti, Georgia, to have her worn-out 12-inch guns relined. By the time this was finished the Soviets were unwilling to expose such a prominent ship to German air attacks, which had already sunk a number of cruisers and destroyers. She returned to her original name on 31 May 1943, but remained in Poti until late 1944 when she led the surviving major units of the Black Sea Fleet back to Sevastopol on 5 November. Lend-Lease British Type 290 and 291 air-warning radars were fitted during the war. She was awarded the Order of the Red Banner on 8 July 1945.

She was reclassified as a 'training battleship' on 24 July 1954 and stricken on 17 February 1956. She was scrapped at Sevastopol in 1956–1957.

== Bibliography ==
- Gardiner, Robert; Gray, Randal, eds. (1985). Conway's All the World's Fighting Ships 1906–1921. Annapolis: Naval Institute Press. ISBN 0-85177-245-5.
- Budzbon, Przemysław (1980). "Soviet Union". In Chesneau, Roger (ed.). Conway's All the World's Fighting Ships 1922–1946. Greenwich, UK: Conway Maritime Press. pp. 318–346. ISBN 0-85177-146-7.
- Budzbon, Przemysław; Radziemski, Jan & Twardowski, Marek (2022). Warships of the Soviet Fleets 1939–1945. Vol. I: Major Combatants. Annapolis, Maryland: Naval Institute Press. ISBN 978-1-68247-877-6.
- McLaughlin, Stephen (2003). Russian & Soviet Battleships. Annapolis, Maryland: Naval Institute Press. ISBN 1-55750-481-4.
- Rohwer, Jürgen (2005). Chronology of the War at Sea 1939–1945: The Naval History of World War Two (Third Revised ed.). Annapolis, Maryland: Naval Institute Press. ISBN 1-59114-119-2.
