= Russian battleship Petropavlovsk (1911) =

Russian Gangut-class battleship

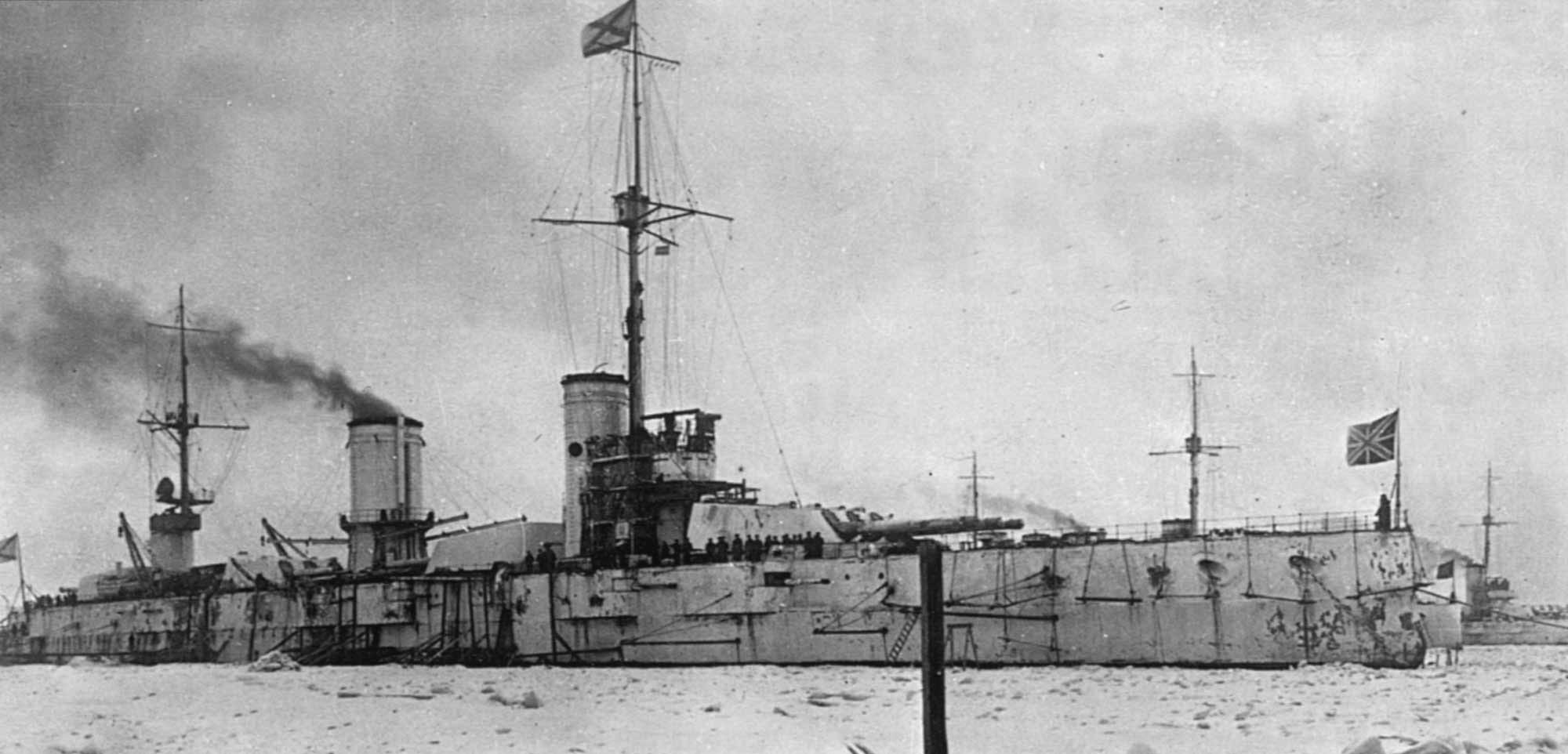
- Petropavlovsk at Helsinki

History

Russian Empire
- Name: Petropavlovsk
- Namesake: Siege of Petropavlovsk
- Builder: Baltic Works, Saint Petersburg
- Laid down: 16 June 1909 (Note: All dates used in this article are New Style)
- Launched: 22 September 1911
- Commissioned: 5 January 1915

Soviet Union
- Name: Marat (1921–1943); Petropavlovsk (1943–1950); Volkhov (1950–1953)
- Namesake: Jean-Paul Marat (1921–1943); Siege of Petropavlovsk (1943–1950); Volkhov River (1950–1953)
- Acquired: November 1917
- Renamed: Marat 31 March 1921; Petropavlovsk 31 May 1943; Volkhov 28 November 1950
- Stricken: 4 September 1953
- Fate: Sunk in September 1941 and never fully repaired, scrapped after September 1953

General characteristics
- Class & type: Gangut-class battleship
- Displacement: 24,800 tonnes (24,408 long tons)
- Length: 181.2 m (594 ft 6 in)
- Beam: 26.9 m (88 ft 3 in)
- Draft: 8.99 m (29 ft 6 in)
- Installed power: 52,000 shp (38,776 kW) (on trials)
- Propulsion: 4-shaft Parsons steam turbines; 25 Yarrow boilers
- Speed: 24.1 knots (44.6 km/h; 27.7 mph) (on trials)
- Range: 3,200 nautical miles (5,900 km; 3,700 mi) at 10 knots (19 km/h; 12 mph)
- Complement: 1,149
- Armament: 4 × triple 12 in (305 mm) guns; 16 × single 4.7 in (120 mm) guns; 1 × single 3 in (76 mm) AA gun; 4 × 17.7 in (450 mm) torpedo tubes
- Armor: Waterline belt: 125–225 mm (4.9–8.9 in); Deck: 12–50 mm (0.47–1.97 in); Turrets: 76–203 mm (3.0–8.0 in); Barbettes: 75–150 mm (3.0–5.9 in); Conning tower: 100–254 mm (3.9–10.0 in)

Petropavlovsk (Russian: Петропавловск) (renamed Marat in 1921) was the third of the four Gangut-class dreadnoughts built before World War I for the Imperial Russian Navy, the first Russian class of dreadnoughts. She was named after the Russian victory in the siege of Petropavlovsk during the Crimean War. The ship was completed during the winter of 1914–1915, but was not ready for combat until mid-1915. Her role was to defend the mouth of the Gulf of Finland against the Germans, who never tried to enter, so she spent her time training and providing cover for minelaying operations. Her crew joined the general mutiny of the Baltic Fleet after the February Revolution of 1917 and she was the only dreadnought available to the Bolsheviks for several years after the October Revolution of 1917. She bombarded the mutinous garrison of Fort Krasnaya Gorka and supported Bolshevik light forces operating against British ships supporting the White Russians in the Gulf of Finland in 1918–1919. Later, her crew joined the Kronstadt rebellion of 1921 and she was renamed Marat after the rebellion was crushed.

Marat was reconstructed from 1928 to 1931 and represented the Soviet Union at the Coronation Naval Review at Spithead in 1937. Two years later, she bombarded a Finnish coastal artillery position during the Winter War once before the Gulf of Finland iced up. Shortly afterwards, her anti-aircraft armament was upgraded. When the Germans invaded on 22 June 1941 she was in Kronstadt and provided gunfire support to Soviet troops in September as the Germans approached Leningrad. Later that month she had her bow blown off and sank in shallow water after two hits by 1,000-kilogram (2,200 lb) bombs (dropped by two Ju 87 Stukas, one of which was piloted by Hans-Ulrich Rudel) that detonated her forward magazine. The remaining rear section was refloated several months later and became a stationary artillery battery, providing gunfire support during the siege of Leningrad. Marat resumed her original name in 1943 and plans were made to reconstruct her after the war, using the bow of her sister Frunze, but they were not accepted and were formally cancelled in 1948. Petropavlovsk was renamed Volkhov in 1950, after the nearby Volkhov River, and served as a stationary training ship until stricken in 1953 and broken up afterwards.

== Design ==
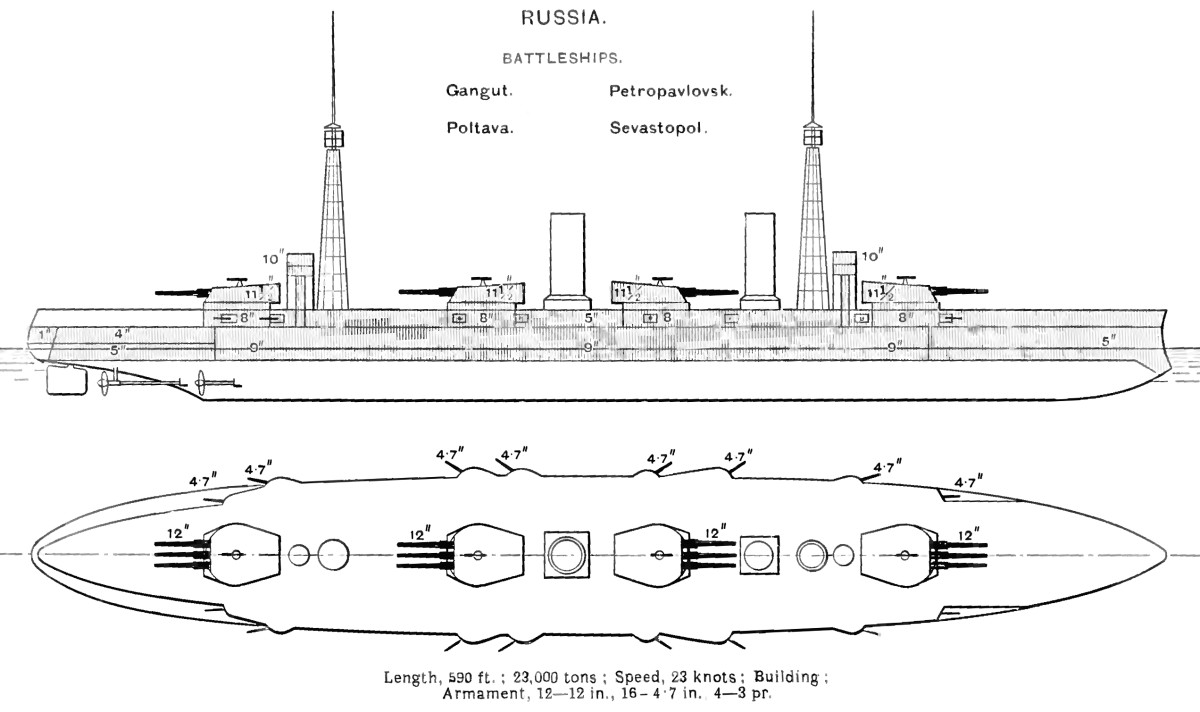
Starboard elevation and plan view of the Gangut class

Petropavlovsk was 180 meters (590 ft 7 in) long at the waterline and 181.2 meters (594 ft 6 in) long overall. She had a beam of 26.9 meters (88 ft 3 in) and a draft of 8.99 meters (29 ft 6 in), 49 centimeters (1 ft 7 in) more than designed. Her displacement was 24,800 tonnes (24,408 long tons) at load, over 1,500 t (1,476 long tons) more than her designed displacement of 23,288 t (22,920 long tons).

Petropavlovsk's machinery was built by the Baltic Works. Four Parsons-type steam turbine sets drove the four propellers. The engine rooms were located between turrets three and four in three compartments. The outer compartments each had a high-pressure ahead and reverse turbine for each wing propeller shaft. The central engine room had two low-pressure ahead and astern turbines as well as two cruising turbines driving each of the two center shafts. The engines had a total designed output of 42,000 shaft horsepower (31,319 kW), but they produced 52,000 shp (38,776 kW) during her sister Poltava's full-speed trials on 21 November 1915 and gave a top speed of 24.1 knots (44.6 km/h; 27.7 mph). Twenty-five Yarrow boilers provided steam to the engines at a designed working pressure of 17.5 standard atmospheres (1,770 kPa; 257 psi). Each boiler was fitted with Thornycroft oil sprayers for mixed oil/coal burning. They were arranged in two groups. The forward group consisted of two boiler rooms in front of the second turret, the foremost of which had three boilers while the second one had six. The rear group was between the second and third turrets and comprised two compartments, each with eight boilers. At full load she carried 1,847.5 long tons (1,877 t) of coal and 700 long tons (711 t) of fuel oil and that provided her a range of 3,500 nautical miles (6,500 km; 4,000 mi) at a speed of 10 knots (19 km/h; 12 mph).

The main armament of the Ganguts consisted of a dozen 52-caliber Obukhovskii 12-inch (305 mm) Pattern 1907 guns mounted in four triple turrets distributed the length of the ship. The Russians did not believe that superfiring turrets offered any advantage, discounting the value of axial fire and believing that superfiring turrets could not fire while over the lower turret because of muzzle blast problems. They also believed that distributing the turrets, and their associated magazines, over the length of the ship improved the survivability of the ship. Sixteen 50-caliber 4.7-inch (119 mm) Pattern 1905 guns were mounted in casemates as the secondary battery intended to defend the ship against torpedo boats. The ships were completed with only a single 30-caliber 3-inch (76 mm) Lender anti-aircraft (AA) gun mounted on the quarterdeck. Other AA guns were probably added during the course of World War I, but details are lacking. Budzbon says that four 75-millimeter (3.0 in) were added to the roofs of the end turrets during the war. Four 17.7-inch (450 mm) submerged torpedo tubes were mounted with three torpedoes for each tube.

== Construction and career ==
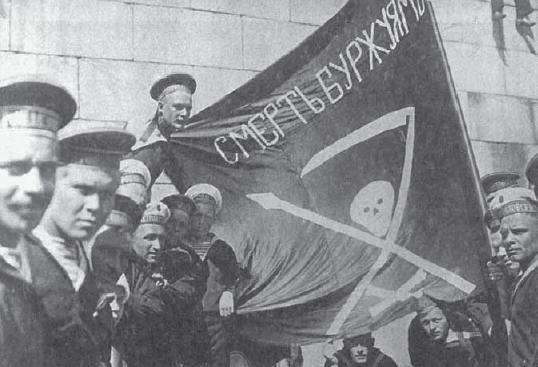
Sailors of Petropavlovsk in Helsinki, 1917

Petropavlovsk was built by the Baltic Works in Saint Petersburg. Her keel was laid down on 16 June 1909 and she was launched on 22 September 1911. She entered service on 5 January 1915, six months after the start of World War I, when she reached Helsinki and was assigned to the First Battleship Brigade of the Baltic Fleet. Petropavlovsk and her sister Gangut provided distant cover for minelaying operations on 10–11 November and 6 December 1915. She saw no action of any kind during 1916. Her crew joined the general mutiny of the Baltic Fleet on 16 March 1917, after the idle sailors received word of the February Revolution in Saint Petersburg. On 26 October, Petropavlovsk ran aground. She was refloated on 13 November with assistance from Gangut. The Treaty of Brest-Litovsk required the Soviets to evacuate their naval base at Helsinki in March 1918 or have their ships interned by newly independent Finland even though the Gulf of Finland was still frozen over. Petropavlovsk and her sisters led the first group of ships on 12 March and reached Kronstadt five days later in what became known as the "Ice Voyage".

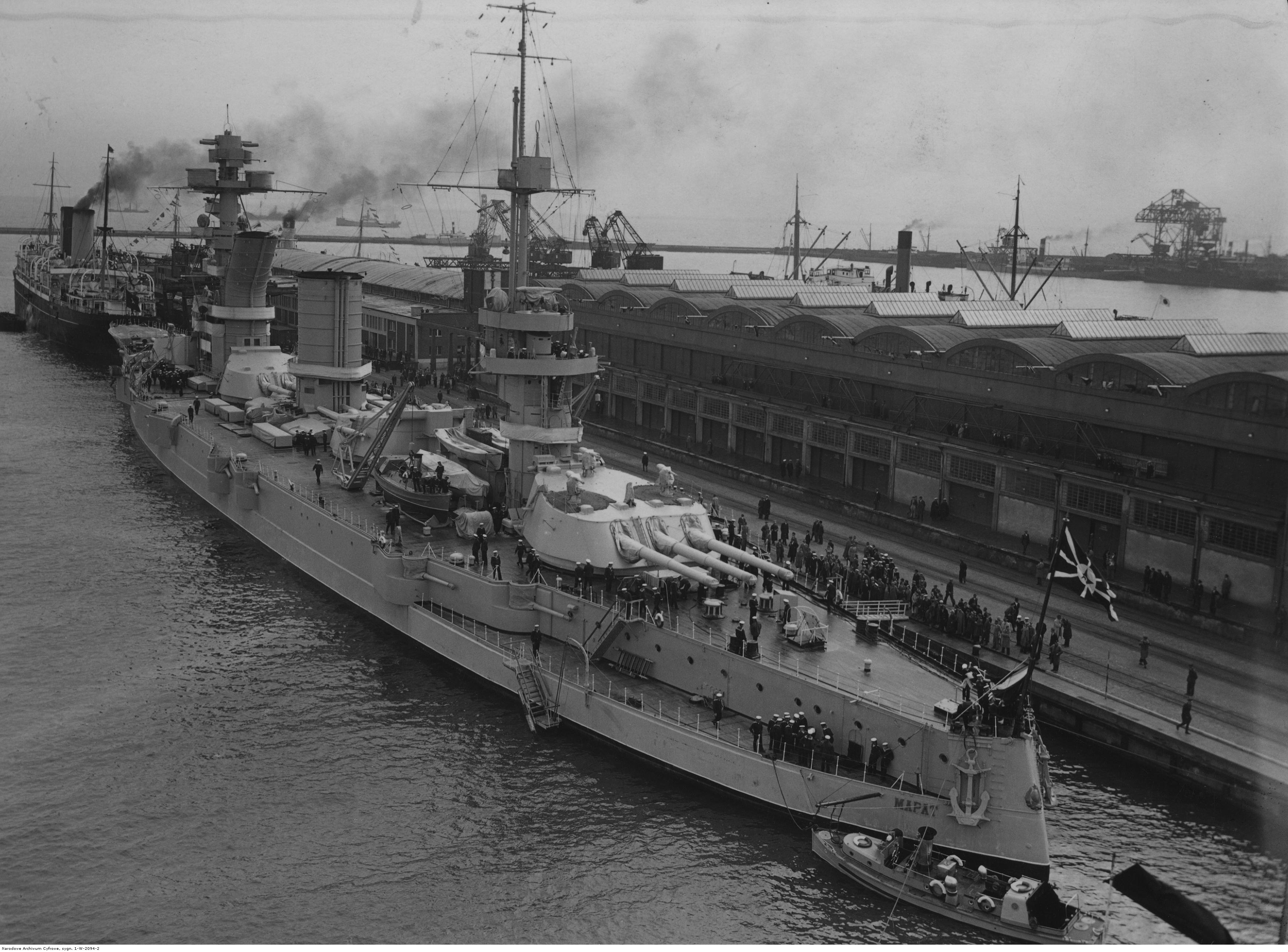
Marat visiting Gdynia in 1934

Petropavlovsk was the only operable dreadnought belonging to the Soviets and provided cover to smaller ships on raiding missions. On 31 May 1919 she fired in support of the Russian destroyer Azard and several minesweepers that had taken the bait laid by the British forces supporting the White Russians. The British destroyer HMS Walker appeared to be operating alone and the Soviets sortied to attack her, but a number of other British destroyers were positioned to sweep in behind the Soviets. Azard retreated at full speed and Petropavlovsk opened fire on Walker at about 14,000 yards (12,802 m). She hit Walker twice, inflicting only minor damage and wounding two sailors, and the British destroyers eventually disengaged when they got too close to Soviet coastal artillery and minefields. A few days later Petropavlovsk and the pre-dreadnought battleship Andrei Pervozvanny bombarded Fort Krasnaya Gorka whose garrison had mutinied against the Bolsheviks. She fired no fewer than 568 12-inch shells and the garrison surrendered on 17 June when Leon Trotsky promised them their lives, only to subsequently order them machine-gunned. On 17 August 1919 Petropavlovsk was claimed as torpedoed and put out of action by the British Coastal Motor Boat CMB 88 during a night attack in Kronstadt harbor, but was, in fact, not damaged at all. The crew of Petropavlovsk joined the Kronstadt rebellion of March 1921. After it was bloodily crushed she was renamed Marat to honor the French revolutionary leader Jean-Paul Marat on 31 March 1921. By 1922 her primary rangefinder had been moved to a platform on the foremast and she mounted three 3-inch "Lender" AA guns each on the roofs of the fore and aft turrets.

Marat was partially reconstructed between the northern autumn of 1928 and 8 April 1931 at the Baltic Works. The most obvious external change was a much more elaborate forward superstructure needed to house new fire control instruments. A KDP-6 fire-control director, with two 6-meter (20 ft) Zeiss rangefinders, was positioned at the top of the tubular foremast. An 8-meter (26 ft) Zeiss rangefinder was also added on the rear superstructure. The top of the forward funnel was lengthened by about 2 meters (6 ft 7 in) and angled backwards in an attempt to keep the exhaust gases away from the control and gunnery spaces. A derrick was added to the mainmast to handle a KR-1 flying boat imported from Germany that was stored above the third turret. No aircraft catapult was fitted so the aircraft had to take off and land on the water. A forecastle was added to the bow, which was also given much more sheer and flare to improve her sea-keeping abilities. Her turrets were overhauled, her guns replaced and new 8-meter rangefinders were installed on every turret. Her boilers were converted to only burn fuel oil and the more powerful boilers allowed the forward three boilers to be removed. The space freed up was used for anti-aircraft ammunition and various control spaces. The cruising turbines were also removed which simplified the ship's machinery at a small cost in power. These changes increased her displacement to 26,170 tonnes (25,757 long tons) at full load and her overall length to 184 meters (604 ft). Her metacentric height increased to 1.93 meters (6 ft 4 in) from her designed 1.76 meters (5 ft 9 in) mainly because she now carried much of her fuel in her double bottom rather than in coal bunkers high on the sides of the ship. More weight was added to her before World War II, including an increase in the thickness of her turret roofs to 152 millimeters (6.0 in), that decreased her metacentric height to only 1.7 meters (5 ft 7 in). This was unsatisfactory and plans were made to reconstruct her again, but they were cancelled when the Germans attacked in 1941.

Marat took part in the 1937 Coronation Review in Britain. Her participation in the Winter War was minimal as she bombarded Finnish 10-inch (254 mm) coast defense guns one time at Saarenpää in the Koivisto Islands with 133 high explosive shells before the Gulf of Finland iced over. In early 1940 her anti-aircraft armament was reinforced. She exchanged her elderly 3-inch "Lender" guns for modern 76.2-millimeter (3 in) 34-K guns and two twin-gun 76.2 mm 81-K mounts were mounted on her quarterdeck. The magazines for these guns were situated in the rearmost casemates on each beam, which lost their 120 mm guns. At some point six automatic 37-millimeter (1.5 in) 70-K guns were also added. These additions boosted her displacement to 26,700 tonnes (26,278 long tons) at full load. She sailed to Tallinn shortly after the Soviets occupied Estonia, although she returned to Kronstadt on 20 June 1941, two days before the German invasion of Russia began. Marat opened fire on troop positions of the German 18th Army from the Leningrad Sea Canal on 8 September. She was lightly damaged by German 15-centimeter (5.9 in) guns on 16 September.

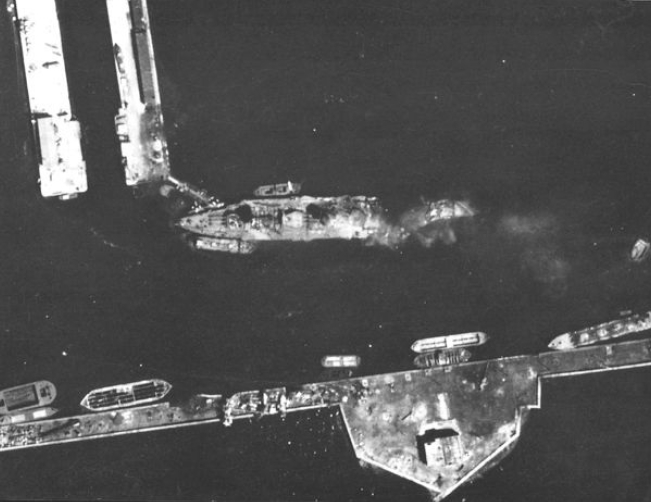
Luftwaffe aerial photograph of Marat in Kronstadt, leaking oil after her magazine explosion

She was sunk at her moorings on 23 September 1941 by two near-simultaneous hits by 1,000-kilogram (2,200 lb) bombs near the forward superstructure. They caused the explosion of the forward magazine which heaved the turret up, blew the superstructure and forward funnel over to starboard and demolished the forward part of the hull from frames 20 to 57. 326 men were killed and the ship gradually settled to the bottom in 11 meters (36 ft) of water. Her sinking is commonly credited to the Stuka pilot Oberleutnant Hans-Ulrich Rudel of III./StG 2, but Rudel dropped only one of the two bombs. The rear part of the ship was later refloated and she was used as a floating battery although all of her 120 mm guns were removed. Initially only the two rearmost turrets were operable, but the second turret was repaired by the autumn of 1942. She fired a total of 1,971 twelve-inch shells during the siege of Leningrad. In December 1941 granite slabs 40–60 millimeters (1.6–2.4 in) thick from the nearby harbor walls were laid on her decks to reinforce her deck protection. Another transverse bulkhead was built behind frame 57 and the space between them was filled with concrete to prevent her sinking if the original bulkhead was ruptured.

She resumed her original name on 31 May 1943. After the war there were several plans to reconstruct her, using the bow of the Frunze, but they were not accepted and were formally cancelled on 29 June 1948. She was renamed Volkhov, after the nearby river, on 28 November 1950 and served as a stationary training ship until stricken on 4 September 1953. The ship was subsequently broken up.

== Bibliography ==
- Budzbon, Przemysław (1985). "Russia". In Gray, Randal (ed.). Conway's All the World's Fighting Ships 1906–1921. Annapolis, Maryland: Naval Institute Press. pp. 291–325. ISBN 0-85177-245-5.
- Budzbon, Przemysław (1980). "Soviet Union". In Chesneau, Roger (ed.). Conway's All the World's Fighting Ships 1922–1946. Greenwich, UK: Conway Maritime Press. pp. 318–346. ISBN 0-85177-146-7.
- Budzbon, Przemysław; Radziemski, Jan & Twardowski, Marek (2022). Warships of the Soviet Fleets 1939–1945. Vol. I: Major Combatants. Annapolis, Maryland: Naval Institute Press. ISBN 978-1-68247-877-6.
- Head, Michael (2009). "The Baltic Campaign, 1918–1920, Pts. I, II". Warship International. XLVI (2–3): 135–150, 217–239. ISSN 0043-0374.
- McLaughlin, Stephen (2003). Russian & Soviet Battleships. Annapolis, Maryland: Naval Institute Press. ISBN 1-55750-481-4.
- Rohwer, Jürgen (2005). Chronology of the War at Sea 1939–1945: The Naval History of World War Two (Third Revised ed.). Annapolis, Maryland: Naval Institute Press. ISBN 1-59114-119-2.
- Stephen, Martin & Grove, Eric (1988). Sea Battles in Close-up: World War 2. Annapolis, Maryland: Naval Institute Press. ISBN 0-87021-556-6.
