= Russian battleship Gangut =

Russian lead ship of Gangut-class

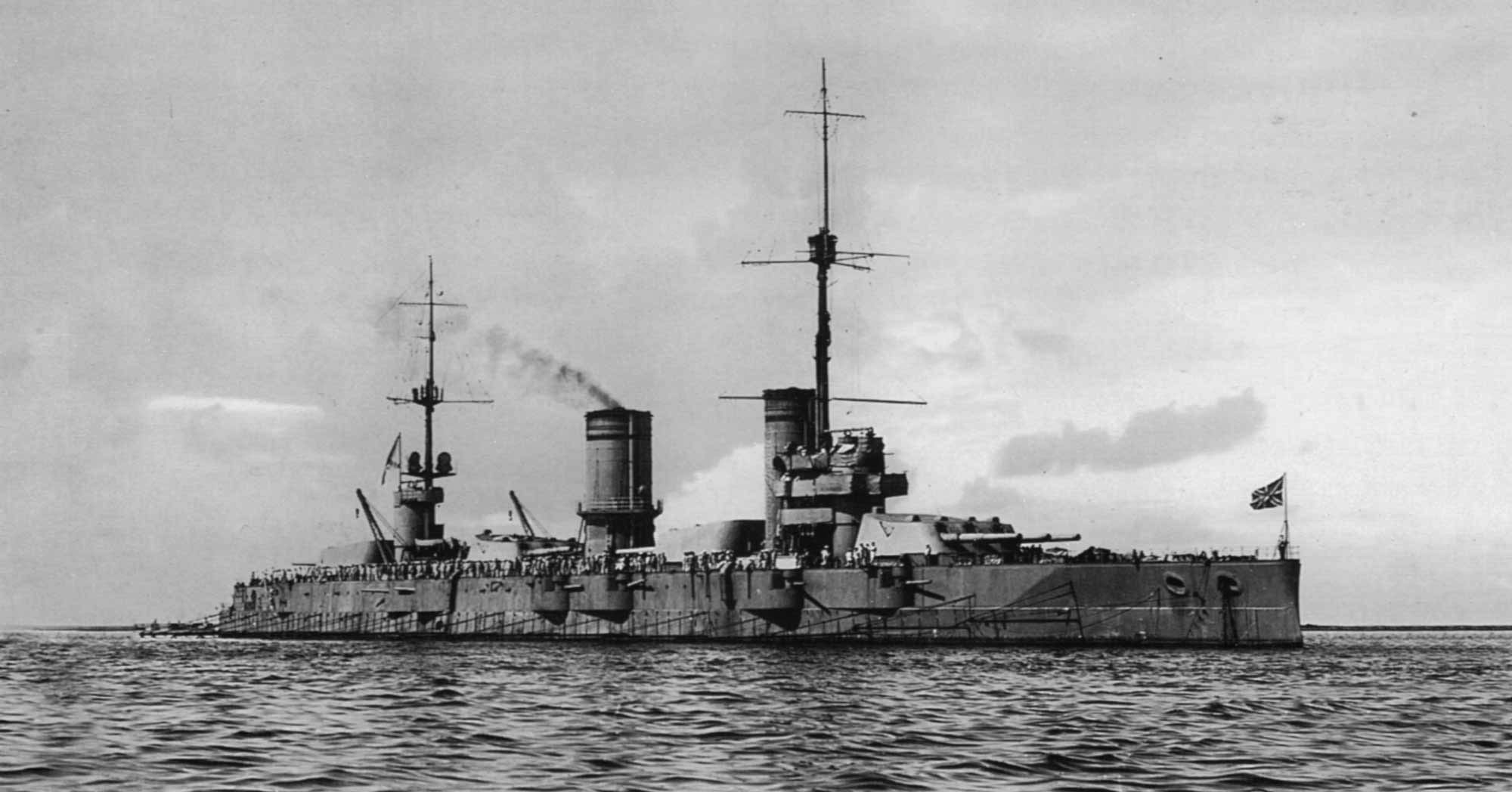
- Gangut at anchor in Helsinki, 1915

History

Russian Empire
- Name: Gangut
- Namesake: Battle of Gangut
- Builder: Admiralty Works, Saint Petersburg
- Laid down: 16 June 1909 (Note: All dates used in this article are New Style)
- Launched: 20 October 1911
- Commissioned: 11 January 1915

Soviet Union
- Name: Oktyabrskaya Revolutsiya
- Namesake: October Revolution
- Acquired: November 1917
- Renamed: 27 June 1925
- Reclassified: 24 July 1954
- Stricken: 17 February 1956
- Nickname(s): Oktyabrina
- Honors and awards: Order of the Red Banner 22 July 1944

General characteristics (as built)
- Class & type: Gangut-class battleship
- Displacement: 24,800 tonnes (24,400 long tons; 27,300 short tons)
- Length: 181.2 m (594 ft)
- Beam: 26.9 m (88 ft)
- Draft: 8.99 m (29.5 ft)
- Propulsion: 4-shaft Parsons steam turbines; 25 Yarrow boilers; 52,000 shp (38,776 kW) (on trials)
- Speed: 24.1 knots (44.6 km/h; 27.7 mph) (on trials)
- Range: 3,200 nautical miles (5,900 km; 3,700 mi) at 10 knots (19 km/h; 12 mph)
- Complement: 1,149
- Armament: 4 × triple 12 in (305 mm) guns; 16 × single 4.7 in (120 mm) guns; 1 × single 3 in (76 mm) AA gun; 4 × 17.7 in (450 mm) torpedo tubes
- Armor: Waterline belt: 125–225 mm (4.9–8.9 in); Deck: 12–50 mm (0.47–1.97 in); Turrets: 76–203 mm (3.0–8.0 in); Barbettes: 75–150 mm (3.0–5.9 in); Conning tower: 100–254 mm (3.9–10.0 in)

Gangut (Russian: Гангут) was both the lead ship of the Gangut-class dreadnoughts of the Imperial Russian Navy built before World War I and the last of her class to be completed. She was named after the Russian victory over the Swedish Navy in the Battle of Gangut in 1714. She was completed during the winter of 1914–1915, but was not ready for combat until mid-1915. Her role was to defend the mouth of the Gulf of Finland against the Germans, who never tried to enter, so she spent her time training and providing cover for minelaying operations. Her crew joined the general mutiny of the Baltic Fleet after the February Revolution and joined the Bolsheviks in 1918. She was laid up in 1918 for lack of manpower and not recommissioned until 1925, by which time she had been renamed Oktyabrskaya Revolutsiya (Russian: Октябрьская революция: October Revolution).

She was reconstructed between 1931 and 1934 with new boilers, fire-control systems and greatly enlarged superstructures. During the Winter War she bombarded Finnish coastal artillery positions once. Her anti-aircraft armament was greatly reinforced in early 1941, just before Operation Barbarossa. She provided gunfire support against the Germans during the Siege of Leningrad despite being bombed three times and under repair for a year. Retained on active duty after the war she became a training ship in 1954 before being struck off the Navy List in 1956 and slowly scrapped.

== Design and description ==
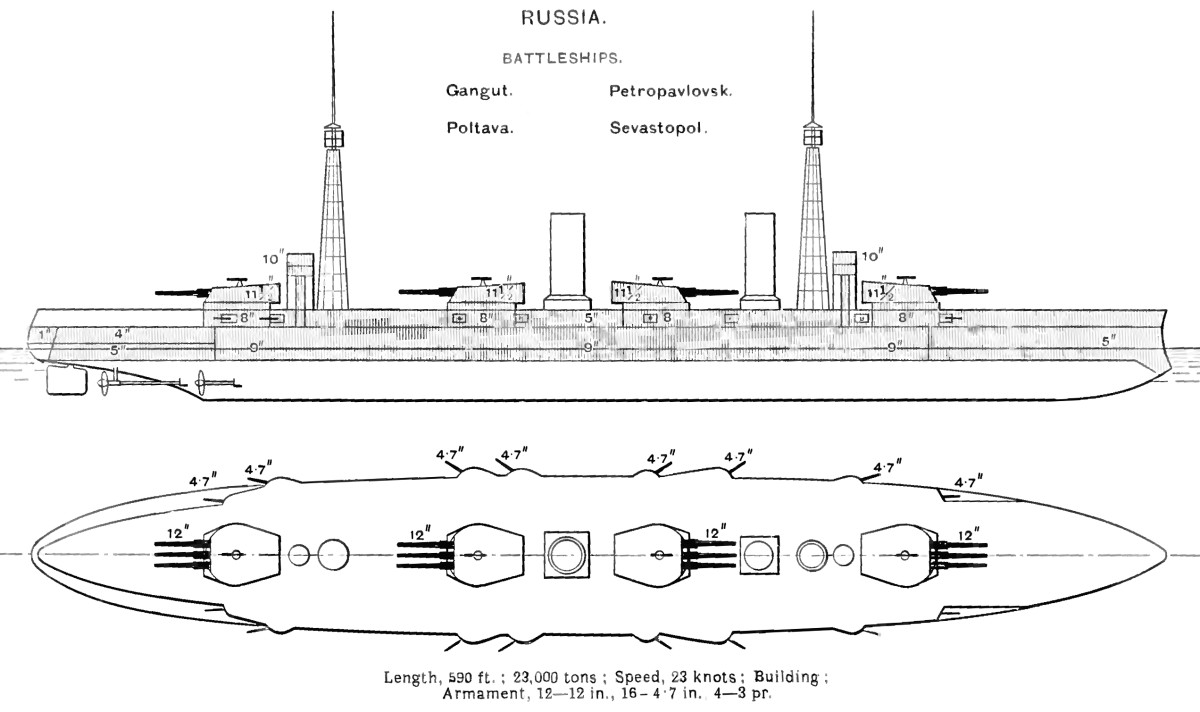
Plan view of the Gangut class

Gangut was 180 meters (590 ft) long at the waterline and 181.2 meters (594 ft) long overall. She had a beam of 26.9 meters (88 ft) and a draft of 8.99 meters (29.5 ft), 49 centimeters (1.61 ft) more than designed. Her displacement was 24,800 tonnes (24,400 long tons; 27,300 short tons) at load, over 1,500 t (1,500 long tons; 1,700 short tons) more than her designed displacement of 23,288 t (22,920 long tons; 25,671 short tons).

Gangut's machinery was built by the Franco-Russian Works. Four Parsons-type steam turbines drove the four propellers. The engine rooms were located between turrets three and four in three transverse compartments. The outer compartments each had a high-pressure ahead and reverse turbine for each wing propeller shaft. The central engine room had two each low-pressure ahead and astern turbines as well as two cruising turbines driving the two center shafts. The engines had a total designed output of 42,000 shaft horsepower (31,319 kW), but they produced 52,000 shp (38,776 kW) during her sister Poltava's full-speed trials on 21 November 1915 and gave a top speed of 24.1 knots (44.6 km/h; 27.7 mph). Twenty-five Yarrow boilers provided steam to the engines at a designed working pressure of 17.5 standard atmospheres (1,770 kPa; 257 psi). Each boiler was fitted with Thornycroft oil sprayers for mixed oil/coal burning. They were arranged in two groups. The forward group consisted of two boiler rooms in front of the second turret, the foremost of which had three boilers while the second one had six. The rear group was between the second and third turrets and comprised two compartments, each with eight boilers. At full load she carried 1,847.5 long tons (1,877.1 t) of coal and 700 long tons (710 t) of fuel oil and that provided her a range of 3,500 nautical miles (6,500 km) at a speed of 10 knots (19 km/h).

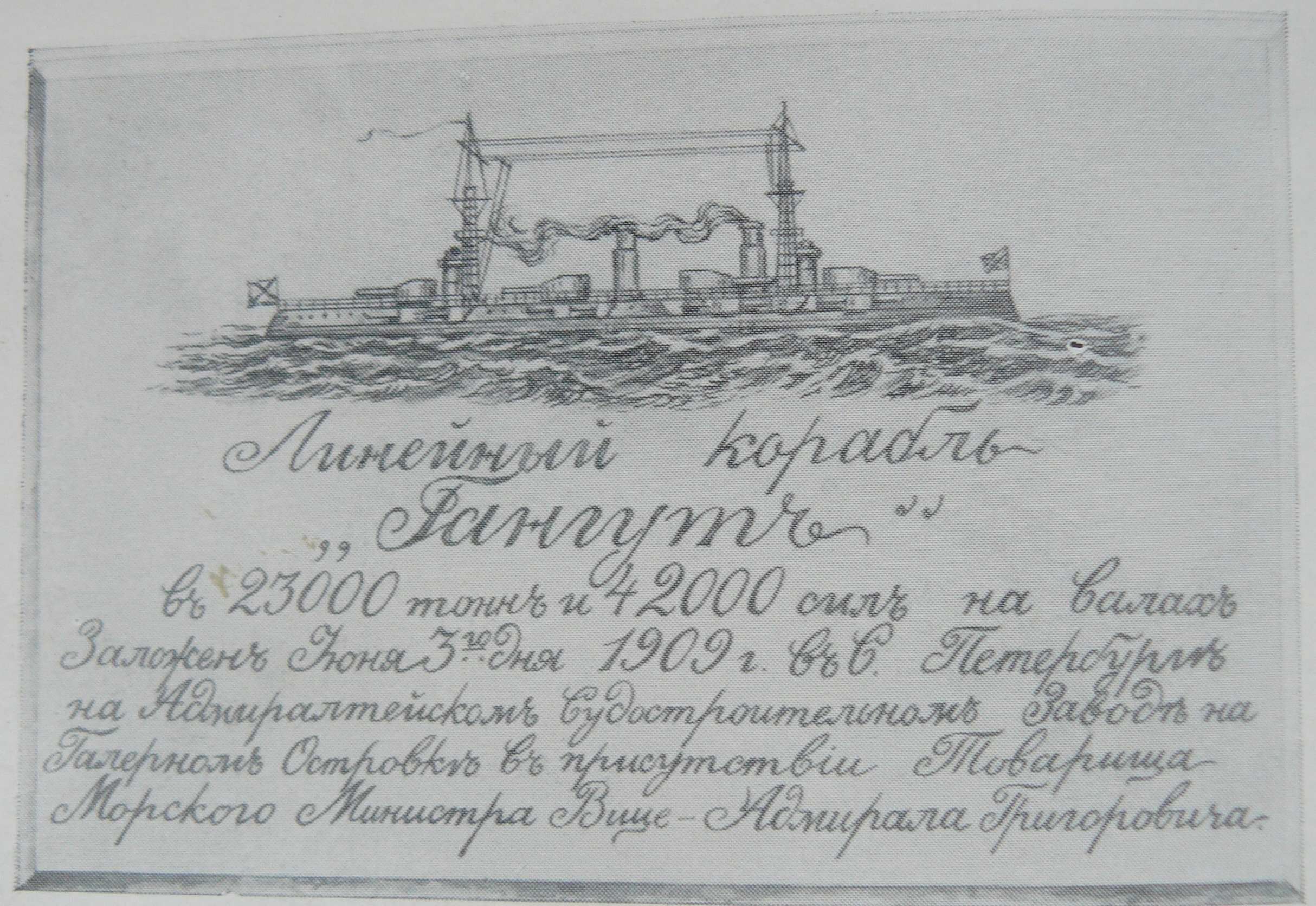
Silver plaque of Gangut

The main armament of the Ganguts consisted of a dozen 52-caliber Obukhovskii 12-inch (305 mm) Pattern 1907 guns mounted in four triple turrets distributed the length of the ship. The Russians did not believe that superfiring turrets offered any advantage, discounting the value of axial fire and believing that superfiring turrets could not fire while over the lower turret because of muzzle blast problems. They also believed that distributing the turrets, and their associated magazines, over the length of the ship improved the survivability of the ship. Sixteen 50-caliber 4.7-inch (119 mm) Pattern 1905 guns were mounted in casemates as the secondary battery intended to defend the ship against torpedo boats. The ships were completed with only a single 30-caliber 3-inch (76 mm) Lender anti-aircraft (AA) gun mounted on the quarterdeck. Other AA guns were probably added during the course of World War I, but details are lacking. Budzbon says that four 75-millimeter (3.0 in) were added to the roofs of the end turrets during the war. Four 17.7-inch (450 mm) submerged torpedo tubes were mounted with three torpedoes for each tube.

== Service ==
Gangut was built by the Admiralty Works in Saint Petersburg. Her keel was laid down on 16 June 1909 and she was launched on 22 September 1911. At the end of October 1914, she collided with her sister Poltava which delayed her trials, scheduled for 9 November 1914, to late December 1914. She entered service on 11 January 1915 when she reached Helsinki and was assigned to the First Battleship Brigade of the Baltic Fleet. Gangut and her sister Sevastopol provided distant cover for minelaying operations south of Liepāja on 27 August, the furthest that any Russian dreadnought ventured out of the Gulf of Finland during World War I. She ran aground on 10 September, but suffered only minor damage. A minor mutiny broke out on 1 November when the executive officer refused to feed the crew the traditional meal of meat and macaroni after coaling. The return of the captain and the issue of a dinner of tinned meat restored order on the ship. On 10–11 November and 6 December Gangut and her sister Petropavlovsk again provided distant cover for minelaying operations. She saw no action of any kind during 1916. Her crew joined the general mutiny of the Baltic Fleet on 16 March 1917, after the idle sailors received word of the February Revolution in Saint Petersburg. The Treaty of Brest-Litovsk required the Soviets to evacuate their base at Helsinki in March 1918 or have them interned by newly independent Finland even though the Gulf of Finland was still frozen over. Gangut and her sisters led the first group of ships on 12 March and reached Kronstadt five days later in what became known as the 'Ice Voyage'.

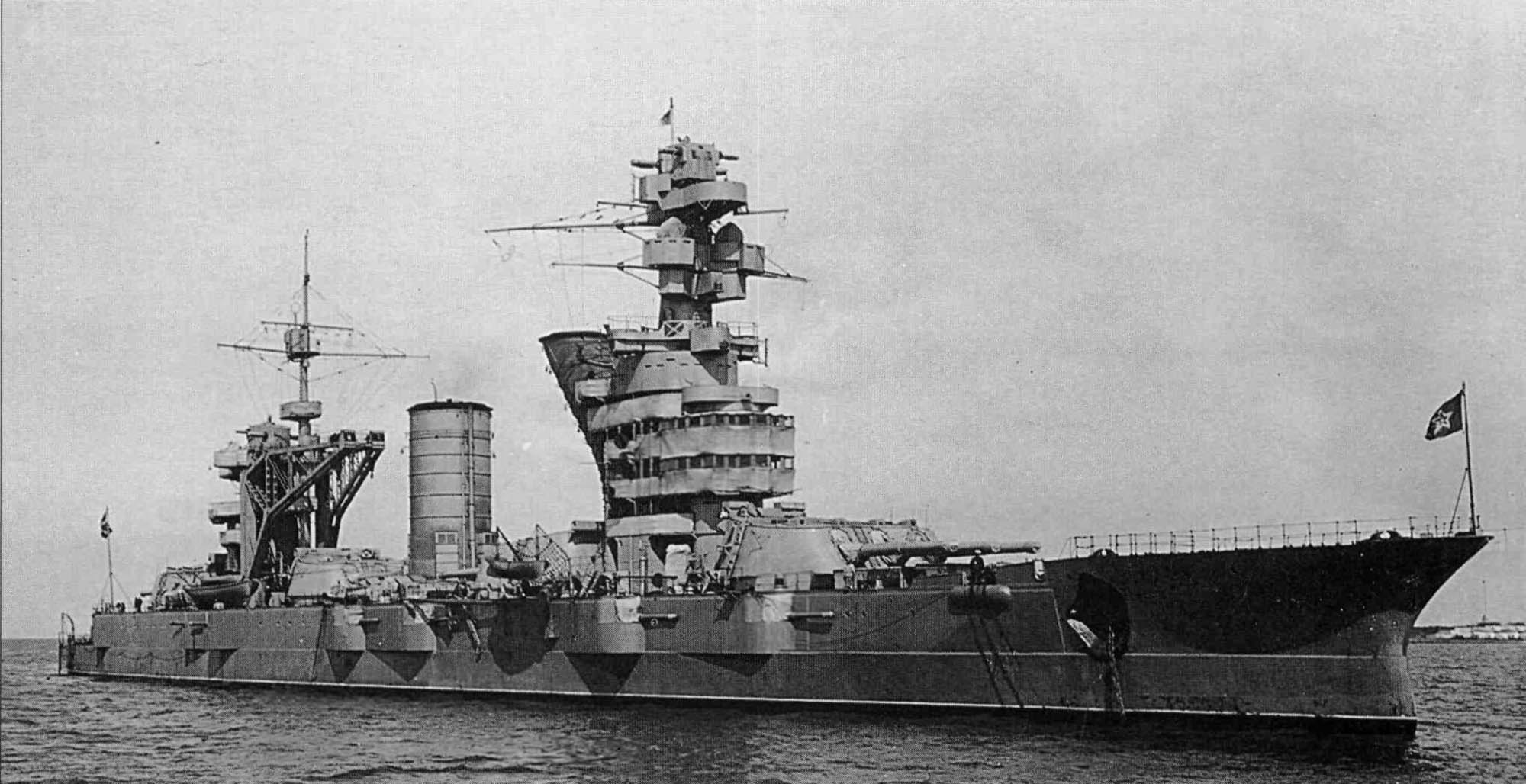
Oktyabrskaya Revolutsiya in 1934, after her modernization

Gangut was laid up on 9 November 1918 for lack of manpower and was renamed Oktyabrskaya Revolutsiya on 27 June 1925 while she was being refitted. She was recommissioned on 23 March 1926 and began a partial reconstruction on 12 October 1931, incorporating the lessons from the earlier modernizations of her sisters Marat and Parizhskaya Kommuna. The tubular tower-mast was replaced by a larger and sturdier structure with a KDP-6 fire control director, equipped with two 6-meter (20 ft) Zeiss rangefinders positioned on top. The aft superstructure was enlarged and a new structure was built just forward of it, with another KDP-6 director surmounting it, which required the repositioning of the mainmast 9 meters (30 ft) forward. This did not leave enough room for a derrick, as was used on Marat, so two large boat cranes were mounted on each side of the mainmast. Her funnel was curved to the rear rather than angled like Marat. Each turret received Italian 8-meter (26 ft) rangefinders and their roof armor was increased to 152-millimeter (6.0 in) in thickness. A new forecastle, much like that of Marat, was fitted to improve seakeeping. Six 76.2-millimeter (3.00 in) 34-K anti-aircraft (AA) guns were added, three on the roofs of the fore and aft turrets. All twenty-five of her old boilers were replaced by a dozen oil-fired boilers originally intended for the Borodino-class battlecruiser Izmail. The space saved was used to add another inboard longitudinal watertight bulkhead that greatly improved her underwater protection. Her original Pollen Argo Clock mechanical fire-control computer was upgraded with a copy of a Vickers Ltd fire-control computer, designated AKUR by the Soviets, as well as a copy of a Sperry stable vertical gyroscope. These changes increased her displacement to 26,690 tonnes (26,270 long tons; 29,420 short tons) at full load and her overall length to 184.9 meters (607 ft). Her metacentric height decreased to 1.67 meters (5 ft 6 in) from her designed 1.76 meters (5 ft 9 in) as a result of her enlarged superstructures.

She finished her reconstruction on 4 August 1934. Her participation in the Winter War was limited to a bombardment of Finnish 10-inch (254 mm) coast defense guns on 18 December 1939 at Saarenpää in the Beryozovye Islands before the Gulf of Finland iced over. She failed to inflict any permanent damage before she was driven off by near misses. Oktyabrskaya Revolutsiya sailed to Tallinn shortly after the Soviets occupied Estonia, but she was refitted in February–March 1941 in Kronstadt and her anti-aircraft armament was reinforced. Two twin-gun 76.2 mm (3 in) 81-K mounts were mounted on her quarterdeck. The magazines for these guns were probably situated in the rearmost casemates on each beam, which lost their 120-mm guns and twelve automatic 37-millimeter (1.5 in) 70-K guns were also added, three guns each on the middle turrets and the other six in the fore and aft superstructures. Four twin and four single 12.7-millimeter (0.50 in) DShK machine guns and two AA directors were also fitted. The large cranes were replaced by smaller ones taken from the ex-German heavy cruiser Petropavlovsk to make room for the anti-aircraft guns.

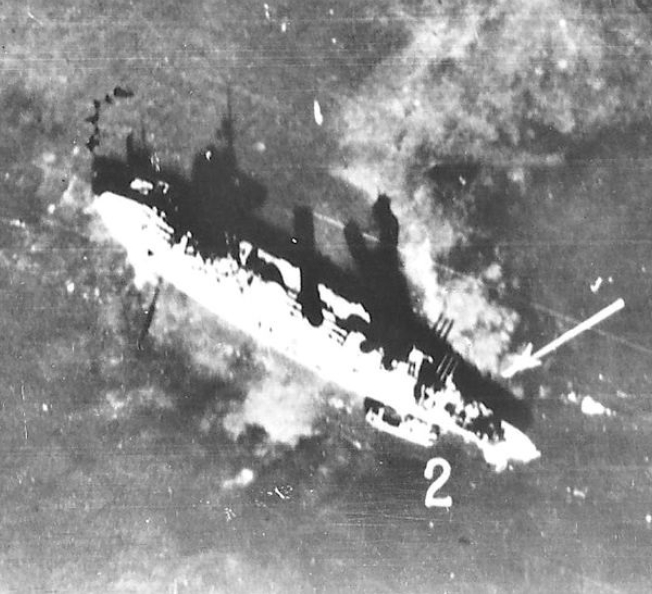
Luftwaffe aerial photograph of the damaged Oktyabrskaya Revolutsiya in Kronstadt, 23 September 1941

Sailors gather by a main turret gun during a naval parade in the Tallinn roadstead, 1946

Sailors on the bow of Oktyabrskaya Revolutsiya during a naval parade in the Tallinn roadstead, 1946

On 22 June 1941 Oktyabrskaya Revolutsiya was in Tallinn when the Germans invaded the Soviet Union, but she was forced to sail for Kronstadt by the advancing Germans. She opened fire on troop positions of the German 18th Army on 8 September from the channel between Leningrad and Kronstadt, and probably landed four 120-millimeter (4.7 in) guns on the following day for use ashore. She was badly damaged on 21 September by three bomb hits on her bow that knocked out two turrets and she was sent to the Ordzhonikidze Yard on 23 October for repairs. The Soviets took advantage of this time to add four more 37-mm 70-K AA guns and another twin 76.2-mm K-81 gun mount between February and April 1942. She was hit again by one heavy and three medium bombs dropped by Heinkel He 111s of KG 4 during the night of 4–5 April. and again by three bombs on 24 April. Her repairs were completed in November 1942, although a quadruple 37-mm 46-K gun mount was added in September. She supported Soviet forces during the Siege of Leningrad, the Leningrad–Novgorod Offensive in January 1944 and the Vyborg–Petrozavodsk Offensive in June 1944. She received a Lend-Lease British Type 279 air-warning radar sometime during 1944. On 22 July 1944 she was awarded the Order of the Red Banner.

She was reclassified as a 'school battleship' on 24 July 1954 and stricken on 17 February 1956. She was slowly scrapped and her hulk still survived in May 1958.

Oktyabrskaya Revolutsiya during a naval parade off Tallinn, 1946

== Bibliography ==
- Budzbon, Przemysław (1985). "Russia". In Gray, Randal (ed.). Conway's All the World's Fighting Ships 1906–1921. Annapolis, Maryland: Naval Institute Press. pp. 291–325. ISBN 0-85177-245-5.
- Budzbon, Przemysław (1980). "Soviet Union". In Chesneau, Roger (ed.). Conway's All the World's Fighting Ships 1922–1946. Greenwich, UK: Conway Maritime Press. pp. 318–346. ISBN 0-85177-146-7.
- Budzbon, Przemysław; Radziemski, Jan & Twardowski, Marek (2022). Warships of the Soviet Fleets 1939–1945. Vol. I: Major Combatants. Annapolis, Maryland: Naval Institute Press. ISBN 978-1-68247-877-6.
- McLaughlin, Stephen (2003). Russian & Soviet Battleships. Annapolis, Maryland: Naval Institute Press. ISBN 1-55750-481-4.
- Rohwer, Jürgen (2005). Chronology of the War at Sea 1939–1945: The Naval History of World War Two (Third Revised ed.). Annapolis, Maryland: Naval Institute Press. ISBN 1-59114-119-2.
