= Fitting out =

Process in shipbuilding

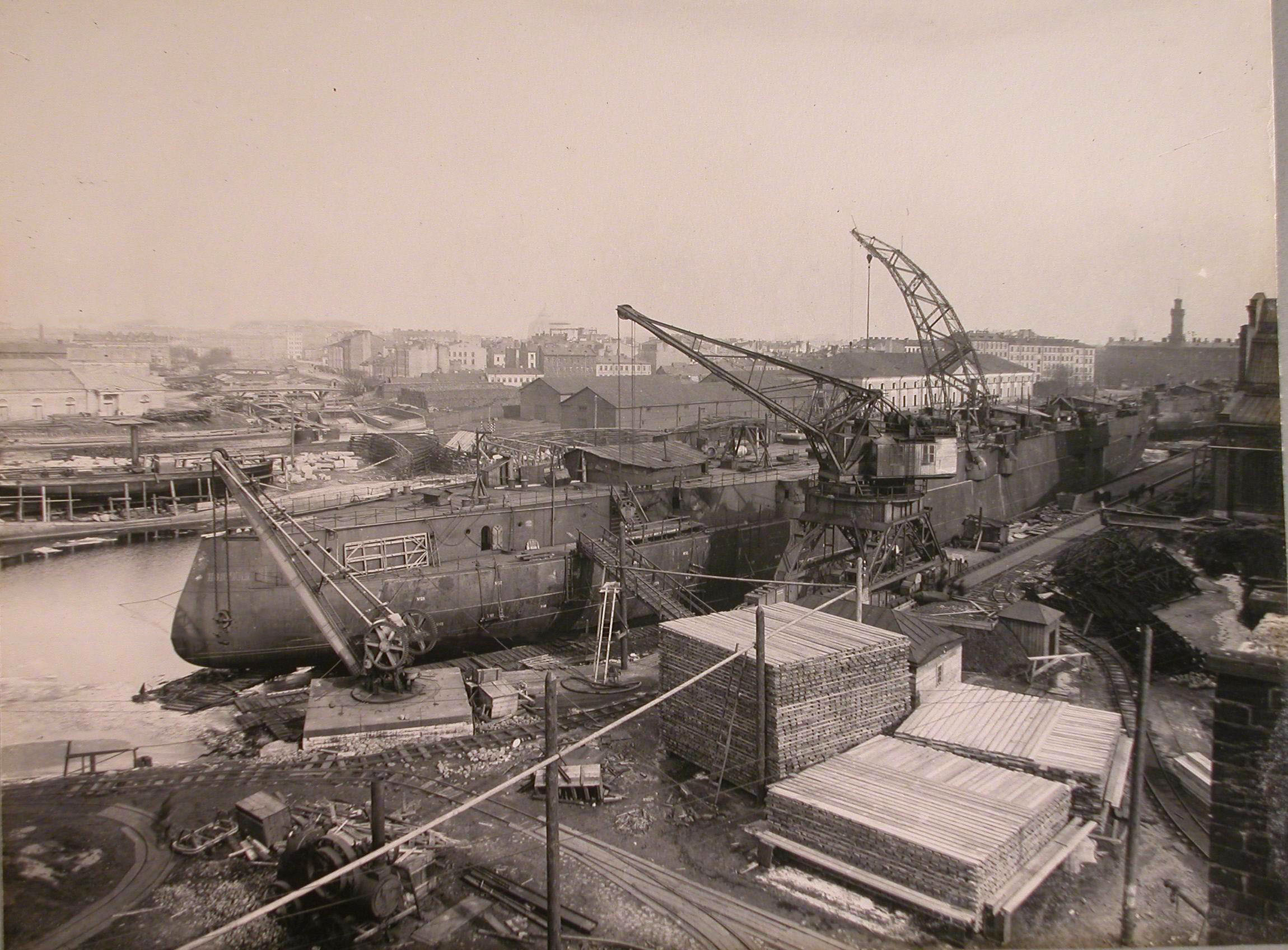
Outfitting of Russian battleship Poltava in Admiralty Shipyard, 1912

Fitting out, or outfitting, is the process in shipbuilding that follows the float-out/launching of a vessel and precedes sea trials. It is the period when all the remaining construction of the ship is completed and readied for delivery to her owners. Since most of the fitting-out process is interior work, this stage can overlap with latter stages, such as the sea trials.

== Launching or floating ==
After a vessel has been floated (in contemporary shipbuilding) or launched (in traditional shipbuilding), it is then towed out of its drydock and moored at a fitting-out berth. While still afloat, its construction is then continued. Depending on the type of vessel, fitting-out can last weeks or many months. Vessels with comparatively little space for human occupation, such as oil tankers, bulk carriers and container ships, can take the least time for fitting. Conversely, passenger ships take the longest. The process can include:

- completion of the superstructure,
- installation of the ship’s power plant, engines, and other machinery,
- interior equipment and systems, including electrical, plumbing, and HVAC,
- finishing of interior spaces,
- and installation of furnishings.

Whatever construction is completed during fitting is also dependent on the shipyard’s capabilities and the availability of equipment prior to floating. For example, Queen Mary 2 was originally to have its propeller pods installed prior to floating, but this was not done until the fitting-out stage.

Contemporary ship construction usually has the vessel returning to drydock several times for installation of propulsion mechanisms (such as propulsion pods in contemporary vessels) and for the painting of surfaces below the waterline.
