= Gangut-class battleship =

Russian dreadnought class

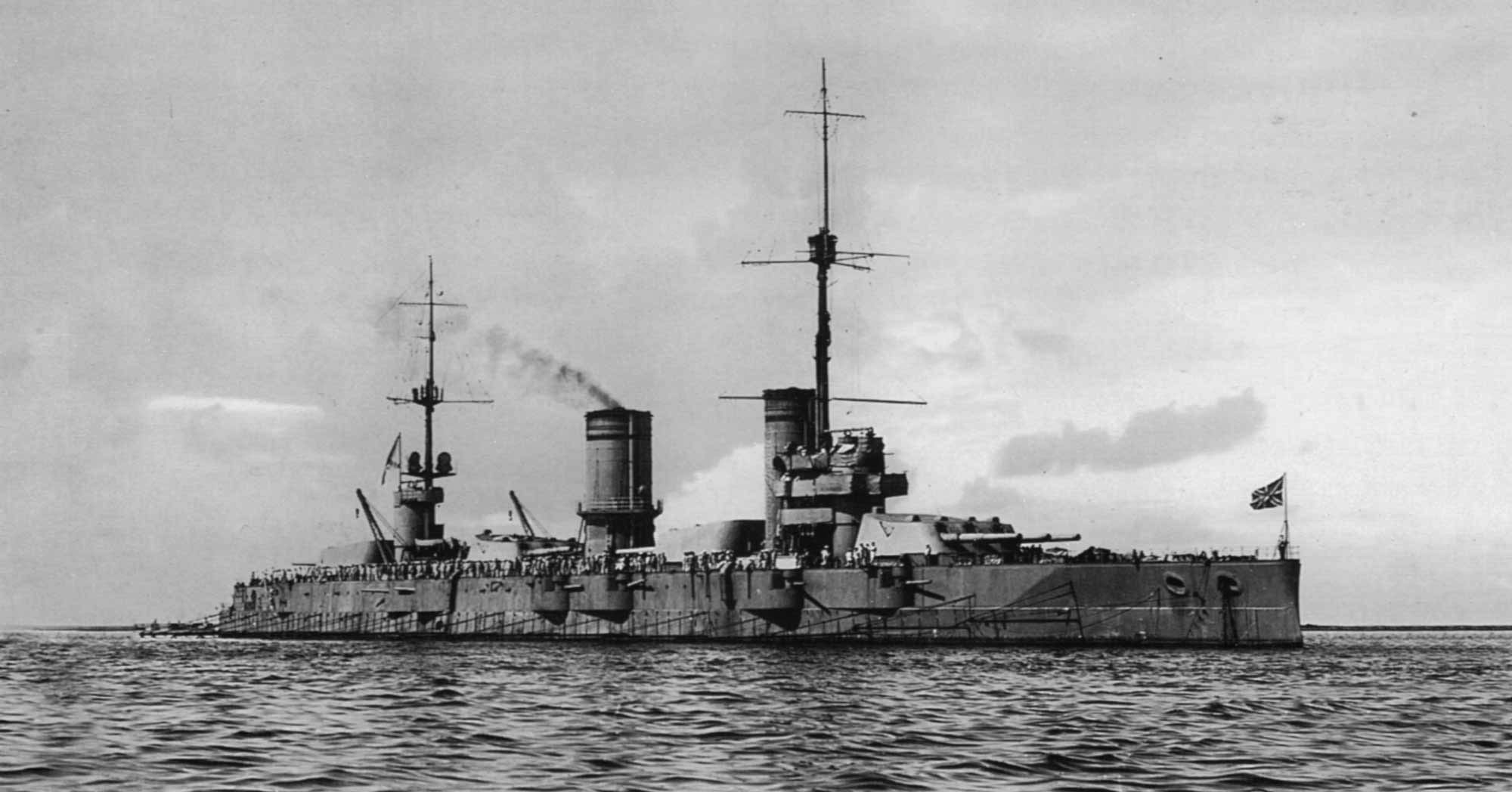
- Gangut during World War I

Class overview
- Builders: Admiralty Shipyard; Baltic Works
- Operators: Imperial Russian Navy; Soviet Navy
- Preceded by: Andrei Pervozvanny class
- Succeeded by: Imperatritsa Mariya class
- Built: 1909–1914
- In commission: 1914–1956
- Planned: 4
- Completed: 4
- Scrapped: 4

General characteristics
- Type: Dreadnought battleship
- Displacement: 24,800 t (24,400 long tons)
- Length: 181.2 m (594 ft 6 in)
- Beam: 26.9 m (88 ft 3 in)
- Draft: 8.99 m (29 ft 6 in)
- Installed power: 25 Yarrow boilers; 52,000 shp (39,000 kW) (on trials)
- Propulsion: 4 shafts, 4 steam turbines
- Speed: 24.1 knots (44.6 km/h; 27.7 mph) (on trials)
- Range: 3,200 nmi (5,900 km; 3,700 mi) at 10 knots (19 km/h; 12 mph)
- Complement: 1,149
- Armament: 4 × triple 12 in (305 mm) guns; 16 × single 4.7 in (120 mm) guns; 1 × single 3 in (76 mm) AA gun; 4 × 17.7 in (450 mm) torpedo tubes
- Armor: Waterline belt: 125–225 mm (4.9–8.9 in); Deck: 12–50 mm (0.5–2.0 in); Turrets: 76–203 mm (3.0–8.0 in); Barbettes: 75–150 mm (3.0–5.9 in); Conning tower: 100–254 mm (3.9–10.0 in)

The Gangut class, also known as the Sevastopol class, were the first dreadnoughts built for the Imperial Russian Navy before World War I. They had a convoluted design history involving several British companies, evolving requirements, an international design competition, and foreign protests. Four ships were ordered in 1909, Gangut, Poltava, Petropavlovsk, and Sevastopol. Construction was delayed by financing problems until the Duma formally authorized the ships in 1911. They were delivered from December 1914 through January 1915, although they still needed work on the gun turrets and fire-control systems until mid-1915. Their role was to defend the mouth of the Gulf of Finland against the Germans, who never tried to enter, so the ships spent their time training and providing cover for minelaying operations. Their crews participated in the general mutiny of the Baltic Fleet after the February Revolution in 1917, and joined the Bolsheviks the following year.

All of the dreadnoughts except for Petropavlovsk were laid up in late 1918 for lack of manpower and Poltava was severely damaged by a fire while laid up. Petropavlovsk was retained in commission to defend Kronstadt and Leningrad against the British forces supporting the White Russians although she also helped to suppress a mutiny by the garrison of Fort Krasnaya Gorka in 1919. Her crew, and that of Sevastopol, joined the Kronstadt rebellion of March 1921. After the revolt was violently quashed, the two ships were given 'revolutionary' names, with Petropavlovsk being renamed Marat and Sevastopol renamed to Parizhskaya Kommuna. The other two serviceable vessels were recommissioned and renamed in 1925–1926. Gangut was renamed Oktyabrskaya Revolyutsiya and Poltava was renamed Frunze. Parizhskaya Kommuna was modified in 1928 to improve her sea-keeping abilities so that she could be transferred to the Black Sea Fleet. This proved to be the first of a series of modernizations where each ship of the class was progressively reconstructed and improved, with the exception of Frunze. A number of proposals were made in the 1930s to rebuild Frunze, but these came to naught and she was hulked preparatory to scrapping.

The two ships of the Baltic Fleet did not play a prominent role in the Winter War, but did have their anti-aircraft guns significantly increased before Operation Barbarossa in 1941. Marat had her bow blown off and Oktyabrskaya Revolyutsiya was badly damaged by multiple bomb hits in September. The former was sunk, but later raised and became a floating battery for the duration of the Siege of Leningrad while the latter spent over a year under repair. Both ships bombarded German troops so long as they remained within reach, but Oktyabrskaya Revolyutsiya did not venture away from Kronstadt for the duration of the war. Parizhskaya Kommuna remained in Sevastopol until forced to evacuate by advancing German troops. She made one trip to besieged Sevastopol in December 1941 and made a number of bombardments in support of the Kerch Offensive during January–March 1942. She was withdrawn from combat in April as German aerial supremacy had made it too dangerous to risk such a large target.

Parizhskaya Kommuna and Oktyabrskaya Revolyutsiya remained on the active list after the end of the war although little is known of their activities. Both were reclassified as 'school battleships' (uchebnyi lineinyi korabl) in 1954 and stricken in 1956 after which they were slowly scrapped. There were several plans to reconstruct Petropavlovsk using the bow of Frunze, but they were not accepted and were formally cancelled on 29 June 1948. She was renamed Volkhov in 1950 and served as a stationary training ship until stricken in 1953 and subsequently broken up. Frunze was finally scrapped beginning in 1949.

== Design and development ==
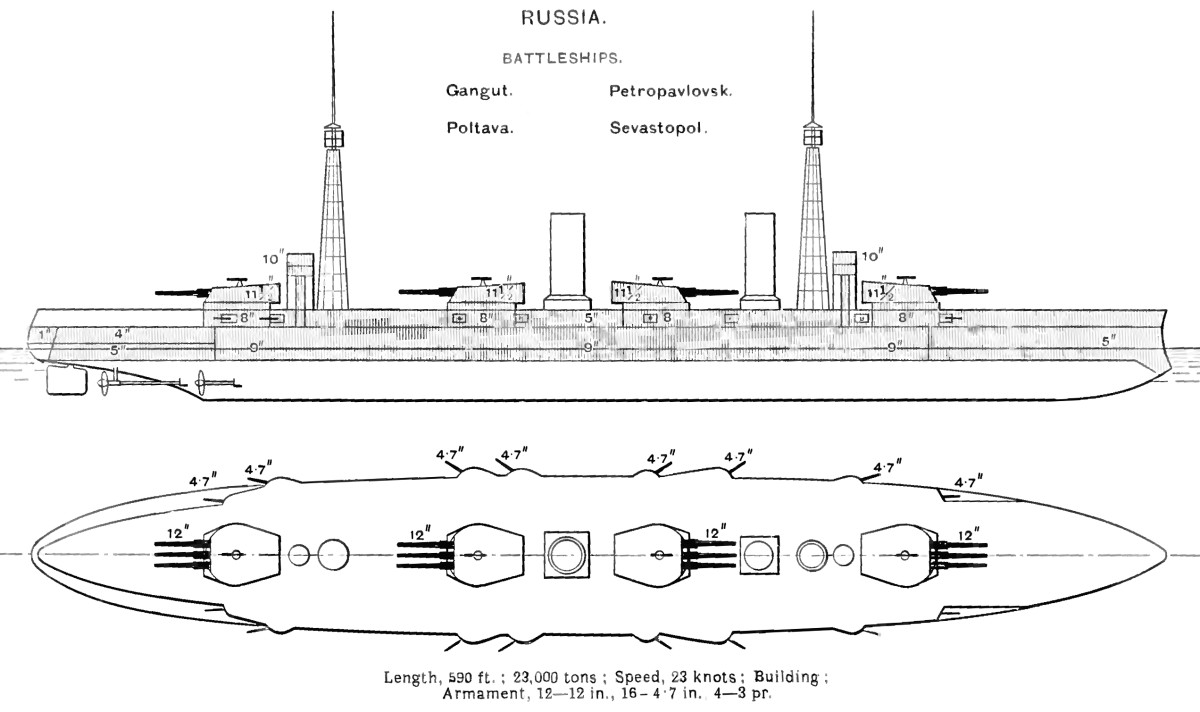
Right elevation and deck plan as depicted in Brassey's Naval Annual 1912

After the end of the Russo-Japanese War the Imperial Russian Navy was in a state of confusion. Its leadership, tactics and ship designs had all been cast into disrepute by its repeated defeats by the Japanese at the Battle of Tsushima, Battle off Ulsan and the Battle of the Yellow Sea. The Navy took quite some time to absorb the design lessons from the war while the government reformed the Naval Ministry and forced many of its more conservative officers to retire. It conducted a design contest for a dreadnought in 1906, but the Duma refused to authorize it, preferring to spend the money on rebuilding the Army.

The requirements for a new class of dreadnoughts were in a state of flux during 1907, but Vickers Ltd submitted a design that met the latest specifications and was very nearly accepted by the Navy for a 22,000-long-ton (22,000 t) ship with twelve 12-inch (305 mm) guns in triple superimposed turrets. However rumors of a contract with Vickers raised a public outcry as they had some problems with the armored cruiser Rurik then building in England. The Naval Ministry defused the situation on 30 December 1907 (Note: All dates used in this article are New Style) by announcing an international design contest with the ship built in Russia regardless of the nationality of the winning firm. By the deadline of 12 March 1908 a total of 51 designs had been submitted by 13 different shipyards. The winner of the competition was a design from the German firm of Blohm & Voss, but the French protested that they did not want to see any of the money that they had loaned Russia to build up its defenses in German pockets. The Russians bought the design for 250,000 rubles and shelved it to placate both sides. A design by the Baltic Works had been the runner-up and was revised for the Navy's updated requirements with a complete design to be presented by 22 March 1909. This was extended by a month to allow the Baltic Works to finalize its contract with the British firm of John Brown & Company for design assistance with the hull form and machinery.

The Naval General Staff believed that a speed advantage over the 21-knot (39 km/h; 24 mph) German battle fleet would prove very useful in battle, as demonstrated at the Battle of Tsushima, but use of the heavy and bulky Belleville Water-tube boilers, as insisted upon by the Engineering Section of the Naval Technical Committee, would prevent the new design from exceeding 21.25 knots itself. However, after John Brown indicated that the ship's turbines could deliver 45,000 shaft horsepower (33,556 kW) if supplied with enough steam and that the hull form could reach 23 knots (43 km/h; 26 mph) with that amount of power, the Naval General Staff took the opportunity to get the speed it desired by using small-tube boilers. It convened a meeting of the Naval Technical Committee to discuss the issue, but packed it with engineers from the fleet who were in favor of small-tube boilers and the Engineering Section was outvoted. The Yarrow small-tube boiler was significantly smaller and lighter than Belleville large-tube boiler, but required more frequent cleaning and repair and their horsepower dropped off more rapidly with use.

The Russians did not believe that superfiring turrets offered any advantage as they discounted the value of axial fire, believed that broadside fire was much more important and also believed that super firing turrets could not fire while over the lower turret because of muzzle blast interfering with the open sighting hoods in the lower turret's roof. They therefore designed the ships with a 'linear' arrangement (lineinoe raspolozhenie) of turrets distributed over the length of the ship. This arrangement had several advantages because it reduced the stress on the ends of the ship since the turrets were not concentrated at the end of the ship, increased stability because the lack of elevated turrets and their barbettes, improved the survivability of the ship because the magazines were separated from each other and gave a lower silhouette. Disadvantages were that the magazines had to be put in the middle of all the machinery, which required steam pipes to be run through or around them and the lack of deck space free from blast. This greatly complicated the placement of the anti-torpedo boat guns which ultimately had to be mounted in the hull, closer to the water than was desirable.

=== General characteristics ===
The Ganguts were 180 meters (590 ft) long at the waterline and 181.2 meters (594 ft 6 in) long overall. They had a beam of 26.9 meters (88 ft) and a draft of 8.99 meters (29 ft 6 in), 49 centimeters (1 ft 7 in) more than designed. They were overweight and their displacement was 24,800 metric tons (24,400 long tons) at load, over 1,500 t (1,500 long tons) more than their designed displacement of 23,288 metric tons (22,920 long tons). This reduced their freeboard by about 16 inches (41 cm) and gave them a slight bow trim that made them very wet ships.

High-tensile steel was used throughout the longitudinally framed hull with mild steel used only in areas that did not contribute to structural strength. This, plus refinements in the design process, meant that the hull was 19% lighter than that of the preceding Andrei Pervozvanny-class pre-dreadnoughts. The hull was subdivided by 13 transverse watertight bulkheads and had a double bottom. The engine and condenser rooms were divided by two longitudinal bulkheads. They had two electrically driven rudders on the centerline, the main rudder abaft the smaller auxiliary rudder. Their designed metacentric height was 1.76 meters (5.8 ft).

=== Propulsion ===
Two Parsons-type steam turbine sets drove the four propellers. The engine rooms were located between turrets three and four in three transverse compartments. The outer compartments each had a high-pressure ahead and reverse turbine for each wing propeller shaft. The central engine room had two each low-pressure ahead and astern turbines as well as two cruising turbines driving the two center shafts. The engines had a total designed output of 42,000 shaft horsepower (31,000 kW), but they produced 52,000 shp (39,000 kW) during Poltava's full-speed trials on 21 November 1915 and gave a top speed of 24.1 knots (44.6 km/h; 27.7 mph). Twenty-five Yarrow boilers provided steam to the engines at a designed working pressure of 17.5 atm (1,773 kPa; 257 psi). Each boiler was fitted with Thornycroft oil sprayers for mixed oil/coal burning. They were arranged in two groups. The forward group consisted of two boiler rooms in front of the second turret, the foremost of which had three boilers while the second one had six. The rear group was between the second and third turrets and comprised two compartments, each with eight boilers. At full load they carried 1,847.5 long tons (1,877.1 t) of coal and 700 long tons (710 t) of fuel oil and that provided them a range of 3,500 nautical miles (6,500 km; 4,000 mi) at a speed of 10 knots (19 km/h; 12 mph).

=== Armament ===
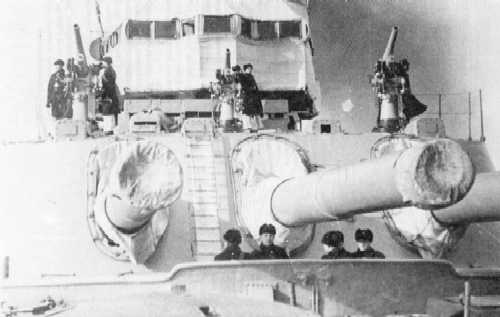
The forward triple turret of Petropavlovsk

The main armament consisted of a dozen 52-caliber Obukhovskii 12-inch (305 mm) Pattern 1907 guns mounted in four electrically powered triple-gun turrets. The guns could be depressed to −5° and elevated to 25°. They could be loaded at any angle between −5° and +15°; their rate of fire was one round every 30 to 40 seconds up to 15° of elevation and one round per minute above that. The forward turret had an arc of fire of 330°, the second turret had a total of 280°, the third turret 310° and the aft turret 300°. They could elevate at 3–4° per second and traverse at a rate of 3.2° per second. 100 rounds per gun were carried at full load. The guns fired 470.9-kilogram (1,038 lb) projectiles at a muzzle velocity of 762 m/s (2,500 ft/s); this provided a maximum range of 23,230 meters (25,400 yd).

Sixteen manually operated 50-caliber 4.7-inch (120 mm) Pattern 1905 guns were mounted in the hull in casemates as the secondary battery intended to defend the ship against torpedo boats. Because of the lack of freeboard and a bow-heavy trim the forward casemates were often washed out in even moderate seas. All guns had a firing arc of 125°–30° and at least four could bear on any part of the horizon. Their maximum elevation was +25° and they could elevate at 3.5° per second. They could traverse at six to eight degrees per second. 300 rounds per gun were provided which was increased from 245 rounds during construction. As designed they were 15 feet (4.6 m) above the waterline, but this was reduced in service as the ships were overweight. The guns had a rate of fire of seven rounds per minute and a maximum range of about 16,800 yards (15,362 m) at 25° elevation with a 63.87-pound (28.97 kg) semi-armor-piercing Model 1911 shell at a muzzle velocity of 792.5 m/s (2,600 ft/s).

The Gangut-class ships were completed with only a single 30-caliber 3-inch (76 mm) Lender anti-aircraft (AA) gun mounted on the quarterdeck. This had a maximum depression of -5° and a maximum elevation of +65°. It fired a 14.33-pound (6.50 kg) shell at a muzzle velocity of 1,929 ft/s (588 m/s). It had a rate of fire of 10–12 rounds per minute and had a maximum ceiling of 19,000 ft (5,800 m). Other AA guns were probably added during the course of World War I, but details are lacking, although Conway's says that four 75-millimeter (3.0 in) guns were added to the roofs of the end turrets during the war. Four 17.7-inch (450 mm) submerged torpedo tubes were fitted with three torpedoes for each tube.

=== Fire control ===
Two Zeiss 5-meter (16 ft 5 in) rangefinders were fitted on the conning towers and there was also a 4.5-foot (1.4 m) Barr & Stroud instrument, possibly for precise stationkeeping on the master ship when concentrating fire. Two Krylov stadimeters were situated in the lower level of the forward conning tower. These would provide data for the central artillery post to calculate with its imported Pollen Argo Mark V Clock, a mechanical fire-control computer, and then transmit the gun commands via the Geisler transmission system for the gun crew to follow. During the winter of 1915–1916 the Zeiss rangefinders were transferred to armored hoods on the rear of the fore and aft turrets and, at some point, 18-foot (5.5 m) Barr & Stroud rangefinders were added to the roofs of the middle turrets. Gangut received a 9-foot (2.7 m) Pollen rangefinder in the spring of 1916.

=== Protection ===
The armor protection of the Gangut-class ships had to protect against two different threats as revealed during the Russo-Japanese War. Japanese high explosive shells had riddled the unarmored portions of Russian ships and had even sunk several ships with their heavy armor belts unpenetrated. The Russians decided that the entire side of the ship needed to be armored, even though this would limit the thickness of the main belt. They developed a system where the outer armor would break up or at least slow shells down and burst immediately behind the outer armor and an inboard armor bulkhead would stop the splinters and shell fragments from reaching the vitals. This system likely would have worked against the British armor-piercing shells that performed so badly at the Battle of Jutland, but would have failed against the improved shells introduced afterwards with their redesigned fuses. A related weakness was that the turrets and conning towers lacked the inboard splinter bulkhead even though they used armor thickness roughly equivalent to that of the main belt.

The waterline belt, made of Krupp cemented armor (KCA), had a maximum thickness of 225 millimeters (8.9 in), but tapered to about 150 mm (5.9 in) on its bottom edge. It was 117.2 meters (385 ft) long and had a total height of 5 meters (16 ft), 3.26 meters (10 ft 8 in) of which was above the design waterline and 1.74 meters (5 ft 9 in) below. However, the ship's draft was almost 50 to 79 centimeters (20 to 31 in) deeper than intended, which meant that much less was above water. The remaining portion of the waterline was protected by 125-millimeter (4.9 in) plates. The upper belt, which protected the casemates, was 125 mm of KCA over the citadel and 2.72 meters (8 ft 11 in) high. It thinned to a thickness of 75 millimeters forward of the citadel. The area aft of the citadel was the only unprotected section of the hull. 3.4 meters (11 ft) inboard of the side was a longitudinal splinter bulkhead made of Krupp non-cemented armor (KNC). It was 50 mm (2.0 in) thick at the level of the main belt, but thinned to 37.55 mm (1.478 in) behind the upper belt. The main deck sloped from the bulkhead to the lower edge of the waterline belt and consisted of a 50-millimeter KNC plate on a 12 mm (0.47 in) mild steel plate. This space was used as a coal bunker, which added extra protection. The main belt was closed off by 100 mm (3.9 in) transverse bulkheads fore and aft and the steering gear was protected by armor 100–125 mm thick.

The main gun turrets had a KCA face and sides 203 mm (8.0 in) thick with a 100 mm roof. The guns had 3-inch gun shields to protect against splinters entering the embrasures and they were separated by splinter bulkheads. The barbettes were 150 mm thick above the upper deck, but reduced to 75 mm behind other armor, except for the fore and aft barbettes which only thinned to 125 mm. The conning tower sides were 254 mm (10.0 in) thick with a 100 mm roof. The 120 mm guns had their own individual 3-inch gun shields. The funnel uptakes were protected by 22 mm (0.87 in) of armor. The upper deck was 37.5 mm (1.48 in) of nickel-chrome steel and the middle deck was 25 mm (0.98 in) of nickel-chrome steel between the longitudinal splinter bulkheads, but thinned to 19 mm (0.75 in) outside them. The lower deck was of 12 mm (0.47 in) mild steel.

Underwater protection was minimal as there was only a single watertight bulkhead, presumably of high-tensile steel, behind the upwards extension of the double bottom. This was an extension of the splinter bulkhead and was also 3.4 meters inboard. A more comprehensive system was considered early in the design process but rejected because it would have cost some 500–600 t (490–590 long tons; 550–660 short tons).

The armor scheme of the Gangut-class ships had some significant weaknesses. The rear transverse bulkhead was unprotected by any other armor but was the same thickness as the forward bulkhead which was defended by the upper belt armor. The thinness of the barbette armor was a serious defect which could have proved fatal in a battle. And the lack of a splinter bulkhead behind the armor of the turrets, barbettes and conning towers left all of those locations vulnerable to main gun hits. But the biggest weakness was the lack of an anti-torpedo bulkhead, which made the ships highly vulnerable to mines or torpedoes.

== Ships ==
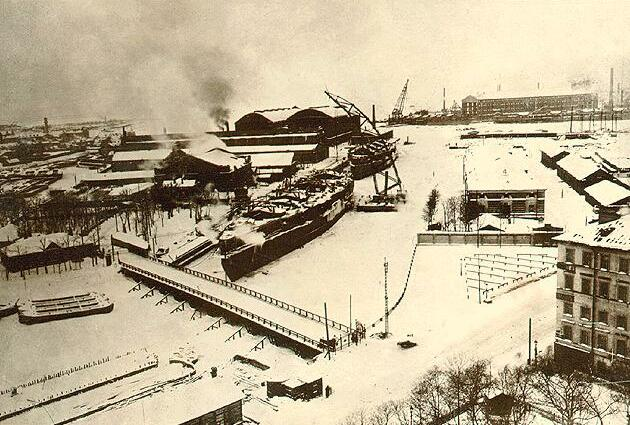
Gangut and Poltava fitting out during the winter of 1911–1912

All four ships were laid down on 16 June 1909, but this was just a ceremonial event as actual work did not begin until September–October. One major complication was that the design for the turrets and their magazines was not completed when construction began so their weights and dimensions had to be estimated. The machinery for these ships was built by either the Baltic Works or the Franco-Russian Works as the New Admiralty Shipyard lacked its own engine shop. Construction was initially very slow because the Duma did not allocate any money for these ships until May 1911. Initial funding was taken from other budget items or the emperor's discretionary fund and the shipyards had to use their own money to keep the work going. They were enormously expensive with their cost estimated at 29.4 million rubles each, including armament. By way of comparison the preceding class of pre-dreadnoughts had only cost 11 million rubles each. Once the Duma provided the funding the pace of work accelerated and the ships were launched later that year, although delays in the delivery of engines and turrets hindered their completion. All of the ships completed abbreviated trials by the end of 1914 and reached the fleet in December 1914 – January 1915.

Construction data
Ship	Russian name	Builder	Namesake	Renamed	Second Namesake	Laid down	Launched	Commissioned
Gangut	Гангут	Admiralty Shipyard, Saint Petersburg	Battle of Gangut, 1714	Oktyabrskaya Revolyutsiya (Октябрьская революция) 27 Jun 1925	October Revolution, 1917	16 Jun 1909	20 Oct 1911	11 Jan 1915
Petropavlovsk	Петропавловск	Baltic Yard, Saint Petersburg	Siege of Petropavlovsk, 1854	Marat (Марат) 31 Mar 1921	Jean-Paul Marat	16 Jun 1909	22 Sep 1911	5 Jan 1915
Sevastopol	Севастополь	Baltic Yard, Saint Petersburg	Siege of Sevastopol	Parizhskaya Kommuna (Парижская коммуна) 31 Mar 1921	Paris Commune, 1871	16 Jun 1909	10 Jul 1911	30 Nov 1914
Poltava	Полтава	Admiralty Shipyard, Saint Petersburg	Battle of Poltava, 1709	Frunze (Фру́нзе) 7 Jan 1926	Mikhail Frunze	16 Jun 1909	23 Jul 1911	30 Dec 1914

== Service ==
=== World War I ===
All four of the Ganguts were assigned to the First Battleship Brigade of the Baltic Fleet in December 1914 – January 1915 when they reached Helsingfors. Their turrets and fire-control systems, however, were still being adjusted and fine-tuned through the next spring. Their role was to defend the mouth of the Gulf of Finland against the Germans, who never tried to enter, so they spent their time training with occasional sorties into the Baltic. Several ships ran aground in 1915 and 1916, often while providing cover for minelaying operations, but only Sevastopol suffered any significant damage. A minor mutiny broke out on 1 November on board Gangut when the executive officer refused to feed the crew the traditional meal of meat and macaroni after coaling. The crews of the battleships joined the general mutiny of the Baltic Fleet on 16 March 1917, after the idle sailors received word of the February Revolution in Saint Petersburg. The Treaty of Brest-Litovsk required the Soviets to evacuate their base at Helsinki in March 1918 or have them interned by newly independent Finland even though the Gulf of Finland was still frozen over. Gangut and her sisters led the first group of ships on 12 March and reached Kronstadt five days later in what became known as the 'Ice Voyage'.

=== Russian Civil War and interwar period ===
All of the dreadnoughts except for Petropavlovsk were laid up in October–November 1918 for lack of manpower. She bombarded the rebellious garrison of Fort Krasnaya Gorka in 1919 and supported Bolshevik light forces operating against British ships supporting the White Russians in the Gulf of Finland. On 17 August 1919 Petropavlovsk was claimed as torpedoed and put out of action by the British Coastal Motor Boat CMB 88 in Kronstadt harbor, but was, in fact, not damaged at all. On 24 November 1919 a fire broke out in Poltava's forward boiler room and gutted much of her interior; she was never repaired although numerous proposals were made to reconstruct her. The crews of Sevastopol and Petropavlovsk joined the Kronstadt rebellion of 1921 and they were renamed Parizhskaya Kommuna and Marat respectively after the rebellion was crushed to commemorate the Paris Commune and to erase their 'betrayal' of the Communist Party. The two undamaged ships were recommissioned in 1925–1926 and all the ships were given proper revolutionary names.

The initial attempts to return Frunze to service were to restore her to the original design, but money ran out before she was even half completed. Subsequent plans that focused on reconstructing her as a modernized equivalent to her sisters or even as a battlecruiser, with one turret deleted to save weight, were considered, but finally abandoned on 23 January 1935 when all work was stopped.

Parizhskaya Kommuna was refitted in 1928 in preparation for her transfer to the Black Sea Fleet the next year and she was given an open-topped false bow to improve her sea-keeping ability. However, while en route through the Bay of Biscay, she was caught in a heavy storm that damaged the bow and she was forced to put into Brest for repairs. Marat was the first of the class to be reconstructed between 1928 and 8 April 1931. Her superstructure was enlarged, her guns were replaced, the turrets overhauled, the anti-aircraft armament augmented and the fire-control equipment modernized. Her boilers were converted to burn only fuel oil and this produced enough steam that the forward three boilers could be removed and the boiler room was turned into anti-aircraft magazines and control spaces. The forward funnel was angled to the rear and extended to try to keep the exhaust out of the gunnery spaces and the bridge. She was also given a false bow, but hers had a solid top that turned it into a forecastle. Oktyabrskaya Revolyutsiya was the next ship to be rebuilt and profited from the experiences of her sister's modernization between 1931 and 1934. All twenty-five of her old boilers were replaced by a dozen oil-fired boilers originally intended for the Borodino-class battlecruiser Izmail. The space saved was used to add another inboard longitudinal watertight bulkhead that greatly improved her underwater protection. The rest of her modernization was along the same lines as Marat's, except that the latter's tubular foremast was replaced by a sturdier semi-conical mast, a new aft structure was built in front of the rear conning tower which caused the mainmast to be moved forward, her forward funnel was curved to the rear to better keep the bridge clear of exhaust gases and the thickness of her turret roofs was increased to 152 millimeters (6.0 in). Parizhskaya Kommuna began her two-stage reconstruction in 1933 along the lines of Oktyabrskaya Revolyutsiya's modernization. Major differences were that her guns and turrets were improved to increase their rate of fire to about two rounds per minute and to extend their range, she was the first ship of the class to receive light anti-aircraft guns and her forward funnel was given a more sinuous curve to direct its exhaust gases away from the forward superstructure. She completed these alterations in 1938, but was returned to the dockyard from December 1939 through July 1940 to receive a new armored deck and anti-torpedo bulges which cured her stability problems and greatly increased her underwater protection at a modest cost in speed.

=== World War II ===
==== Baltic Fleet ====
The participation of Marat and Oktyabrskaya Revolyutsiya in the Winter War was limited to a bombardment of Finnish coastal artillery in December 1939 at Saarenpää in the Beryozovye Islands before the Gulf of Finland iced over. They failed to inflict any permanent damage before being driven off by near misses. Both ships had their anti-aircraft armament modernized and reinforced over the winter of 1939–40 and were transferred to Tallinn shortly after the Soviets occupied Estonia in 1940. Oktyabrskaya Revolyutsiya received more AA guns in February–March 1941. Parizhskaya Kommuna received a more modest number of AA guns while she was receiving her bulges, but landed four 120-mm guns right before the Germans invaded.

On 22 June 1941, the Germans attacked the Soviet Union under the codename of Operation Barbarossa; on that date Marat was in Kronstadt and Oktyabrskaya Revolyutsiya was in Tallinn. The latter was soon forced to fall back to Kronstadt by the speed of the German advance and neither of the Baltic Fleet dreadnoughts participated in combat until 8 September when they fired on troops of the German 18th Army from positions near Kronstadt and Leningrad. Marat was lightly damaged by German 15-centimeter (5.9 in) guns on 16 September and had her bow blown off on 23 September by two bomb hits, one of which was claimed by Lieutenant Hans-Ulrich Rudel of III./StG 2 flying a Junkers Ju 87B 'Stuka', that detonated her forward magazine. She sank in the shallow water from progressive flooding, but was raised and used as a floating artillery battery for the rest of the war using two, and later, three of her gun turrets. Marat reverted to her original name on 31 May 1943. Oktyabrskaya Revolyutsiya was badly damaged on 21 September 1941 by three bomb hits on her bow that knocked out two of her turrets. She was sent for repairs at the Ordzhonikidze Yard on 23 October, although she was hit by more bombs on two different occasions while under repair until November 1942. Her AA armament was further reinforced during this period and Oktyabrskaya Revolyutsiya returned to her mission of providing fire support during the Siege of Leningrad, the Leningrad–Novgorod Offensive in January 1944 and the Vyborg–Petrozavodsk Offensive in June 1944. She was the last Soviet battleship to fire shots in anger on 9 June 1944 during the latter offensive. On 22 July 1944, the ship was awarded the Order of the Red Banner. Oktyabrskaya Revolyutsiya received a Lend-Lease British Type 279 air-warning radar sometime during 1944.

During the late 1930s Frunze was used as a barracks hulk while she was stripped for parts, until she was formally discarded 1 December 1940, after scrapping had already begun at a leisurely pace. After the German invasion she was towed to Kronstadt and run aground in late July 1941 near the Leningrad Sea Canal. During the Siege of Leningrad her hull was used as a base for small ships. Frunze raised on 31 May 1944, towed to Leningrad and scrapped beginning in 1949.

==== Black Sea Fleet ====
Parizhskaya Kommuna was in Sevastopol and remained until 30 October 1941 when she was evacuated to Novorossiysk after the Germans had breached Soviet defensive lines near the Perekop Isthmus. The ship fired her first shots of the war on 28–29 November when she bombarded German and Romanian troops south of Sevastopol. Parizhskaya Kommuna made one evacuation run to Sevastopol on 29 December, bombarding German troops on her arrival, but spent most of her time supporting troops during the Kerch Offensive in January–March 1942. She fired her last shots of the war at targets near Feodosiya during the nights of 20–22 March 1942 before returning to Poti to have her worn-out 12-inch guns relined. By the time this was finished the Soviets were unwilling to expose such a prominent ship to German air attacks, which had already sunk a number of cruisers and destroyers. She returned to her original name on 31 May 1943, but remained in Poti until late 1944 when she led the surviving major units of the Black Sea Fleet back to Sevastopol on 5 November. British Type 290 and Type 291 air-warning radars were fitted during the war. Sevastopol was awarded the Order of the Red Banner on 8 July 1945.

=== Postwar ===
Sevastopol and Oktyabrskaya Revolyutsiya remained on the active list after the end of the war although little is known of their activities. Both were reclassified as 'school battleships' (uchebnyi lineinyi korabl) on 24 July 1954 and stricken on 17 February 1956. Their scrapping began that same year although Oktyabrskaya Revolyutsiya's hulk was still in existence in May 1958.

After the war there were several plans, known as Project 27, to reconstruct Petropavlovsk (ex-Marat), using the bow of Frunze and moving her third turret to replace the first, but they were not accepted and were formally cancelled on 29 June 1948. She was renamed Volkhov, after the nearby river, on 28 November 1950 and served as a stationary training ship until stricken on 4 September 1953 and broken up afterwards.

After World War II two of Frunze's turrets and their guns were used to rebuild the destroyed Coastal Defense Battery 30 (Maxim Gorky I) in Sevastopol. It remained in service with the Soviet Navy and the Russian Navy until 1997.

== See also ==
- Vladimir Yourkevitch

== Bibliography ==
- Budzbon, Przemysław (1985). "Russia". In Gray, Randal (ed.). Conway's All the World's Fighting Ships 1906–1921. Annapolis, Maryland: Naval Institute Press. pp. 291–325. ISBN 0-85177-245-5.
- Budzbon, Przemysław (1980). "Soviet Union". In Chesneau, Roger (ed.). Conway's All the World's Fighting Ships 1922–1946. Greenwich, UK: Conway Maritime Press. pp. 318–346. ISBN 0-85177-146-7.
- Budzbon, Przemysław; Radziemski, Jan & Twardowski, Marek (2022). Warships of the Soviet Fleets 1939–1945. Vol. I: Major Combatants. Annapolis, Maryland: Naval Institute Press. ISBN 978-1-68247-877-6.
- Friedman, Norman (2008). Naval Firepower: Battleship Guns and Gunnery in the Dreadnought Era. Annapolis, Maryland: Naval Institute Press. ISBN 978-1-59114-555-4.
- Friedman, Norman (2011). Naval Weapons of World War One: Guns, Torpedoes, Mines and ASW Weapons of All Nations: An Illustrated Directory. Barnsley, UK: Seaforth. ISBN 978-1-84832-100-7.
- McLaughlin, Stephen (2003). Russian & Soviet Battleships. Annapolis, Maryland: Naval Institute Press. ISBN 1-55750-481-4.
- Roberts, John (1997). Battlecruisers. Annapolis, Maryland: Naval Institute Press. ISBN 1-55750-068-1.
- Rohwer, Jürgen (2005). Chronology of the War at Sea 1939–1945: The Naval History of World War Two (Third Revised ed.). Annapolis, Maryland: Naval Institute Press. ISBN 1-59114-119-2.
- Vinogradov, Sergei E. (1998). "Battleship Development in Russia from 1905 to 1917". Warship International. XXXV (3): 267–290. ISSN 0043-0374.
- Vinogradov, Sergei E. (1999). "Battleship Development in Russia From 1905 to 1917, Chapter 2". Warship International. XXXVI (2): 118–141. ISSN 0043-0374.
- Wernet, Dieter & Wernet, Inge (1997). "Maksim Gor'kii I: A Recent Example of the Re-Use of Naval Turrets in Coast Defenses". Warship International. XXXIV (1). ISSN 0043-0374.
