= Russian battleship Poltava (1911) =

Imperial Russian Navy's Gangut-class battleship

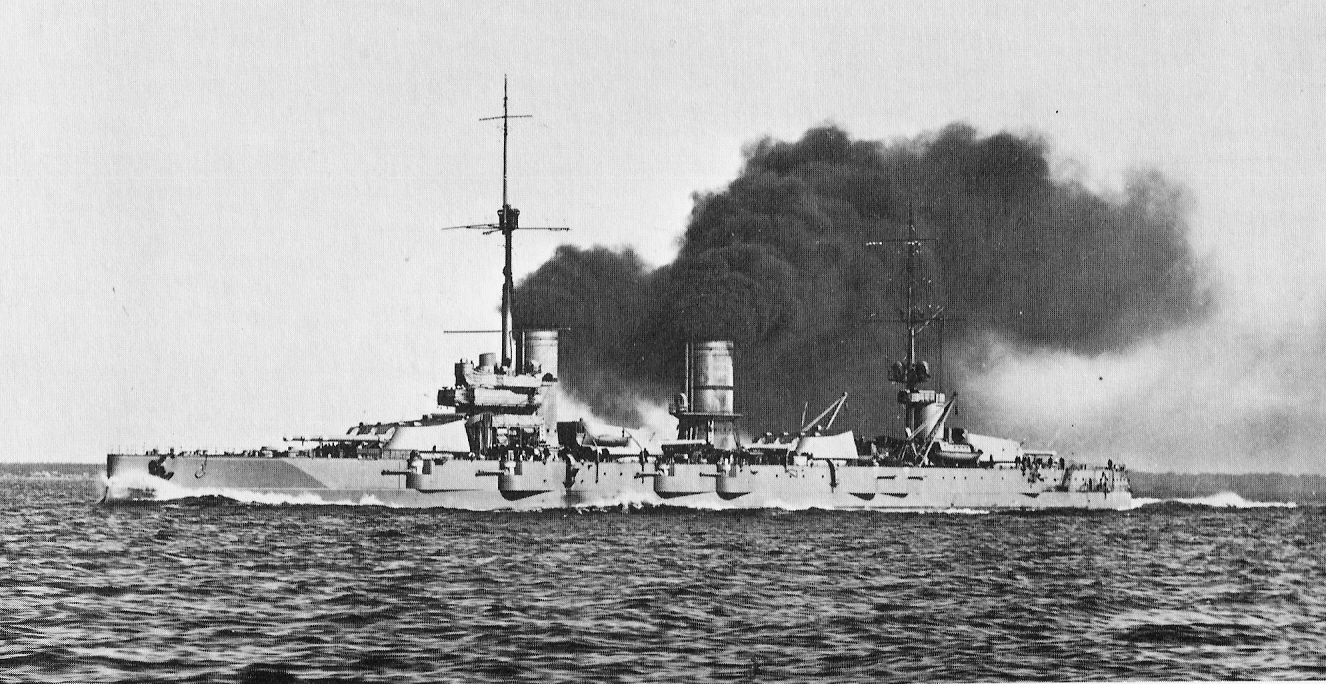

History

Russian Empire
- Name: Poltava
- Namesake: Battle of Poltava
- Operator: Imperial Russian Navy
- Builder: Admiralty Shipyard, Saint Petersburg
- Laid down: 16 June 1909 (Note: All dates used in this article are New Style)
- Launched: 23 July 1911
- In service: 30 December 1914

Soviet Union
- Name: Frunze
- Namesake: Mikhail Frunze
- Operator: Soviet Navy
- Acquired: 1917
- Decommissioned: October 1918
- Renamed: 7 January 1926
- Stricken: 1 December 1940
- Fate: Scrapped from 1949

General characteristics
- Class & type: Gangut-class battleship
- Displacement: 24,800 tonnes (24,400 long tons; 27,300 short tons)
- Length: 181.2 m (594 ft)
- Beam: 26.9 m (88 ft)
- Draft: 8.99 m (29.5 ft)
- Propulsion: 4-shaft Parsons steam turbines; 25 Yarrow boilers; 52,000 shp (38,776 kW) (on trials)
- Speed: 24.1 knots (44.6 km/h; 27.7 mph) (on trials)
- Range: 3,200 nautical miles (5,900 km) at 10 knots (19 km/h; 12 mph)
- Complement: 1,149
- Armament: 4 × triple 12 in (305 mm) guns; 16 × single 4.7 in (120 mm) guns; 1 × single 3 in (76 mm) AA gun; 4 × 17.7 in (450 mm) torpedo tubes
- Armor: Waterline belt: 125–225 mm (4.9–8.9 in); Deck: 12–50 mm (0.47–1.97 in); Turrets: 76–203 mm (3.0–8.0 in); Barbettes: 75–150 mm (3.0–5.9 in); Conning tower: 100–254 mm (3.9–10.0 in)

Poltava (Полтава) was the second of the Gangut-class battleships of the Imperial Russian Navy built before World War I. The Ganguts were the first class of Russian dreadnoughts. She was named after the Russian victory over Charles XII of Sweden in the Battle of Poltava in 1709.

She was completed during the winter of 1914–1915, but was not ready for combat until mid-1915. Her role was to defend the mouth of the Gulf of Finland against the Germans, who never tried to enter, so she spent her time training and providing cover for mine laying operations. She was laid up in 1918 for lack of trained crew and suffered a devastating fire the following year that almost gutted her. Many proposals were made to reconstruct or modernize her in different ways for the next twenty years, but none were carried out. While all this was being discussed she served as a source of spare parts for her sister ships and was used as a barracks ship. She was finally struck from the Navy List in 1940 and scrapping began at a very leisurely rate. She was intentionally grounded in late 1941 to prevent her from being sunk in some inconvenient location by the Germans. She was refloated in 1944 and scrapped beginning in 1949.

== Design and description ==
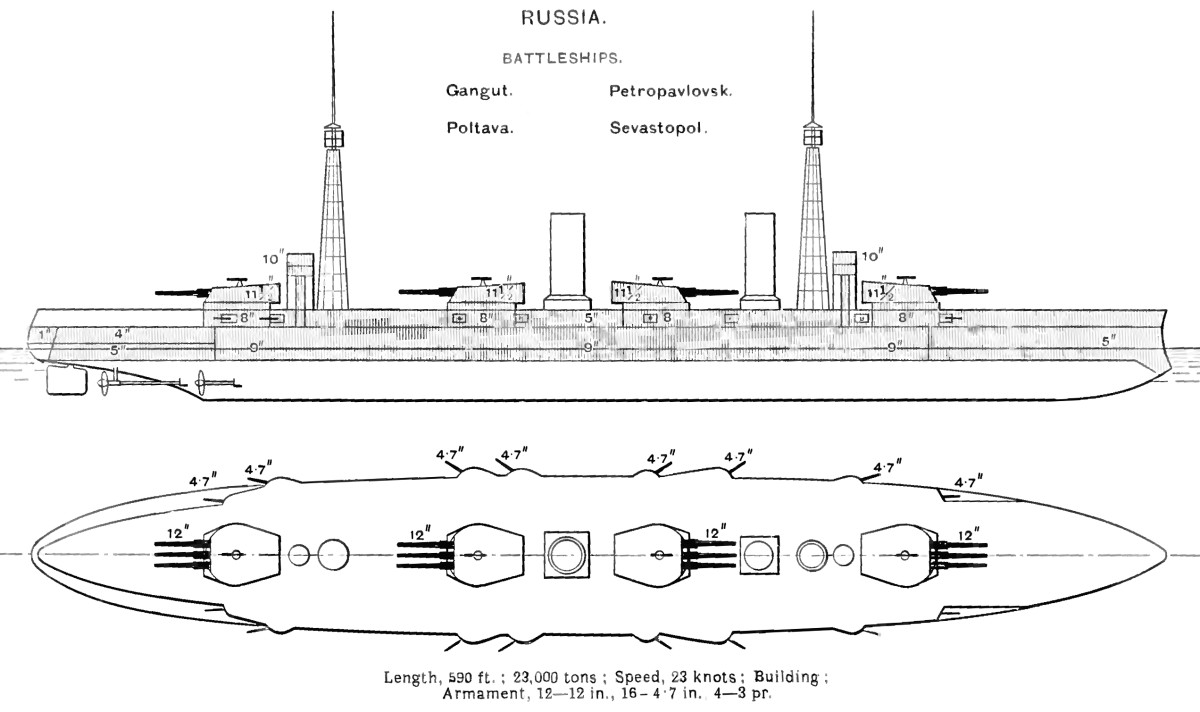
Plan view of the Gangut class

Poltava was 180 meters (590 ft) long at the waterline and 181.2 meters (594 ft) long overall. She had a beam of 26.9 meters (88 ft) and a draft of 8.99 meters (29.5 ft), 49 centimeters (1.61 ft) more than designed. Her displacement was 24,800 tonnes (24,400 long tons; 27,300 short tons) at load, over 1,500 t (1,500 long tons; 1,700 short tons) more than her designed displacement of 23,288 t (22,920 long tons; 25,671 short tons).

Poltava's machinery was built by the Franco-Russian Works. Ten Parsons steam turbines drove the four propellers. The engine rooms were located between turrets three and four in three transverse compartments. The outer compartments each had a high-pressure ahead and reverse turbine for each wing propeller shaft. The central engine room had two each low-pressure ahead and astern turbines as well as two cruising turbines driving the two center shafts. The engines had a total designed output of 42,000 shaft horsepower (31,319 kW), but they produced 52,000 shp (38,776 kW) during Poltava's full-speed trials on 21 November 1915 and gave a top speed of 24.1 knots (44.6 km/h; 27.7 mph). Twenty-five Yarrow boilers provided steam to the engines at a designed working pressure of 17.5 standard atmospheres (1,770 kPa; 257 psi). Each boiler was fitted with Thornycroft oil sprayers for mixed oil/coal burning. They were arranged in two groups. The forward group consisted of two boiler rooms in front of the second turret, the foremost of which had three boilers while the second one had six. The rear group was between the second and third turrets and comprised two compartments, each with eight boilers. At full load she carried 1,847.5 long tons (1,877.1 t) of coal and 700 long tons (710 t) of fuel oil and that provided her a range of 3,500 nautical miles (6,500 km) at a speed of 10 knots (19 km/h).

The main armament of the Ganguts consisted of a dozen 52-caliber Obukhovskii 12-inch (305 mm) Pattern 1907 guns mounted in four triple turrets distributed the length of the ship. The Russians did not believe that superfiring turrets offered any advantage, discounting the value of axial fire and believing that superfiring turrets could not fire while over the lower turret because of muzzle blast problems. They also believed that distributing the turrets, and their associated magazines, over the length of the ship improved the survivability of the ship. Sixteen 50-caliber 4.7-inch (119 mm) Pattern 1905 guns were mounted in casemates as the secondary battery intended to defend the ship against torpedo boats. The ships were completed with only a single 30-caliber 3-inch (76 mm) Lender anti-aircraft (AA) gun mounted on the quarterdeck. Other AA guns were probably added during the course of World War I, but details are lacking. Budzbon says that four 75-millimeter (3.0 in) were added to the roofs of the end turrets during the war. Four 17.7-inch (450 mm) submerged torpedo tubes were mounted with three torpedoes for each tube.

== Service ==
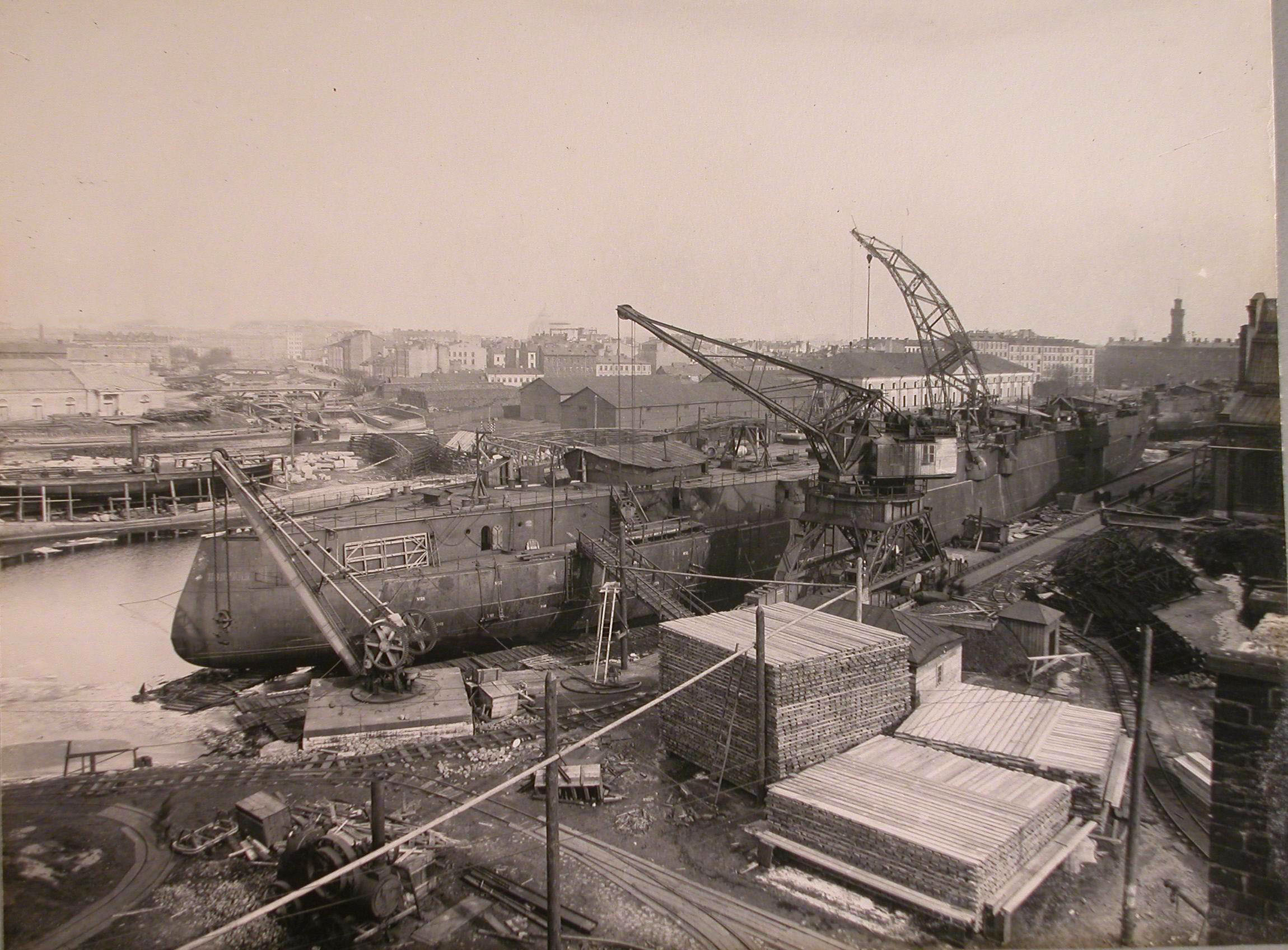
Outfitting of Poltava in the Admiralty Shipyard, 1912

Poltava was built by the Admiralty Shipyard at Saint Petersburg. She was laid down on 16 June 1909 and launched on 23 July 1911. At the end of October 1914 she was struck by her sister Gangut which jammed her kedge anchor, damaged her hull and delayed her trials to late November 1914. She entered service on 30 December 1914 when she reached Helsinki and was assigned to the First Battleship Brigade of the Baltic Fleet. However, gunnery and torpedo trials had to be postponed until mid-1915 because of the thick winter ice. She was the only ship of the class to perform a full-power speed trial, which she did in November 1915. She played a passive part in World War I as her role was to prevent the Germans from breaking into the Gulf of Finland, something the Germans never even tried. She ran aground in June 1916, but suffered little damage. Her crew participated in the February Revolution of 1917. She, and most of the Baltic Fleet, evacuated Helsingfors between 12 and 17 March 1918 despite the winter ice in the Gulf of Finland. Due to a shortage of crew she was placed into long-term conservation at Petrograd in October 1918.

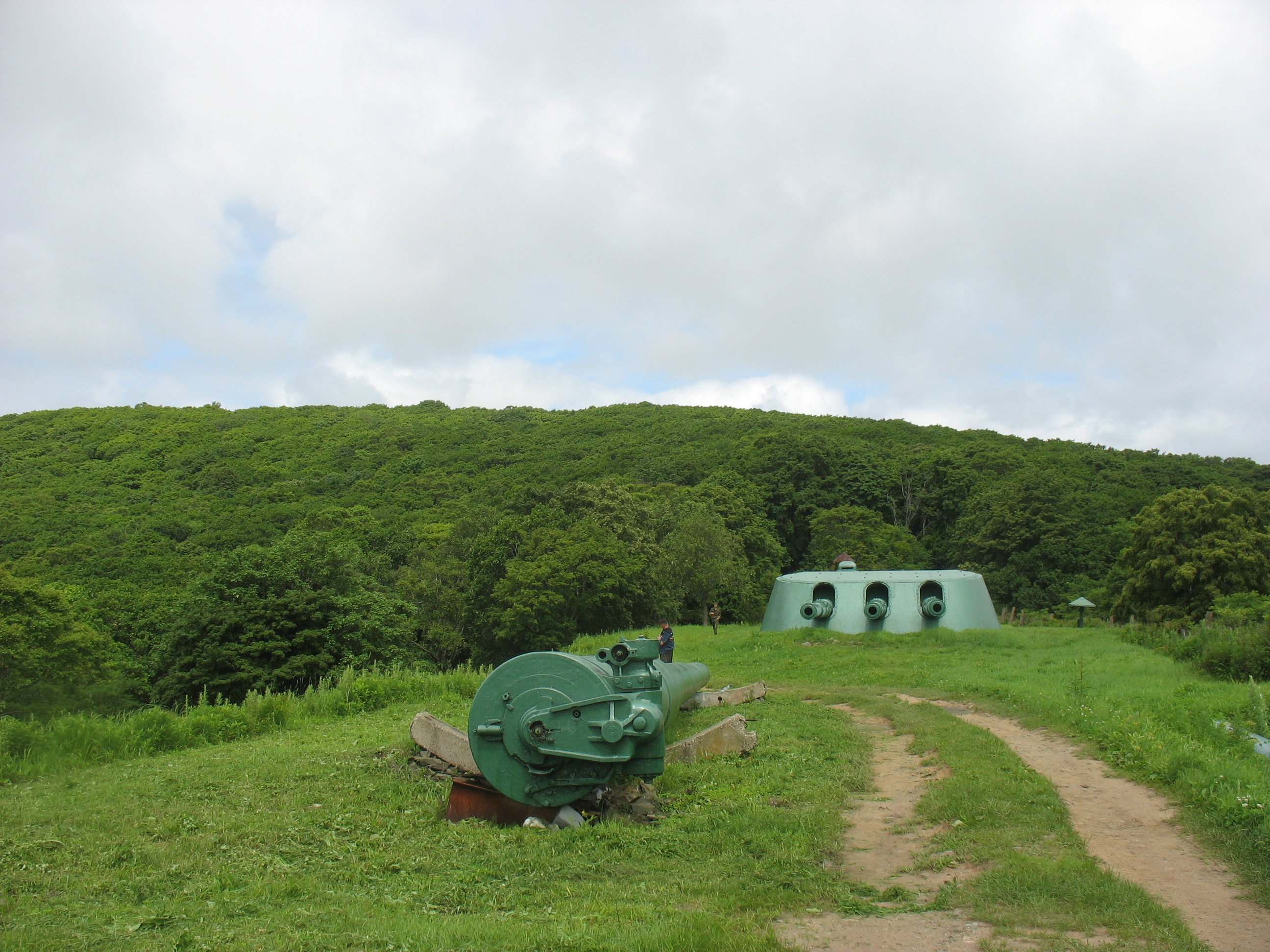
Poltava's turret as seen in Voroshilov Battery Museum, Russky Island, Vladivostok

On 24 November 1919 a fire broke out in her forward boiler room and gutted much of her interior. She was henceforth used as a source of spare parts for her sisters. Along with the Borodino-class battlecruiser Izmail she was considered for conversion to an aircraft carrier in 1924 for service in the Black Sea, but this proved to be too ambitious and expensive given the state of the Soviet economy shortly after the end of the Russian Civil War. A more modest goal was to restore her to her original configuration and the Baltic Works actually began work in 1925, but exhausted the allotted funds on 15 February 1926 by which time she was estimated to be 46.5% complete. On 7 January 1926 she was given the name Frunze, after the recently deceased Bolshevik military leader Mikhail Frunze. Subsequent plans that focused on reconstructing her as a modernized equivalent to her sisters or even as a battlecruiser, with one turret to be removed to save weight, were considered, but finally abandoned on 23 January 1935 when all work was stopped. In 1934 two of her turrets were sent to reinforce the Vladivostok Fortress fortifications on Russky Island. Kliment Voroshilov approved one last plan to turn her into a floating battery, but the Baltic Works had no capacity to spare and this project was cancelled on 9 July 1939. During this period she was used as a barracks hulk while she was stripped for parts, until she was formally discarded 1 December 1940, after scrapping had already begun at a leisurely pace. After the German invasion she was towed to Kronstadt and run aground late July 1941 near the Leningrad Sea Canal. During the siege of Leningrad her hull was used as a base for small ships. She raised on 31 May 1944, towed to Leningrad and scrapped beginning in 1949.

After World War II two turrets and their guns were used to rebuild Coast Defence Battery 30 (Maksim Gor'kii I) in Sevastopol. It remained in service with the Soviet Navy through 1997. With her two other turrets remaining in Vladivostok, Poltava is sometimes jokingly called "the world's longest battleship" in Russia.

== Bibliography ==
- Budzbon, Przemysław (1985). "Russia". In Gray, Randal (ed.). Conway's All the World's Fighting Ships 1906–1921. Annapolis, Maryland: Naval Institute Press. pp. 291–325. ISBN 0-85177-245-5.
- Budzbon, Przemysław (1980). "Soviet Union". In Chesneau, Roger (ed.). Conway's All the World's Fighting Ships 1922–1946. Greenwich, UK: Conway Maritime Press. pp. 318–346. ISBN 0-85177-146-7.
- Budzbon, Przemysław; Radziemski, Jan & Twardowski, Marek (2022). Warships of the Soviet Fleets 1939–1945. Vol. I: Major Combatants. Annapolis, Maryland: Naval Institute Press. ISBN 978-1-68247-877-6.
- McLaughlin, Stephen (2003). Russian & Soviet Battleships. Annapolis, Maryland: Naval Institute Press. ISBN 1-55750-481-4.
