= Saarenpää =

Saarenpää is a Finnish surname. Notable people with the surname include:

- Klebér Saarenpää (born 1975), Swedish footballer and manager
- Seppo Saarenpää (born 1937), Finnish sport shooter
