= Gangut =

Gangut (Гангут) is the Russian transliteration of the Swedish name (Hangö udd) for Hanko Peninsula. It may have the following meanings:

- The Battle of Gangut in 1714
  - Ships of the Imperial Russian Navy named after the battle:
    - Russian ship of the line Gangut (1719), 92-gun first rate ship of the line, launched in 1719
    - Russian ship of the line Gangut (1825), 84-gun third rate ship of the line, launched in 1825, participated in Battle of Navarino, converted to screw in 1854, training ship in 1862, decommissioned in 1871
    - Russian coast defense ship Gangut (1888)
    - Russian battleship Gangut (1911)
  - Gangut-class battleship
- The Russian name for the town of Hanko during the time Finland was a Grand duchy of the Russian Empire.
- The "Invincible Gangut" (Непокоренный Гангут), the Hanko Soviet naval base in Finland 1940–41 leased by Finland to the Soviet Union in the Moscow Peace Treaty that ended the Winter War.
