= Hanko =

Hanko may refer to

== Places ==
- Hanko, Finland, town and municipality
- Hanko Peninsula, Finland
- Hankø, an island in the Oslo Fjord in Norway
- The asteroid 2299 Hanko

== Other uses ==
- August Hanko (military personnel), German First World War flying ace
- August Hanko (politician), Estonian politician
- Hanko (stamp), a Japanese signature stamp
- Hanko Sushi, a sushi restaurant chain founded in Hanko, Finland
- Elton Ilirjani, an Albanian-American model also known as Hanko

== See also ==
- Gangut (disambiguation), the Russian transliteration of Hangö udd
- Hanco, a given name
- Hankou, a district of Wuhan, China
