= Russian ship Gangut =

At least four ships of the Imperial Russian and Soviet Navies have been named Gangut after the 1714 Battle of Gangut.

- Russian ship of the line Gangut (1719) - 90-gun ship of the line ordered scrapped in 1736.
- Russian ship of the line Gangut (1825) - 84-gun ship of the line that participated in the Battle of Navarino. Rebuilt as a screw frigate in the 1850s and finally stricken in 1871.
- Russian coast defense ship Gangut - Coast defense ship that ran aground and was lost in 1897.
- Russian battleship Gangut (1911) - Lead ship of the Gangut-class dreadnoughts that participated in World War I and World War II before being scrapped in 1956. Renamed Oktyabrskaya Revolutsiya by the Soviets.
