= Minya =

(Al-) Minya may refer to:

== Places and jurisdictions ==
- Minya Governorate in Egypt
  - Minya, Egypt, capital city of the Minya Governorate; Ancient Egyptian name Men'at Khufu, meaning the nursing city of Khufu
- The Coptic Catholic Eparchy of Minya
- Khirbat al-Minya, the remains of an Umayyad qasr (fortified palace) on the Sea of Galilee

== Other ==
- Minya (Xena), a character from the TV series Xena: Warrior Princess
- Minilla, the titular son of the film Son of Godzilla, referred to as "Minya" in dubbed English versions

== Similar names ==
Places (Mina, Menea)

- El Mina, Lebanon
- El Mina, Mauritania
- El Golea (Arabic: القلعة) is an oasis town and commune in Ghardaïa Province, Algeria. The official name is "El Menea".

Other

- Netron Menya, a Russian steam battleship; see the list of Russian battleships

== See also ==
- Minia (disambiguation)
