= Minia =

Minia may refer to:

- Munia (also called a "minia"), a bird of the genus Lonchura
- Minya, Egypt, a city in Egypt
- Minya Governorate, a governorate in Egypt
- Minia Biabiany, Guadeloupean artist, filmmaker, and education researcher
- CS Minia, a cable-laying ship involved in the recover of bodies from the Titanic

== See also ==
- Minya (disambiguation)
