= Russian coast defense ship Gangut =

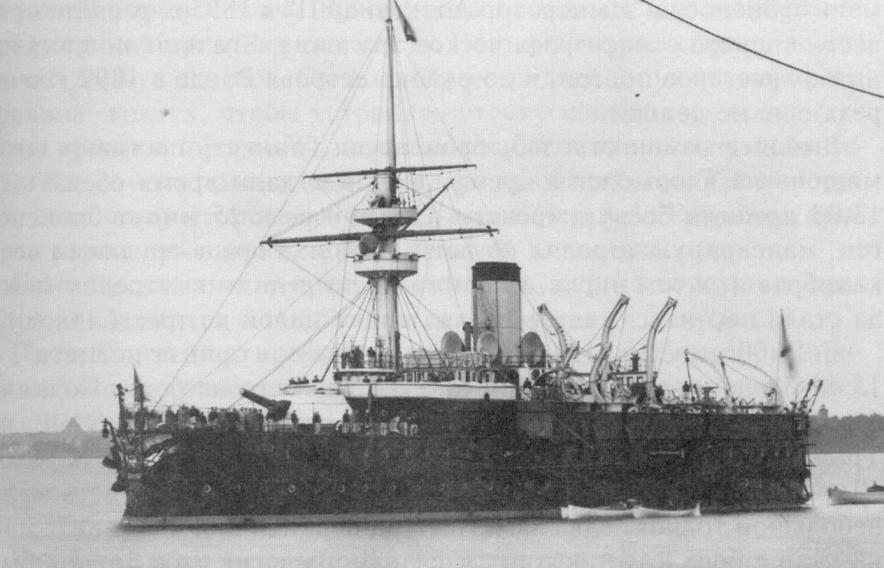
- Gangut

History

Russian Empire
- Name: Gangut
- Namesake: Battle of Gangut
- Builder: New Admiralty Shipyard
- Laid down: 29 October 1888
- Launched: 3 July 1893
- Completed: 1894
- Fate: Sank 12 June 1897

General characteristics
- Class & type: Gangut-class coast defense ship
- Displacement: 7,142 tonnes
- Length: 84.7 m (277 ft 11 in)
- Beam: 18.9 m (62 ft 0 in)
- Draught: 7 m (23 ft 0 in)
- Installed power: 6000 hp natural, 9500 hp forced
- Propulsion: 2 shaft VTE steam engines, 8 cylindrical boilers
- Speed: 13.5 knots (25.0 km/h)
- Range: 2,000 nmi (3,700 km)
- Complement: 521
- Armament: 1 × 305 mm (12 in) gun; 4 × 229 mm (9 in) guns; 4 × 152 mm (6 in) guns; 14 × 37 mm (1.5 in) guns; 6 × 15 in (380 mm) torpedo tubes
- Armour: Compound armour; Belt: 10–16 in (250–410 mm); Barbette: 7–9 in (180–230 mm); Secondary battery: 5 in (130 mm); Conning tower: 10 in (250 mm)

Gangut (Russian: броненосец "Гангут") was an Imperial Russian coast defense ship named after the Battle of Gangut. This ship was a scaled-down version of the Imperator Aleksandr II-class battleships.

== Design and construction ==
The ship was designed as a smaller version of the Imperator Aleksandr II-class battleship on the instruction of Navy Minister Ivan Shestakov. The aim was to have a cheaper vessel able to operate in the shallow water of the Baltic Sea with long range deployment to the Mediterranean and the Far East. The specification was issued in 1887 and the design was approved by the Marine Technical Committee in 1888.

She was built by New Admiralty yard, Saint Petersburg. Construction started on 29 October 1888, and she was launched on 3 July 1893. Completed in 1894, she was 600 tons over her designed displacement which led to an increase in draught and a loss in speed. Her trials were difficult and she had to return to Kronstadt to have repairs after 19 days. Several modernisation schemes to correct the defects were considered but did not proceed due to extensive demands on the Russian shipbuilding industry.

=== Armament ===
The main armament comprised a single 305-millimetre (12 in) gun in a barbette mounting at the bow. The secondary armament comprised four 229-millimetre (9 in) guns in casemates and four 152-millimetre (6.0 in) guns which were not protected. Anti torpedo-boat armament comprised six 47-millimetre (1.9 in) guns and twelve 37-millimetre (1.5 in) Hotchkiss guns. There were also four 63-millimetre (2.5 in) landing guns and six torpedo tubes. The Russian Navy considered replacing the 305 mm gun with another 229 mm gun to reduce weight. Another plan was to replace the secondary armament with new 152 mm Canet guns and leave the 305 mm gun in place.

=== Protection ===
Compound armour was used. The main belt was 2.13 metres (7 ft 0 in) tall but had only 0.91 metres (36 in) height above the mean waterline due to excessive weight. The Russian Navy Marine Technical Kommittee (MTK) considered re-armouring her with a thinner belt of stronger Harvey armour

=== Machinery ===
Two vertical triple expansion steam engines with eight cylindrical boilers were installed. The ship also had a complex drainage system with steam turbine pumps. She proved slower than designed with a maximum speed of 13.8 knots (25.6 km/h; 15.9 mph) rather than the intended 15 knots (28 km/h; 17 mph).

== Sinking ==
On 12 June 1897, Gangut hit an uncharted pinnacle of rock near Vyborg in the Gulf of Finland during a military exercise. A gash along the ship′s bottom led to both boiler rooms flooding and a loss of power to her pumps. Her bulkheads were poorly riveted, leading to leaks. Drawbacks in her design gave her limited stability and resulted in ineffective counter-flooding efforts by her crew. The ship settled and sank slowly on an even keel in 30 metres (98 ft 5 in) of water. There were no fatalities.

The vessel was not popular in the Imperial Russian Navy. Rear Admiral Birilev, her former captain, is quoted as describing her as ".. a vile ship, it's good that she sank, and it is pointless to raise her."

A plan to refloat the ship by the Swedish Neptune Company was not carried out, although divers recovered some items from the ship in 1898.

== See also ==
- Russian battleship Gangut (1911)
- List of Russian battleships
