= Russian ship of the line Gangut (1825) =

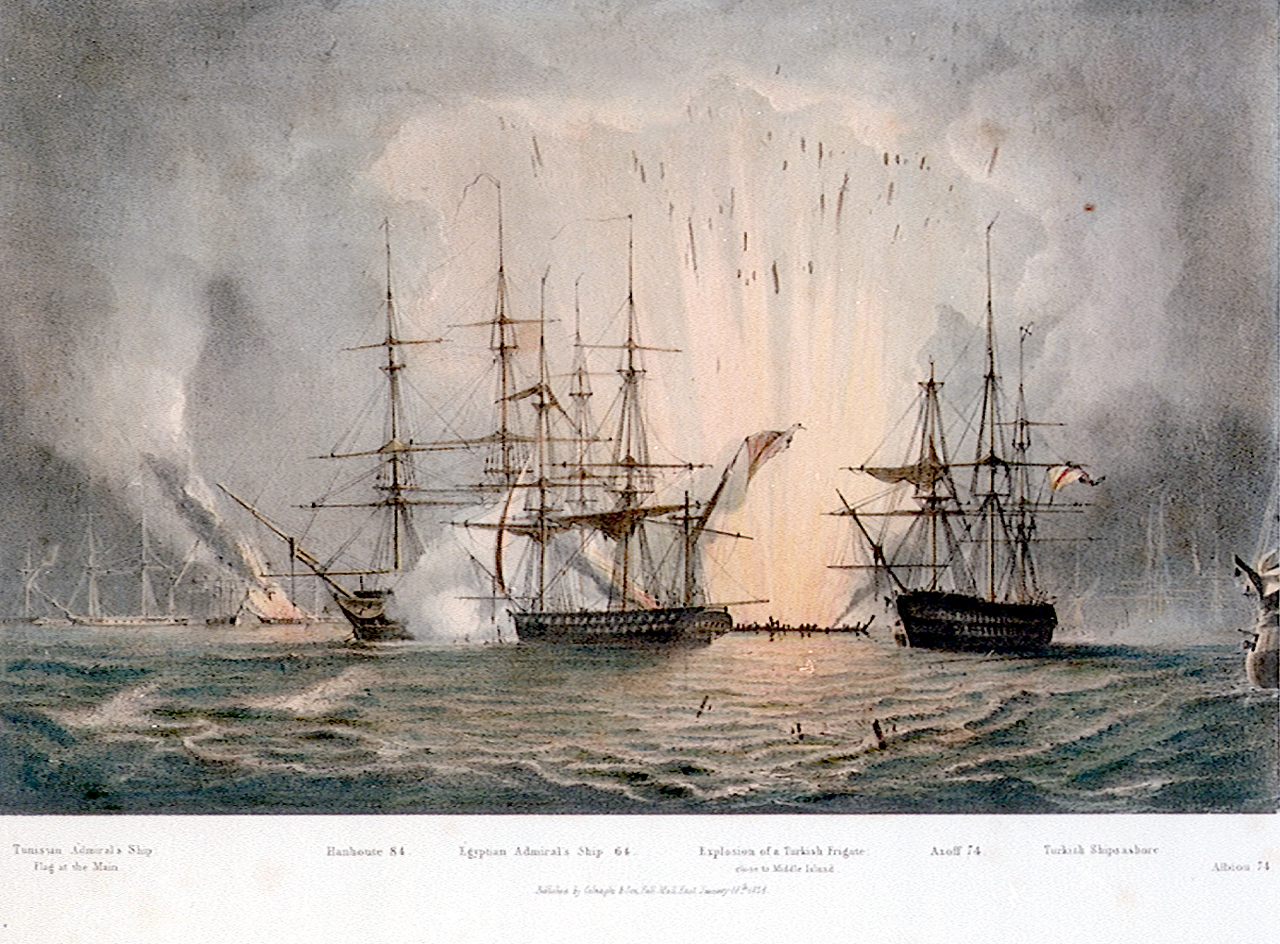
- Gangut (Hanhoute) and Azoff, with explosion of a Turkish frigate, at the Battle of Navarino, 20 Oct 1827

History

Russian Empire
- Name: Gangut
- Namesake: Battle of Gangut
- Builder: St. Petersburg
- Laid down: 8 August 1822 (Note: All dates used in this article are Old Style)
- Launched: 19 September 1825
- In service: 1827
- Stricken: 26 August 1871

General characteristics (as built)
- Type: 84-gun ship of the line
- Tons burthen: 2,659 (bm)
- Length: 196 ft (59.7 m) (p/p)
- Beam: 51 ft (15.5 m)
- Draft: 23 ft 7 in (7.2 m)
- Armament: 34 × short 24-pounder guns; 26 × 24-pounder carronades; 24 × short 36-pounder guns; 6 × 60-pounder licornes

General characteristics (rebuilt as a steamer)
- Displacement: 3,814 long tons (3,875 t)
- Length: 212 ft (64.6 m) (p/p)
- Beam: 53 ft 8 in (16.4 m)
- Draft: 23 ft 1 in (7.0 m)
- Installed power: 500 Nominal horsepower; 4 boilers
- Propulsion: 1 Steam engine
- Speed: 9 knots (17 km/h; 10 mph)
- Armament: 16 × 30-pounder gunnades; 32 × short 30-pounder guns; 8 × long 30-pounder guns; 28 × 60-pounder shell guns

Gangut (Russian: Гангут) was an 84-gun ship of the line built for the Imperial Russian Navy in the early 1820s. She participated in the Battle of Navarino in 1827 and was credited with destroying three Ottoman ships. The ship was forced to return to the Baltic Sea for repairs and remained part of the Baltic Fleet for the rest of her career. Gangut was one of the ships deployed to Denmark during the First Schleswig War of 1848–50 to help preserve Denmark's territorial integrity against Prussia. The ship was converted to steam power in 1854–57 and she made one deployment to the Mediterranean in 1859–60 before she became a gunnery training ship in 1862. Gangut was stricken from the navy list in 1871 and sold for scrap.

== Description ==
Gangut was 196 feet (59.7 m) long between perpendiculars, with a beam of 51 feet (15.5 m) and a maximum draft of 23 feet 7 inches (7.2 m). The ship measured 2,659 tons bm. As built she was armed with a variety of smoothbore guns: On the forecastle and quarterdeck, the ship was fitted with two short 24-pounder guns and twenty-six 24-pounder carronades. On her upper deck, she carried 32 short 24-pounder guns and, on her lower deck, Gangut was fitted with 24 short 36-pounder guns and six 60-pounder licornes. In 1848 she was rearmed with 32 long 24-pounder guns on the middle deck and two 9.65-inch (245 mm) shell guns, 24 long 36-pounders and four 60-pounder licornes on the lower deck.

In 1854–56, Gangut was rebuilt and converted to steam with a steam engine of 500 nominal horsepower that drove a single propeller shaft. Steam was provided by four boilers and she had a maximum speed of 9 knots (17 km/h; 10 mph). Enlarged to accommodate the steam engine and its boilers, she displaced 3,814 long tons (3,875 t) and now measured 212 feet (64.6 m) between perpendiculars. Her beam was increased to 53 feet 8 inches (16.4 m) and her draft was reduced to 23 feet 1 inch (7.0 m). Gangut was also rearmed when her reconstruction was complete. The ship now carried four short 30-pounders and sixteen 30-pounder gunnades on her quarterdeck and forecastle, four long and 28 short 30-pounder guns on her upper deck, and twenty-eight 60-pounder shell guns and four long 30-pounder guns on her lower deck.

== Construction and career ==
Gangut, named after the Battle of Gangut, was laid down on 8 August 1822 at the New Admiralty Shipyard in St. Petersburg. The ship was launched on 19 September 1825 and entered service in 1827. She was assigned to Rear Admiral Login Geiden's squadron of the Baltic Fleet bound for the Mediterranean after completion. They departed Kronstadt on 10 June and fought at the Battle of Navarino off the coast of Greece on 8 October. Gangut was credited with sinking two Ottoman frigates, a fire ship, and destroying a shore battery. She was hit 52 times during the battle and lost 14 killed and 37 wounded crewmen. Before returning to the Baltic for repairs, the ship transferred all but two rounds per gun to the other ships of the squadron. Gangut arrived back in Kronstadt in August 1828 and was repaired in time to cruise the Baltic in 1829–30 and 1832–33. The ship was overhauled during 1834–37 and cruised the Baltic again in 1838–42 and 1845–46. She was refitted in 1848 and sailed to Denmark, along with most of the Baltic Fleet, to show the flag during the First Schleswig War between Denmark, Sweden and Prussia. Tsar Nicholas I was determined to support the integrity of Denmark so he deployed a large force in Danish waters for the duration of the war, although it did not actively participate in the war.

Gangut was rebuilt as a screw ship of the line between 2 June 1854 and 24 September 1856 and conducted her sea trials in October 1857. She cruised the Baltic the following year before she went to the Mediterranean in 1859–60 as part of Rear Admiral Nordman's squadron. Gangut became a gunnery training ship in 1862–63 and she was stricken from the naval list on 26 August 1871 and subsequently scrapped.
