= Hanko Sushi =

Finland's largest sushi chain

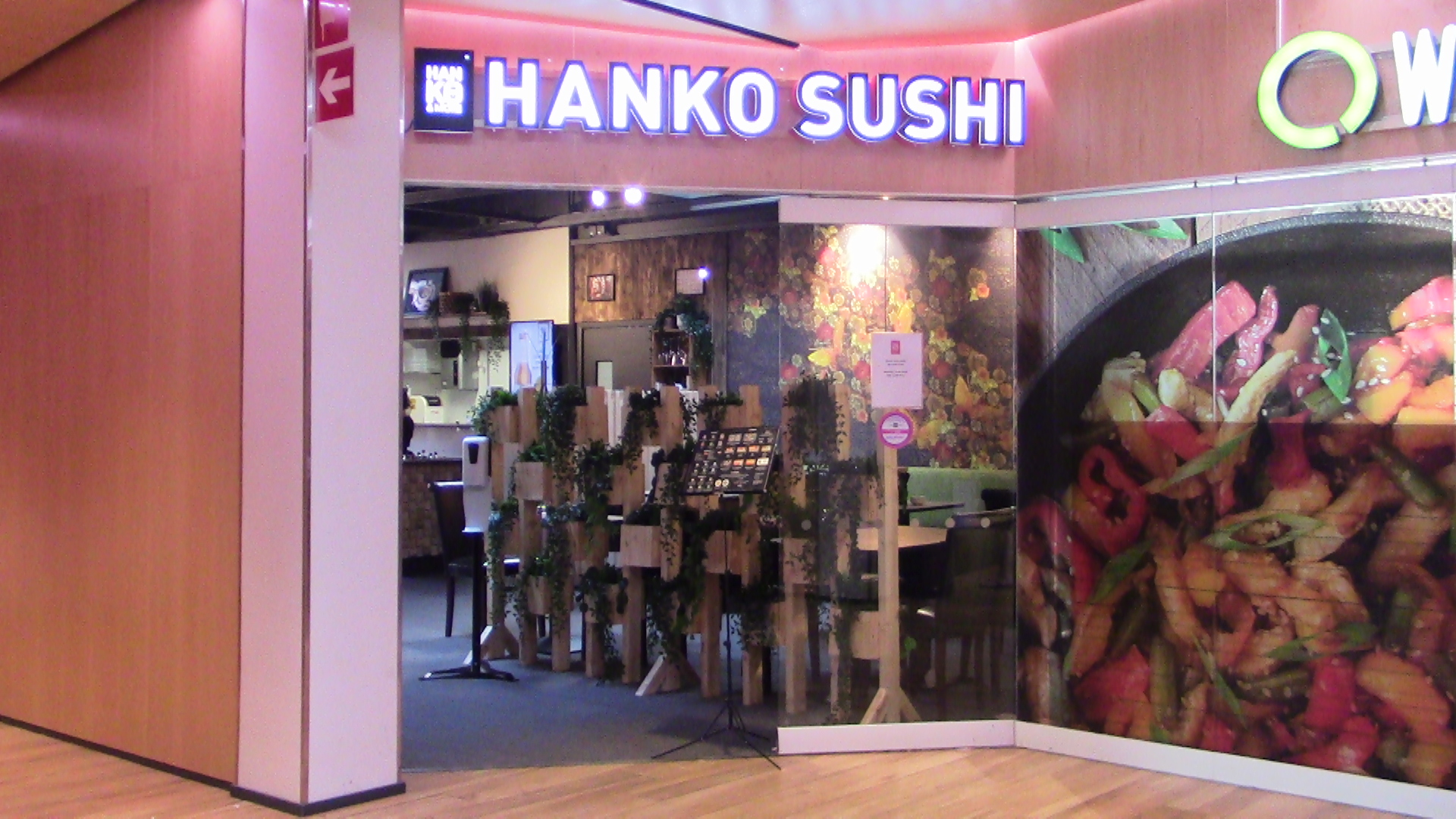
A Hanko Sushi restaurant in the shopping centre Valkea in Oulu.

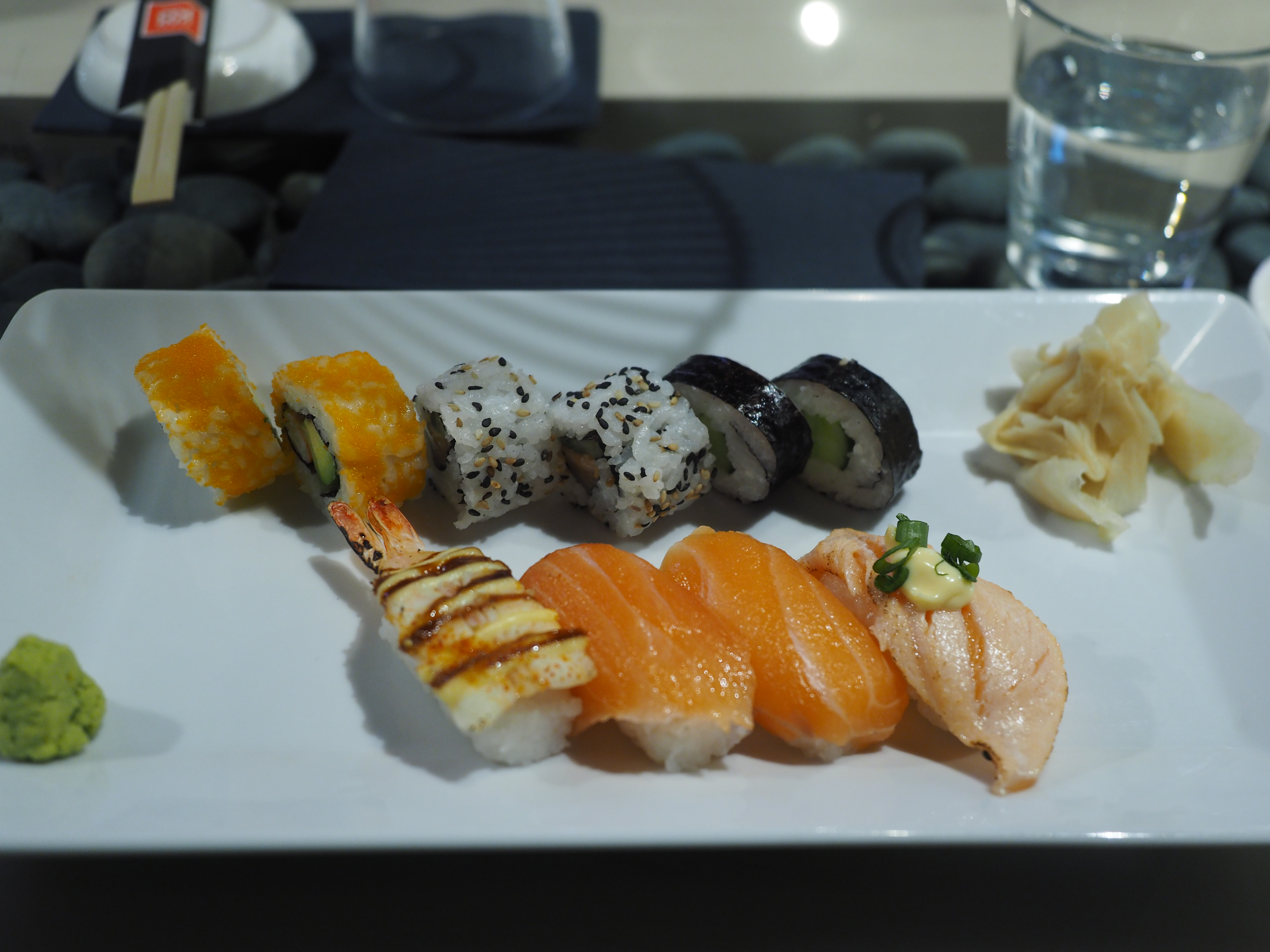
A sushi selection at a Hanko Sushi restaurant in Lauttasaari, Helsinki.

Hanko Sushi is a Finnish restaurant chain founded in 2009 in Hanko, focusing on sushi. The chain has 22 restaurants in Finland, of which 11 are in Helsinki, two each in Espoo and Tampere, and one each in Jyväskylä, Kuopio, Oulu, Raisio, Ruka, and Vantaa. Hanko Sushi is the largest sushi chain in Finland in terms of both number of restaurants and revenue.

The word Hanko in the chain's name refers both to the Japanese language word for "rubber stamp" and the city of Hanko where the first restaurant was opened.

The operations of the chain are handled by the limited company Sushi World Oy. In 2019 its revenue was 13.5 million euro and the profit was 36 thousand euro. Hanko Sushi was founded in 2009 by Rolf Wirta and Mika Laakio. The chain has been owned by Royal Ravintolat since 2014, which fused with Restamax in 2018 and was renamed NoHo Partners.
