= Hanco =

Hanco is a given name. Notable people with the given name include:

- Hanco Germishuys (born 1996), American rugby union player
- Hanco Kolk (born 1957), Dutch cartoonist and comics artist
- Hanco Olivier (born 1995), South African cricketer
- Hanco Venter (born 1993), South African rugby union player
