= List of battleships of Russia and the Soviet Union =

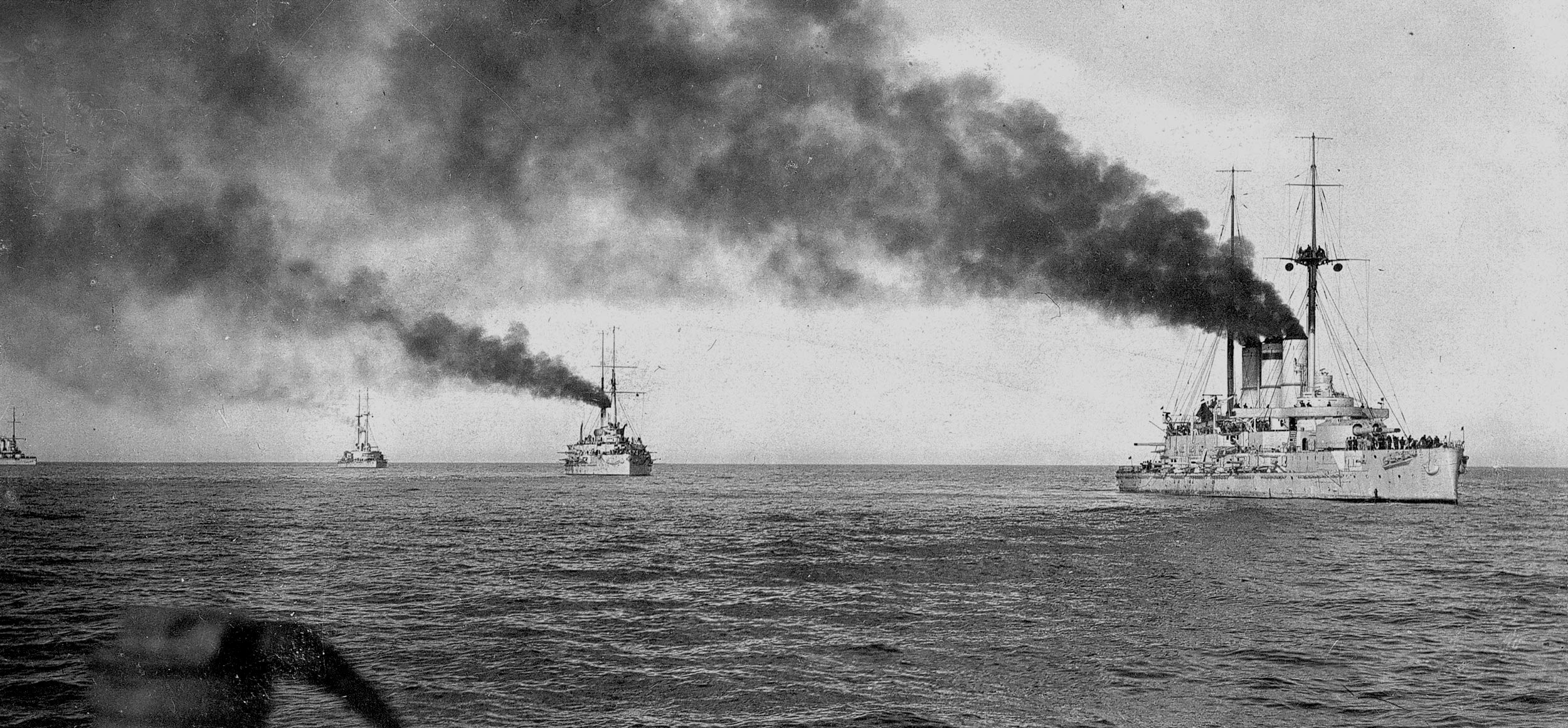
Russian battleships in the Black Sea during World War I

This is a list of battleships of Russian Empire and the Soviet Union.

Key
Armament	The number and type of the primary armament
Armor	The thickness of the belt armor.
Displacement	Ship displacement at full combat load
Propulsion	Number of shafts, type of propulsion system, designed indicated horsepower, and top speed in knots
Service	The dates work began and finished on the ship and its ultimate fate
Laid down	The date the keel began to be assembled
Launched	The date that the ship was launched
Commissioned	The date the ship was commissioned

== Pre-Dreadnoughts ==
=== Dvenadsat Apostolov ===
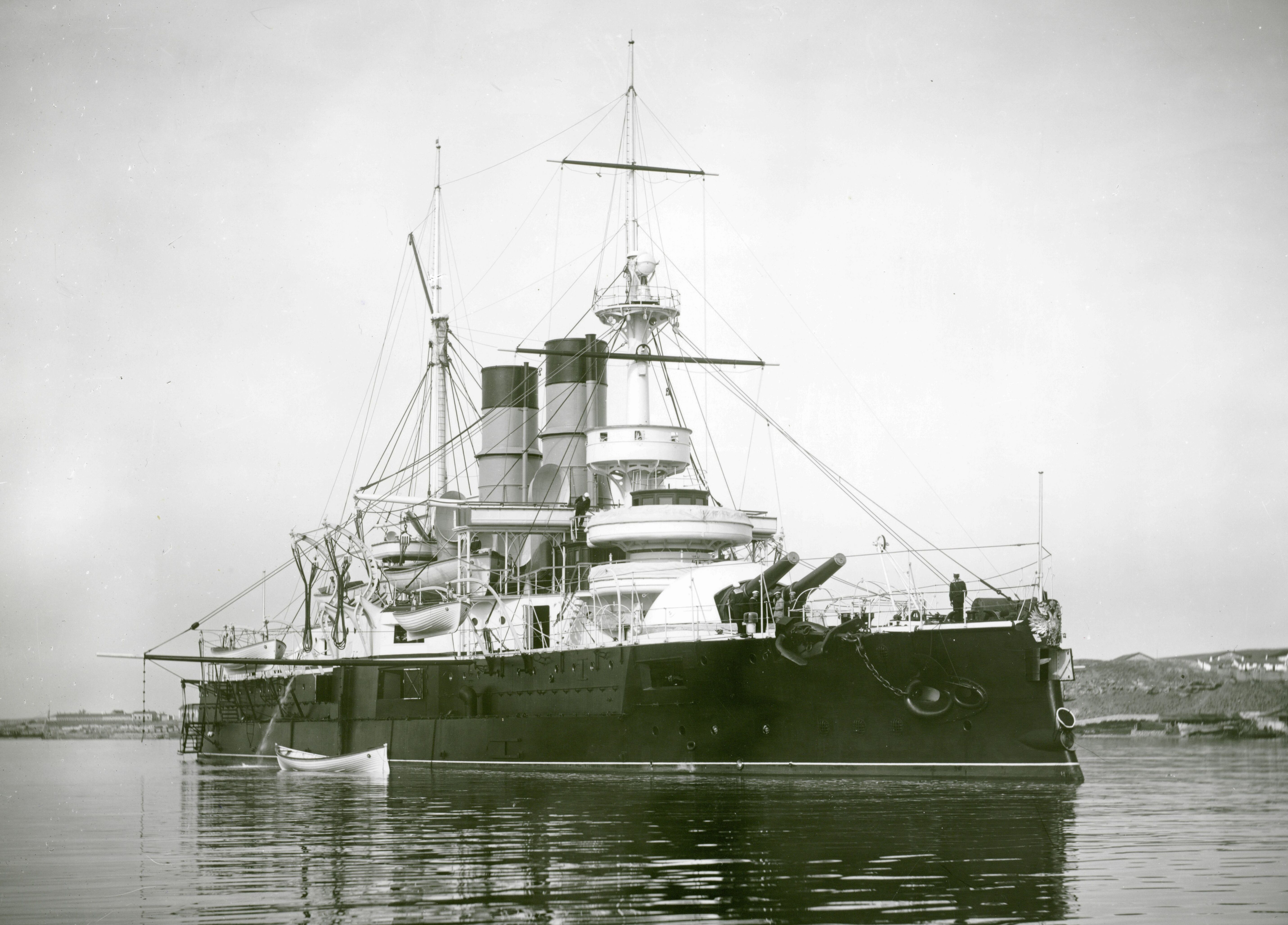
Dvenadsat Apostolov at anchor, Sevastopol

Dvenadsat Apostolov was a pre-dreadnought battleship built for the Black Sea Fleet. She joined the fleet in mid-1893, but was not fully ready for service until 1894. Dvenadsat Apostolov participated in the failed attempt to recapture the mutinous battleship Potemkin in 1905. Decommissioned and disarmed in 1911, the ship became an immobile submarine depot ship the following year. Dvenadsat Apostolov was captured by the Germans in 1918 in Sevastopol and was handed over to the Allies in December. Lying immobile in Sevastopol, she was captured by both sides in the Russian Civil War before she was abandoned when the White Russians evacuated the Crimea in 1920. The ship was used as a stand-in for the title ship during the filming of The Battleship Potemkin and was finally scrapped in 1931.

Ship	Armament	Armor	Displacement	Propulsion	Service		
Ship	Armament	Armor	Displacement	Propulsion	Laid down	Launched	Fate
Dvenadsat Apostolov (Двенадцать Апостолов)	4 × 12 in (305 mm)	14 in (356 mm)	8,076 long tons (8,206 t)	2 shafts, 2 triple-expansion steam engines,14.5 knots (26.9 km/h; 16.7 mph)	21 August 1889	13 September 1890	Scrapped, 1931

=== Navarin ===
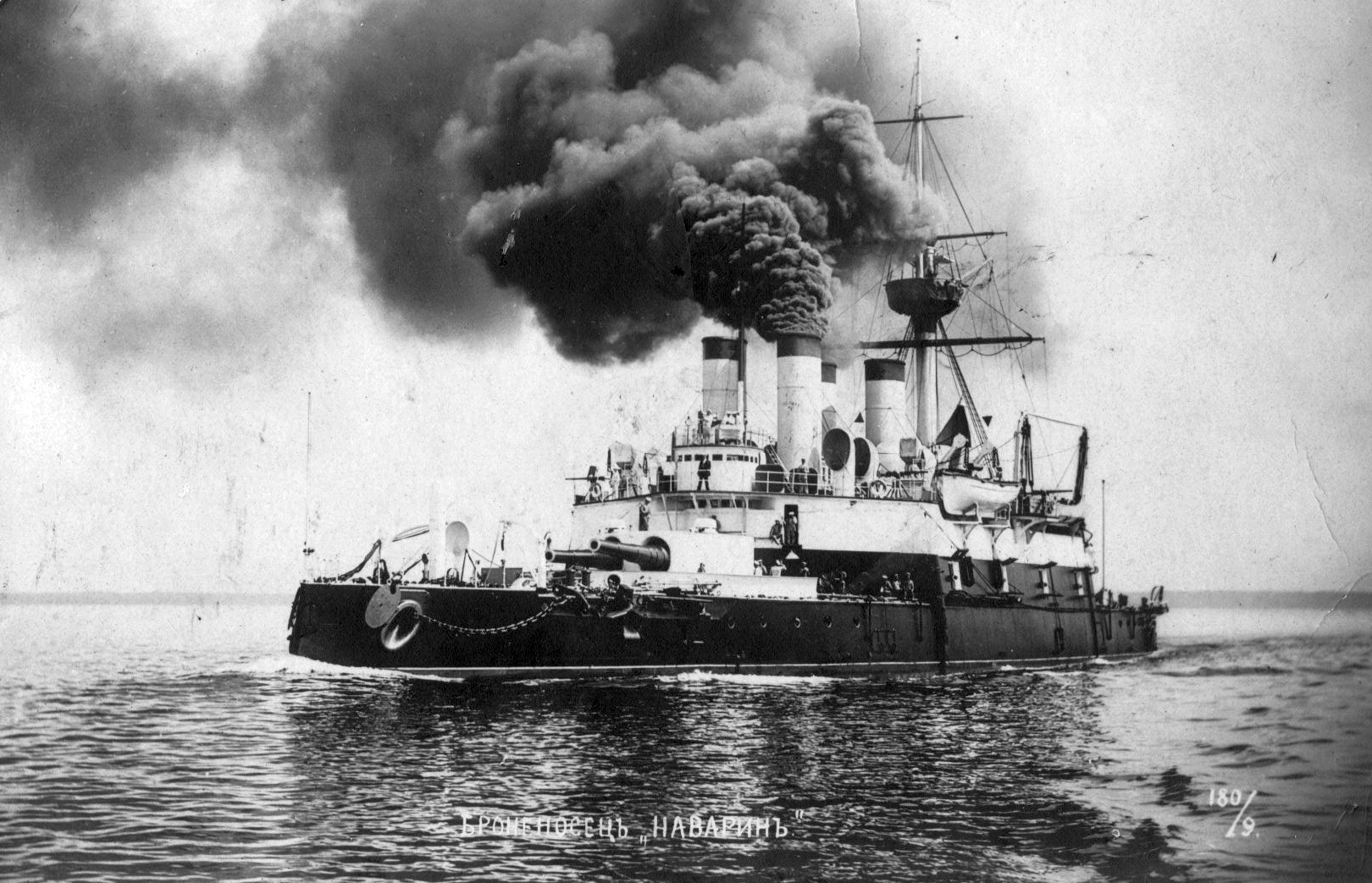
Navarin in 1902

Navarin was a pre-dreadnought battleship built for the Baltic Fleet in the late 1880s and early 1890s. The ship spent the early part of her career deployed in the Mediterranean and in the Far East. She participated in the suppression of the Boxer Rebellion in 1900 before returning to the Baltic Fleet in 1901. Several months after the beginning of the Russo-Japanese War in February 1904, she was assigned to the 2nd Pacific Squadron to relieve the Russian forces blockaded in Port Arthur. During the Battle of Tsushima in May 1905, she was sunk by Japanese destroyers which spread twenty-four linked mines across her path during the night. Navarin struck two of these mines and capsized with the loss of most of her crew.

Ship	Armament	Armor	Displacement	Propulsion	Service		
Ship	Armament	Armor	Displacement	Propulsion	Laid down	Launched	Fate
Navarin (Наварин)	4 × 12 in	16 in (406 mm)	10,206 long tons (10,370 t)	2 shafts, 2 triple-expansion steam engines, 14 knots (26 km/h; 16 mph)	31 May 1890	20 October 1891	Sunk at the Battle of Tsushima, 28 May 1905

=== Tri Sviatitelia ===
Tri Sviatitelia at anchor

Tri Sviatitelia was a pre-dreadnought battleship built for the Black Sea Fleet. She was flagship of the forces pursuing the mutinous battleship Potemkin in June 1905. During World War I the ship encountered the German battlecruiser SMS Goeben (formally Yavuz Sultan Selim) twice, but never hit the German ship, nor was she damaged by her. From 1915 onward she was relegated to the coast bombardment role as she was the oldest battleship in the Black Sea Fleet. Tri Sviatitelia was refitting in Sevastopol when the February Revolution of 1917 began and she was never operational afterwards.

Tri Sviatitelia was captured when the Germans took the city in May 1918 and was turned over to the Allies after the Armistice in November 1918. Her engines were destroyed in 1919 by the British when they withdrew from Sevastopol to prevent the advancing Bolsheviks from using her against the White Russians. She was abandoned when the Whites evacuated the Crimea in 1920 and was scrapped in 1923.

Ship	Armament	Armor	Displacement	Propulsion	Service		
Ship	Armament	Armor	Displacement	Propulsion	Laid down	Launched	Fate
Tri Sviatitelia (Три Святителя)	4 × 12 in	18 in (457 mm)	13,318 long tons (13,532 t)	2 shafts, 2 triple-expansion steam engines, 16 knots (30 km/h; 18 mph)	15 August 1891	12 November 1893	Scrapped, 1923

=== Sissoi Veliky ===
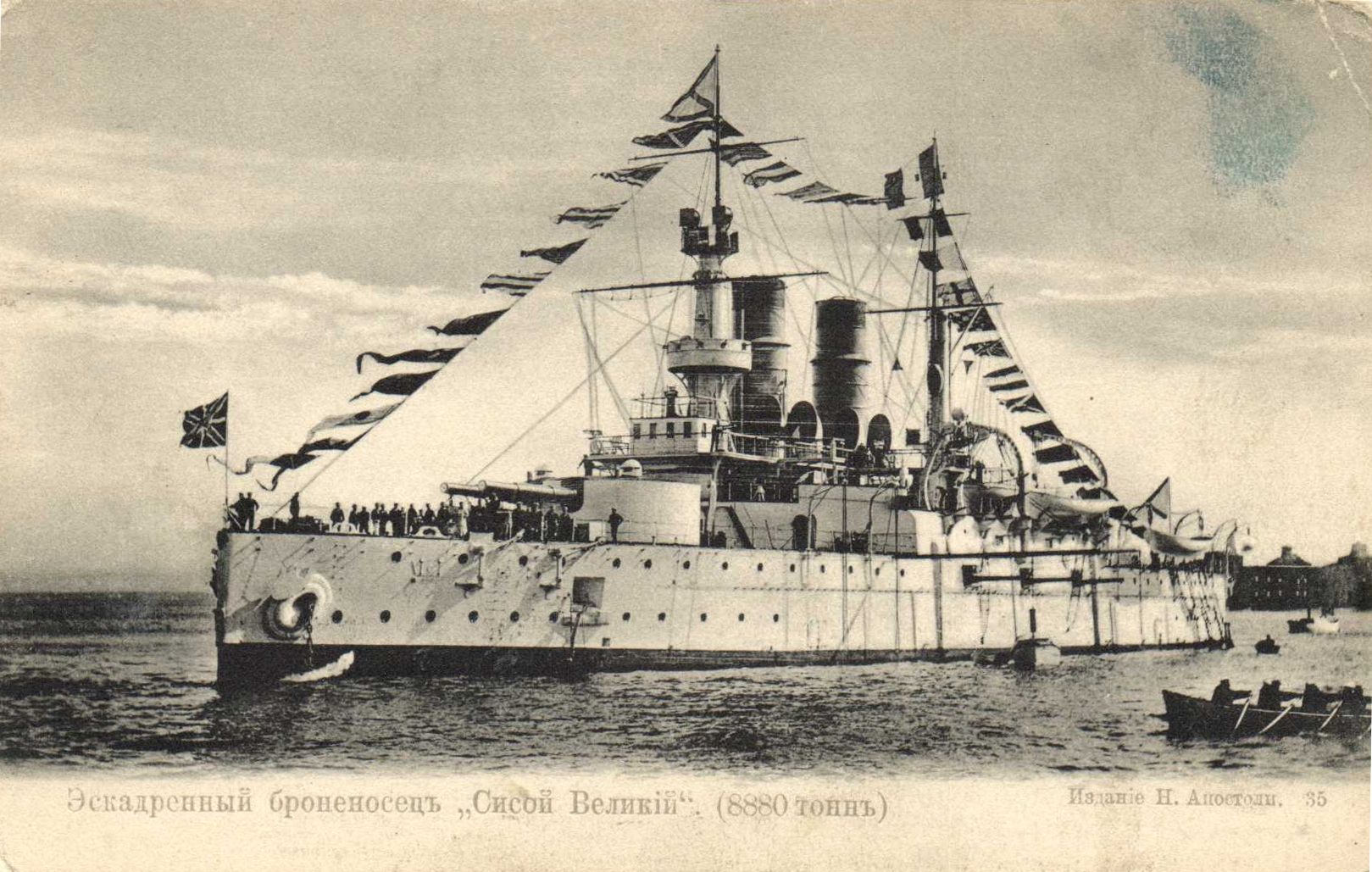
A postcard of Sissoi Veliky at anchor

Sissoi Veliky was a pre-dreadnought battleship built for the Baltic Fleet in the 1890s. The ship's construction was marred by organizational, logistical and engineering problems and dragged on for more than five years. She was commissioned in October 1896 with an appalling number of design and construction faults, and only a few of them were fixed during her lifetime. Immediately after sea trials, Sissoi Veliky sailed to the Mediterranean to enforce the naval blockade of Crete during the Greco-Turkish War. In 1897 she suffered a devastating explosion of the aft gun turret that killed 21 men. After nine months in the docks of Toulon for repairs, the ship sailed to the Far East to reinforce the Russian presence there. In the summer of 1900, Sissoi Veliky supported the international campaign against the Boxer Rebellion in China. Sailors from Sissoi Veliky and Navarin participated in the defence of the International Legations in Beijing for more than two months.

In 1902 the ship returned to Kronstadt for repairs, but very little was achieved until the early losses of the Russo-Japanese War caused the formation of the Second Pacific Squadron to relieve the Russian forces blockaded in Port Arthur. Sissoi Veliky sailed for the Far East with the rest of the Baltic battleships and participated in the Battle of Tsushima on 27 May 1905. She survived the daytime artillery duel with Admiral Heihachirō Tōgō's ships, but was badly damaged and taking on water. During the night Japanese destroyers scored a torpedo hit on the ship that damaged her steering. The next morning the ship was unable to maintain speed because of flooding, and her crew surrendered to Japanese armed merchant cruisers. The ship capsized later that morning with the loss of 47 crewmen.

Ship	Armament	Armor	Displacement	Propulsion	Service		
Ship	Armament	Armor	Displacement	Propulsion	Laid down	Launched	Fate
Sissoi Veliky (Сисой Великий)	4 × 12 in	14 in	9,594 long tons (9,748 t)	2 shafts, 2 triple-expansion steam engines, 15 knots (28 km/h; 17 mph)	19 May 1892	1 June 1894	Sunk at the Battle of Tsushima, 28 May 1905

=== Petropavlovsk class ===
The Petropavlovsk class, sometimes referred to as the Poltava class, was a class of three pre-dreadnought battleships built for the Imperial Russian Navy during the 1890s. They were transferred to the Pacific Squadron upon completion and based at Port Arthur before the start of the Russo-Japanese War of 1904–1905. All three ships participated in the Battle of Port Arthur on the second day of the war. Petropavlovsk sank two months after the war began after striking one or more mines laid by the Japanese. The remaining two ships participated in the Battle of the Yellow Sea in August 1904 and were sunk or scuttled during the final stages of the Siege of Port Arthur.

Poltava was salvaged after the Japanese captured Port Arthur and incorporated into the Imperial Japanese Navy. The ship, renamed Tango in Japanese service, participated in the Battle of Tsingtao in late 1914, during World War I. She was sold back to the Russians in 1916 and renamed Chesma as her original name was in use by another battleship. The ship became the flagship of the Russian Arctic Flotilla in 1917 and her crew supported the Bolsheviks later that year. She was seized by the British in early 1918 when they intervened in the Russian Civil War, abandoned by them when they withdrew and scrapped by the Soviets in 1924.

Ship	Armament	Armor	Displacement	Propulsion	Service		
Ship	Armament	Armor	Displacement	Propulsion	Laid down	Launched	Fate
Poltava (Полтава)	4 × 12 in	14.5–16 in (368–406 mm)	11,500 long tons (11,685 t)	2 screws, 2 triple-expansion steam engines, 16 kn (30 km/h; 18 mph)	19 May 1892	6 November 1894	Scrapped, 1924
Petropavlovsk (Петропавловск)	4 × 12 in	14.5–16 in (368–406 mm)	11,500 long tons (11,685 t)	2 screws, 2 triple-expansion steam engines, 16 kn (30 km/h; 18 mph)	19 May 1892	9 November 1894	Sunk by mine, 13 April 1904
Sevastopol (Севастополь)	4 × 12 in	14.5–16 in (368–406 mm)	11,500 long tons (11,685 t)	2 screws, 2 triple-expansion steam engines, 16 kn (30 km/h; 18 mph)	19 May 1892	1 June 1895	Scuttled, 2 January 1905

=== Rostislav ===
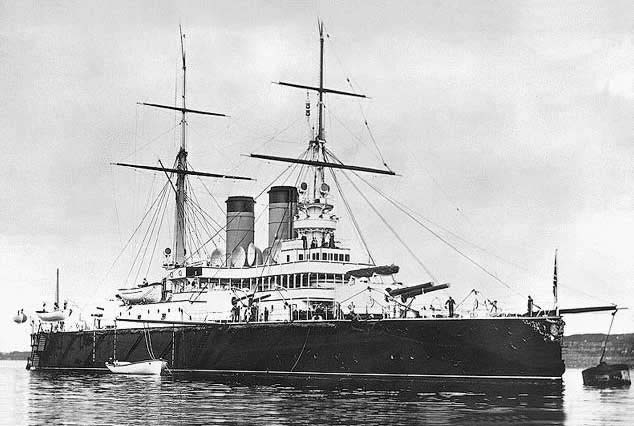
Rostislav circa 1901

Rostislav was a pre-dreadnought battleship built for the Black Sea Fleet in the 1890s. She was conceived as a small, inexpensive coastal defence ship, but the Navy abandoned the concept in favor of a compact, seagoing battleship with a displacement of 8,880 long tons (9,022 t). Poor design and construction practices increased her actual displacement by more than 1,600 long tons (1,626 t). Rostislav became the world's first capital ship to burn fuel oil, rather than coal. Her combat ability was compromised by the use of 10-inch (254 mm) main guns instead of the de facto Russian standard of 12 inches.

Her hull was launched in September 1896, but non-delivery of the ship's main guns delayed her maiden voyage until 1899 and her completion until 1900. In May 1899 Rostislav became the first ship of the Imperial Navy to be commanded by a member of the House of Romanov, Captain Alexander Mikhailovich. From 1903 to 1912 the ship was the flagship of the second-in-command of the Black Sea Fleet. During the 1905 Russian Revolution her crew was on the verge of mutiny but remained loyal to the regime, and actively suppressed the mutiny of the cruiser Ochakov.

Rostislav was actively engaged in World War I until the collapse of the Black Sea Fleet in the beginning of 1918. She was the first Russian ship to fire upon enemy targets on land during World War I, the first Russian ship to be hit by a German airstrike, and the first one to destroy a submarine, albeit a Russian one. In April 1918 the fleeing Bolsheviks abandoned Rostislav in Sevastopol. One year later the British occupation forces permanently disabled her engines. The White forces repurposed the ship as a towed floating battery, then scuttled her in the Strait of Kerch in November 1920.

Ship	Armament	Armour	Displacement	Propulsion	Service		
Ship	Armament	Armour	Displacement	Propulsion	Laid down	Launched	Fate
Rostislav (Ростислав)	4 × 10 in (254 mm)	368 mm (14 in)	10,520 long tons (10,689 t)	2 screws, 2 triple-expansion steam engines, 15 kn (28 km/h; 17 mph)	30 January 1894 (actual); 19 May 1895 (formal)	2 September 1896	Scuttled, November 1920

=== Peresvet class ===
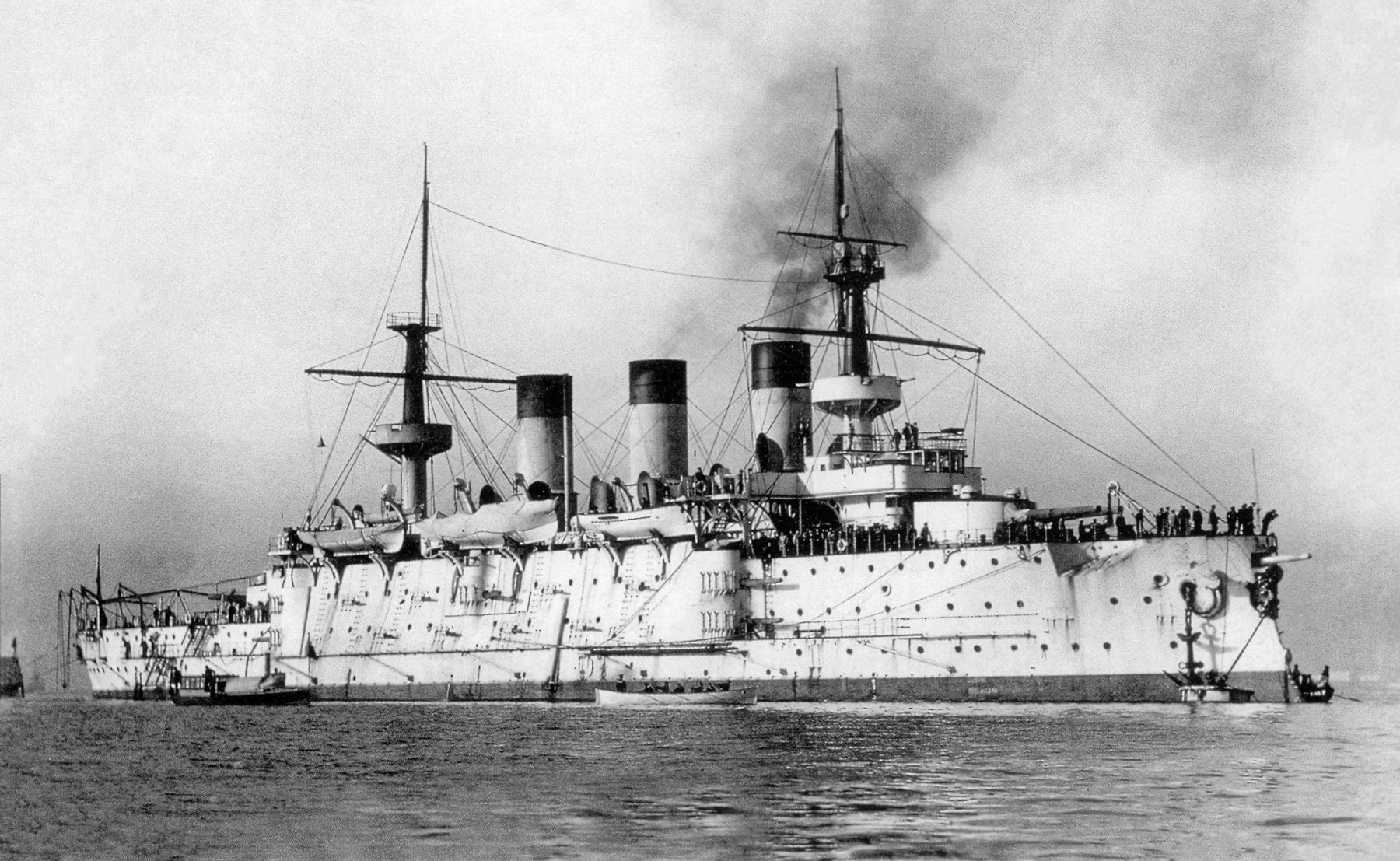
Peresvet in the Mediterranean Sea, 1901

The Peresvet class was a class of three pre-dreadnought battleships built for the Imperial Russian Navy around the end of the 19th century. Peresvet and Pobeda were transferred to the Pacific Squadron upon completion and based at Port Arthur from 1901 and 1903. All three ships were lost by the Russians in the Russo-Japanese War; Peresvet and Pobeda participated in the Battles of Port Arthur and the Yellow Sea and were sunk during the Siege of Port Arthur. Oslyabya, the third ship, was sunk at the Battle of Tsushima with the loss of over half her crew. Peresvet and Pobeda were salvaged after the Japanese captured Port Arthur and incorporated into the Imperial Japanese Navy. Peresvet was sold back to the Russians during World War I and sank after hitting German mines in the Mediterranean in early 1917 while Pobeda, renamed Suwo, participated in the Battle of Tsingtao in late 1914. She became a gunnery training ship in 1917 until she was disarmed and hulked in 1922–1923. The ship was scrapped after the end of World War II.

Ship	Armament	Armor	Displacement	Propulsion	Service		
Ship	Armament	Armor	Displacement	Propulsion	Laid down	Launched	Fate
Peresvet (Пересвет)	4 × 10 in	9 in	13,320–14,408 long tons (13,534–14,639 t)	3 screws, 3 triple-expansion steam engines, 18 kn (33 km/h; 21 mph)	21 November 1895	19 May 1898	Sunk by mine, 4 January 1917
Oslyabya (Ослябя)	4 × 10 in	9 in	13,320–14,408 long tons (13,534–14,639 t)	3 screws, 3 triple-expansion steam engines, 18 kn (33 km/h; 21 mph)	21 November 1895	8 November 1898	Sunk during the Battle of Tsushima, 27 May 1905
Pobeda (Победа)	4 × 10 in	9 in	13,320–14,408 long tons (13,534–14,639 t)	3 screws, 3 triple-expansion steam engines, 18 kn (33 km/h; 21 mph)	30 May 1898	21 February 1899	Scrapped, 1946

=== Potemkin ===
Kniaz Potemkin Tavricheskiy («Князь Потёмкин-Таврический», 1900 BSF) – Renamed Panteleimon («Пантелеймон») 1905, renamed Potemkin-Tavricheskiy («Потёмкин-Таврический) 1917, Borets za Svobodu («Борец за Свободу») 1917, destroyed by British troops at Sevastopol 1919 {-}

Ship	Armament	Armor	Displacement	Propulsion	Service		
Ship	Armament	Armor	Displacement	Propulsion	Laid down	Launched	Fate
Potemkin (Князь Потёмкин-Таврический)	4 × 12 in	9 in (229 mm)	12,900 long tons (13,107 t)	2 shafts, 2 triple-expansion steam engines, 16 kn (30 km/h; 18 mph)	10 October 1898	9 October 1900	Scrapped, 1923

=== Retvizan ===
Retvizan (Ретвизан) was a pre-dreadnought battleship built before the Russo-Japanese War for the Imperial Russian Navy in the United States. She was built by the William Cramp & Sons Ship & Engine Building Company of Philadelphia, although the armament was made at the Obukhov works in Saint Petersburg and shipped to America for installation.

Retvizan was torpedoed during the Japanese surprise attack on Port Arthur during the night of 8–9 February 1904 and grounded in the harbor entrance when she attempted to take refuge inside as her draft had significantly deepened from all of the water she had taken aboard after the torpedo hit. She was eventually refloated and repaired by mid-June. She joined the rest of the 1st Pacific Squadron when they attempted to reach Vladivostok though the Japanese blockade on 10 August. The Japanese battle fleet engaged them in the Battle of the Yellow Sea and forced most of the Russian ships to return to Port Arthur after killing the squadron commander and damaging his flagship. She was sunk by Japanese howitzers in December after the Japanese had gained control of the heights around the harbor.

The Japanese raised her after the surrender of Port Arthur in January 1905 and repaired her. She was commissioned in the Imperial Japanese Navy as Hizen (肥前) in 1908. In Sasebo when the Japanese declared war on Germany in 1914 she was sent to reinforce the weak British squadron in British Columbia, but was diverted to Hawaii when reports of the arrival of a German gunboat there were received. She was sent to search for other German ships after the Americans interned the German ship in November, but did not encounter any. After World War I she supported the Japanese intervention in the Russian Civil War, but was disarmed in 1922 in accordance with the Washington Naval Treaty. She was sunk as a gunnery target in 1924.

Ship	Armament	Armor	Displacement	Propulsion	Service		
Ship	Armament	Armor	Displacement	Propulsion	Laid down	Launched	Fate
Retvizan (Ретвизан)	4 × 12 in	9 in	12,780 long tons (12,985 t)	2 shafts, 2 triple-expansion steam engines, 18 knots (33 km/h; 21 mph)	29 July 1899	23 October 1900	Sunk as a target, 25 July 1924

=== Tsesarevich ===
Tsesarevich (Цесаревич) was a pre-dreadnought built in France for the Pacific Squadron. She participated in the Russo-Japanese War, and was the flagship of Admiral Wilgelm Vitgeft in the Battle of the Yellow Sea. Her design was the basis of the Borodino-class battleships which were built in Russia.

Ship	Armament	Armor	Displacement	Propulsion	Service		
Ship	Armament	Armor	Displacement	Propulsion	Laid down	Launched	Fate
Tsesarevich (Цесаревич); Renamed Grazhdanin (Гражданин), 1917	4 × 12 in	9.8 in (250 mm)	13,105 long tons (13,315 t)	2 shafts, 2 triple-expansion steam engines, 18 knots (33 km/h; 21 mph)	8 July 1899	23 February 1901	Scrapped, 1924

=== Borodino class ===
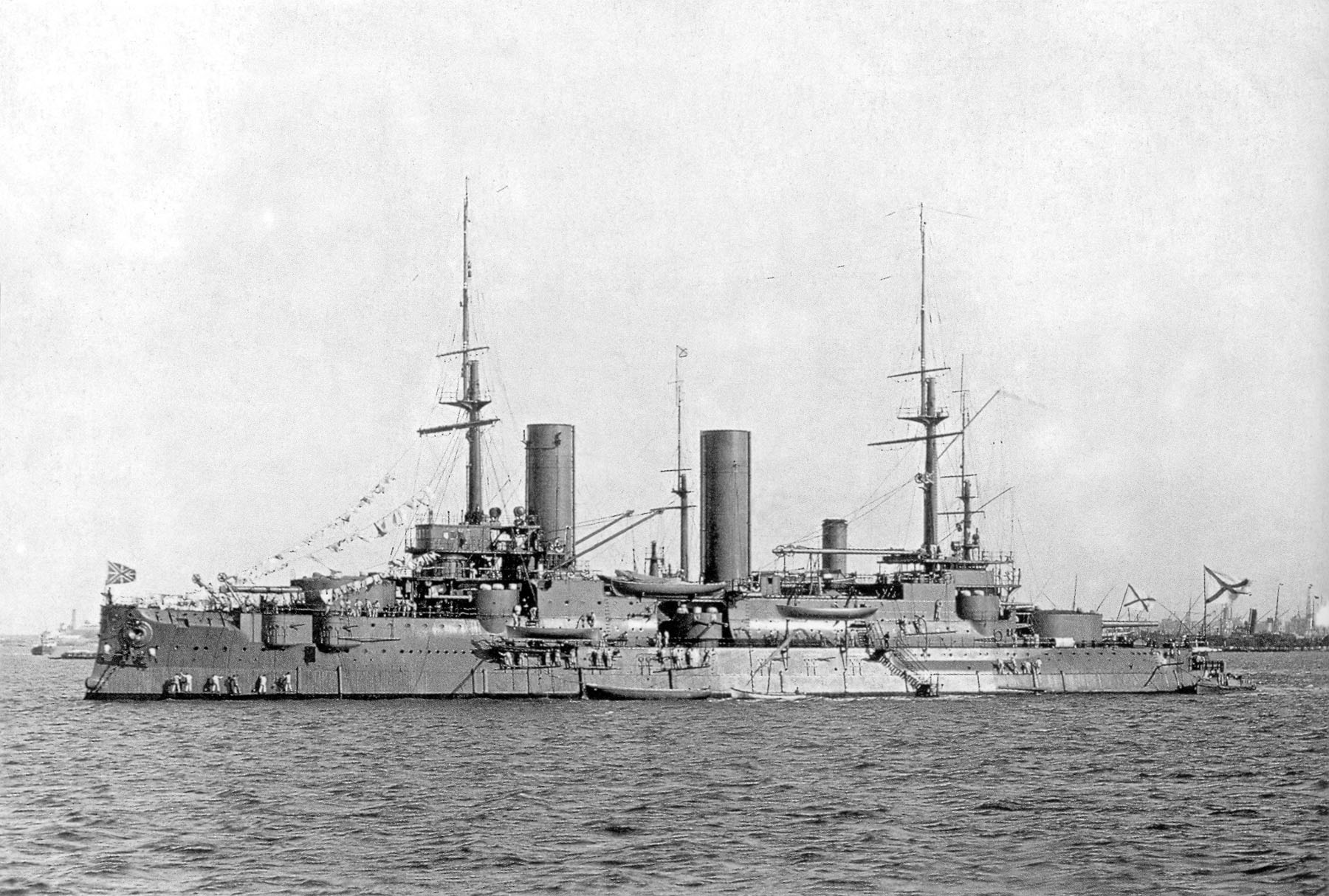
Slava in Kronstadt, early 1910s

The five Borodino-class battleships (also known as the Suvorov class) were pre-dreadnoughts built between 1899 and 1905 for the Pacific Squadron. Three of the class were sunk and one captured by the Imperial Japanese Navy during the Battle of Tsushima.

Historically, the Borodino-class battleships established two records; under Russian Admiral Zinovy Rozhestvensky riding in his flagship, Knyaz Suvorov, he led the Russian battleship fleet on the longest coal powered journey ever conducted by a steel battleship fleet during wartime, a voyage of over 18,000 miles (29,000 km) one way. Secondly, although sunk in battle, the Borodinos participated in the only decisive battleship fleet action ever fought. Lastly, what may be the most distinctive item of interest for the future, is the fact that the ships were constructed with tumblehome hulls, seemingly wider at the bottom then narrower towards the top. As a lesson from Tsushima, tumblehome construction was discarded in warship design, as they were regarded as unstable under combat conditions.

Ship	Armament	Armor	Displacement	Propulsion	Service		
Ship	Armament	Armor	Displacement	Propulsion	Laid down	Launched	Fate
Borodino (Бородино)	4 × 12 in	7.64 in (194 mm)	14,150 long tons (14,377 t)	2 screws, 2 triple-expansion steam engines, 18 kn (33 km/h; 21 mph)	23 May 1900	8 September 1901	Sunk during the Battle of Tsushima, 27 May 1905
Imperator Aleksandr III (Император Александр III)	4 × 12 in	7.64 in (194 mm)	14,150 long tons (14,377 t)	2 screws, 2 triple-expansion steam engines, 18 kn (33 km/h; 21 mph)	23 May 1900	3 August 1901	Sunk during the Battle of Tsushima, 27 May 1905
Knyaz Suvorov (Князь Суворов)	4 × 12 in	7.64 in (194 mm)	14,150 long tons (14,377 t)	2 screws, 2 triple-expansion steam engines, 18 kn (33 km/h; 21 mph)	8 September 1901	25 September 1902	Sunk during the Battle of Tsushima, 27 May 1905
Oryol (Орёл)	4 × 12 in	7.64 in (194 mm)	14,150 long tons (14,377 t)	2 screws, 2 triple-expansion steam engines, 18 kn (33 km/h; 21 mph)	1 June 1900	19 July 1902	Scrapped, 1946
Slava (Слава)	4 × 12 in	7.64 in (194 mm)	14,150 long tons (14,377 t)	2 screws, 2 triple-expansion steam engines, 18 kn (33 km/h; 21 mph)	1 November 1902	29 August 1903	Scuttled after the Battle of Moon Sound, 17 October 1917

=== Evstafi class ===
The Evstafi class were the last pre-dreadnought battleships built for the Black Sea Fleet. They were slightly enlarged versions of the Russian battleship Potemkin, with increased armour and more guns. Numerous alterations were made as a result of experience in the Russo-Japanese War of 1904–1905 that seriously delayed the completion of the two ships.

They were the most modern ships in the Black Sea Fleet when World War I began and formed the core of the fleet for the first year of the war, before the newer dreadnoughts entered service. They forced the German battlecruiser SMS Goeben to disengage during the Battle of Cape Sarych shortly after Russia declared war on the Ottoman Empire in late 1914. Both ships covered several bombardments of the Bosporus fortifications in early 1915, including one where they were attacked by Goeben, but they managed to drive her off. Later, Evstafi and Ioann Zlatoust were relegated to secondary roles after the first dreadnought entered service in late 1915, and were subsequently put into reserve in 1918 in Sevastopol.

Both ships were captured when the Germans took the city in May 1918 and were turned over to the Allies after the Armistice in November 1918. Their engines were destroyed in 1919 by the British when they withdrew from Sevastopol to prevent the advancing Bolsheviks from using them against the White Russians. They were abandoned when the Whites evacuated the Crimea in 1920 and were scrapped in 1922–1923.

Ship	Armament	Armor	Displacement	Propulsion	Service		
Ship	Armament	Armor	Displacement	Propulsion	Laid down	Launched	Fate
Evstafi (Евстафий)	4 × 12 in	9 in (229 mm)	12,738 long tons (12,942 t)	2 screws, 2 triple-expansion steam engines, 16 knots (30 km/h; 18 mph)	13 November 1904	3 November 1906	Scrapped, 1922
Ioann Zlatoust (Иоанн Златоуст)	4 × 12 in	9 in (229 mm)	12,738 long tons (12,942 t)	2 screws, 2 triple-expansion steam engines, 16 knots (30 km/h; 18 mph)	13 November 1904	4 May 1906	Scrapped, 1922

=== Andrei Pervozvanny class ===
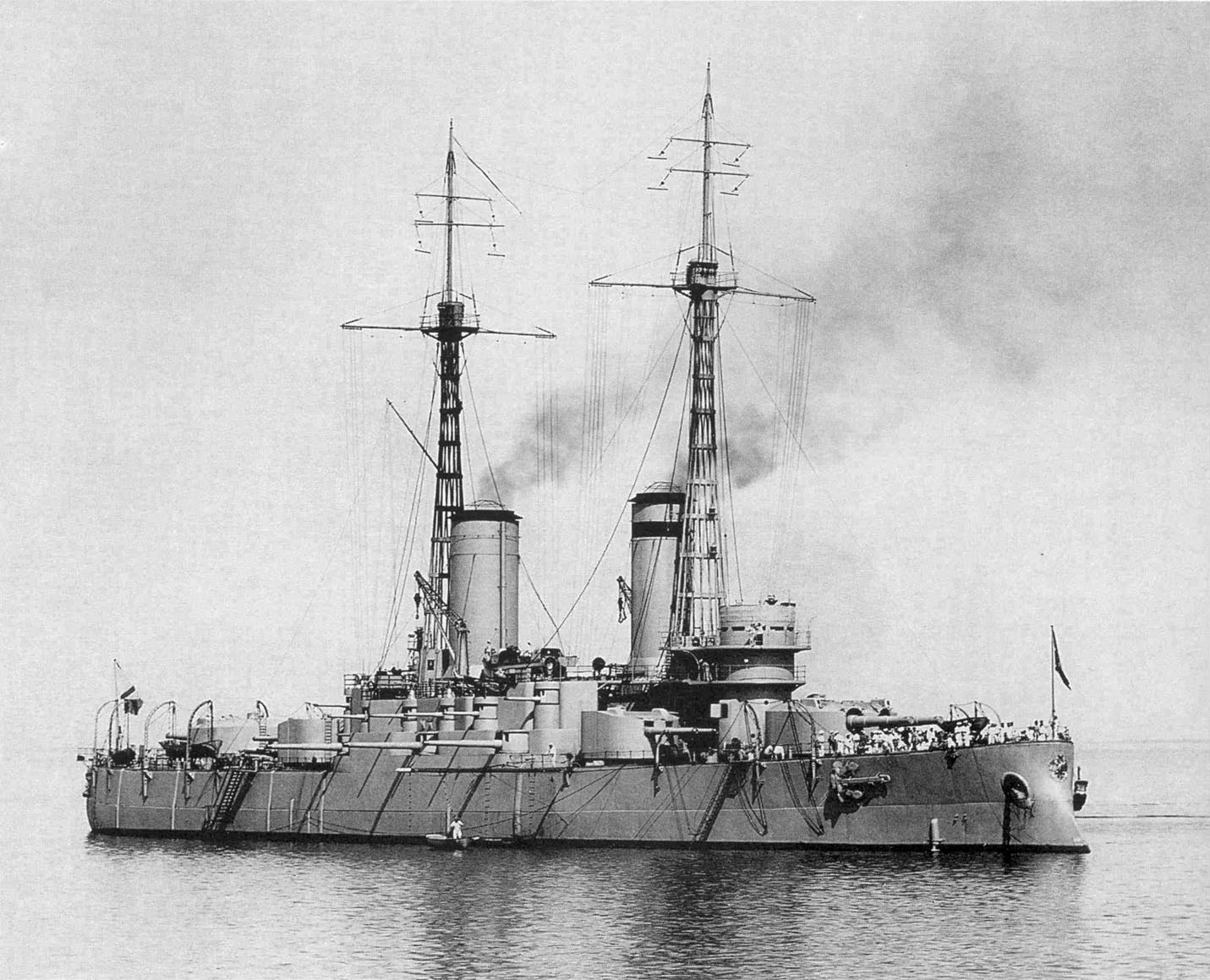
Andrei Pervozvanny at Reval in 1912

The Andrei Pervozvanny class were the last predreadnought battleships built for the Baltic Fleet. They were conceived by the Naval Technical Committee in 1903 as an incremental development of the Borodino-class battleships with increased displacement and heavier secondary armament. Work on the lead ship, Andrei Pervozvanny (Saint Andrew), commenced at the New Admiralty, Saint Petersburg in March 1904; Imperator Pavel I trailed by six months.

The disastrous experiences of the Russo-Japanese War led to countless redesigns, change orders and delays in construction. After the completion of Andrei Pervozvanny its builders identified seventeen distinct stages of her design. Andrei Pervozvanny was launched in October 1906 but subsequent alterations delayed completion until 1911. Almost all of her hull was armored, albeit thinly; redesign and refinement of protective armor continued until 1912. The ship's armament mixed novel quick-firing, long-range, 8-inch guns with obsolescent 12-inch 40-caliber main guns. The Andrei Pervozvanny-class battleships became the only battleships of the Old World fitted with lattice masts, (Note: "The only foreign ships to have them were the U.S.-built Argentinian Rivadavia and Moreno and the Russian Andrei Pervozvanny and Imperator Pavel I." – Morison, Morison and Polmar, p. 172.) which were replaced with conventional masts at the beginning of World War I. The imposing ships, the largest in the Russian Navy until the completion of Gangut, (Note: Largest combatants by displacement until the completion of Gangut-class battleships in 1914. The earlier Rossia, Gromoboi and Rurik surpassed Andrei Pervozvanny in length but had significantly lesser displacement. Prior to the Gangut class, Russian Navy's largest ship by displacement was the non-combatant transport Anadyr at 19,000 tonnes.) were dated from the start: by the time of their sea trials the Royal Navy had already launched the Orion-class super-dreadnoughts.

In the first year of World War I, Andrei Pervozvanny and Imperator Pavel I comprised the battle core of the Baltic Fleet. For most of the war they remained moored in the safety of Sveaborg and Helsingfors. (Note: Suomenlinna (former Sveaborg) is now part of the city of Helsinki (former Helsingfors). Sveaborg and Helsingfors were two separate bases of the Imperial Russian Navy.) Idle, demoralized enlisted men subscribed to Bolshevik ideology and on 16 March [O.S. 3 March] 1917 took control of the ships in a violent mutiny. The battleships survived the Ice Cruise of 1918, and Andrei Pervozvanny later ruthlessly gunned down the Krasnaya Gorka fort mutiny of 1919. After the Kronstadt rebellion the Bolshevik government lost interest in maintaining the battleships, and they were laid up in November–December 1923.

Ship	Armament	Armor	Displacement	Propulsion	Service		
Ship	Armament	Armor	Displacement	Propulsion	Laid down	Launched	Fate
Andrei Pervozvanny (Андрей Первозванный)	4 × 12 in	8.5 in (216 mm)	18,580 long tons (18,878 t)	2 screws, 2 triple-expansion steam engines, 18.5 knots (34.3 km/h; 21.3 mph)	11 May 1905	30 October 1906	Scrapped, 1923
Imperator Pavel I (Император Павел I)	4 × 12 in	8.5 in (216 mm)	18,580 long tons (18,878 t)	2 screws, 2 triple-expansion steam engines, 18.5 knots (34.3 km/h; 21.3 mph)	27 October 1905	7 September 1907	Scrapped, 1923

== Dreadnoughts ==
=== Gangut class ===
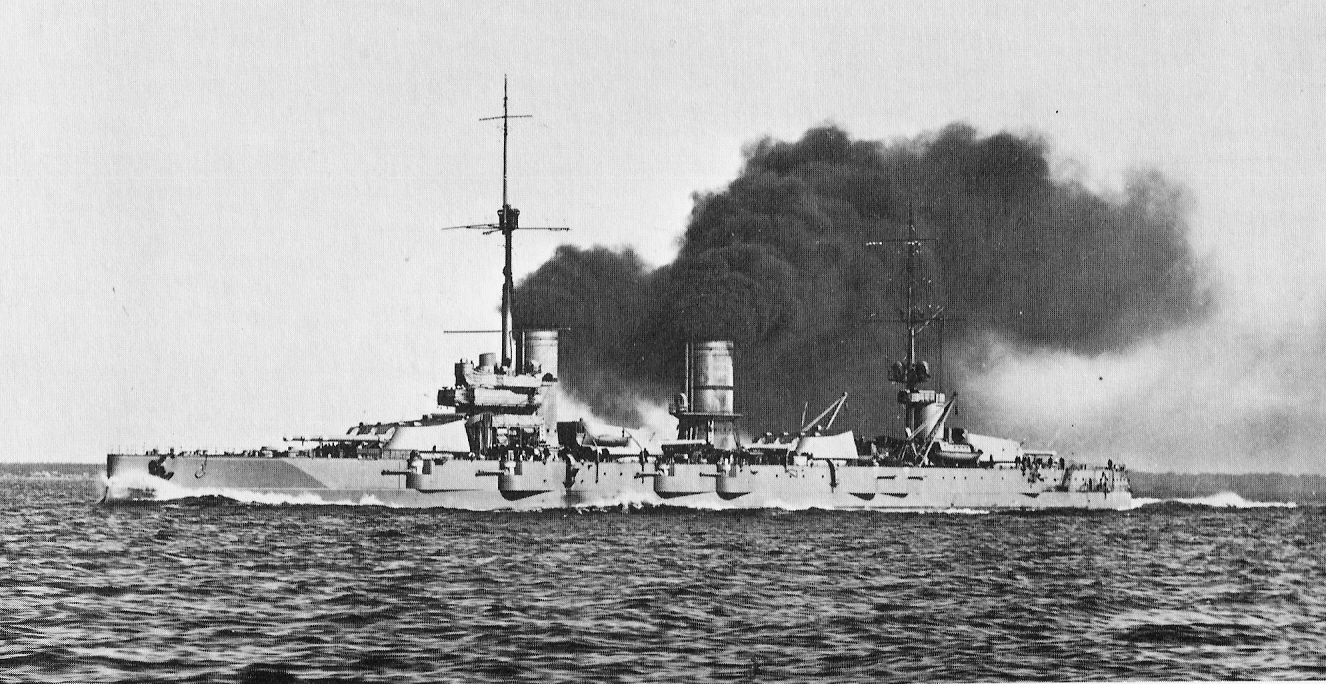
A postcard of the battleship Poltava (1911) at full steam

The Gangut-class battleships were the first dreadnoughts built for the Imperial Russian Navy, begun before World War I. Their role was to defend the mouth of the Gulf of Finland against the Germans, who never tried to enter, so the ships spent their time training and providing cover for minelaying operations. Their crews participated in the general mutiny of the Baltic Fleet after the February Revolution in 1917, and joined the Bolsheviks the following year. The Russians were forced to evacuate their naval base at Helsinki after Finland became independent in December 1917. The Gangut-class ships led the first contingent of ships to Kronstadt even though the Gulf of Finland was still frozen.

All of the dreadnoughts except for Petropavlovsk were laid up in October–November 1918 for lack of manpower. Poltava was severely damaged by a fire while laid up in 1919. Petropavlovsk was retained in commission to defend Kronstadt and Leningrad against the British forces supporting the White Russians although she also helped to suppress a mutiny by the garrison of Fort Krasnaya Gorka in 1919. Her crew, and that of Sevastopol, joined the Kronstadt rebellion of March 1921. After it was bloodily crushed, those ships were given proper 'revolutionary' names. Parizhskaya Kommuna, the former Sevastopol, was modified in 1928 to improve her sea-keeping abilities so that she could be transferred to the Black Sea Fleet which had nothing heavier than a light cruiser available. This proved to be the first of a series of modernizations where each ship of the class was progressively reconstructed and improved. A number of proposals were made in the 1930s to rebuild Frunze, ex-Poltava, to match her sisters or even as a battlecruiser by removing one turret, but these came to naught and she was hulked preparatory to scrapping.

The two ships of the Baltic Fleet did not play a prominent role in the Winter War, but did have their anti-aircraft guns significantly increased before Operation Barbarossa in 1941. However this did not help either ship as they attempted to provide fire support for the defenders of Leningrad. Marat had her bow blown off and Oktyabrskaya Revolyutsiya was badly damaged by multiple bomb hits in September. The former was sunk, but later raised and became a floating battery for the duration of the Siege of Leningrad while the latter spent over a year under repair, although this was lengthened by subsequent bomb hits while in the hands of the shipyard. Both ships bombarded German and Finnish troops so long as they remained within reach, but Oktyabrskaya Revolyutsiya did not venture away from Kronstadt for the duration of the war. Parizhskaya Kommuna remained in Sevastopol until forced to evacuate by advancing German troops. She made one trip to besieged Sevastopol in December 1941 and made a number of bombardments in support of the Kerch Offensive during January–March 1942. She was withdrawn from combat in April as German aerial supremacy had made it too risky to risk such a large target.

Sevastopol and Oktyabrskaya Revolyutsiya remained on the active list after the end of the war although little is known of their activities. Both were reclassified as 'school battleships' (uchebnyi lineinyi korabl) in 1954 and stricken in 1956 after which they were slowly scrapped. There were several plans (Project 27) to reconstruct Petropavlovsk using the bow of Frunze, but they were not accepted and were formally cancelled on 29 June 1948. She was renamed Volkhov in 1950 and served as a stationary training ship until stricken in 1953 and subsequently broken up. Frunze was finally scrapped beginning in 1949.

Ship	Armament	Armor	Displacement	Propulsion	Service		
Ship	Armament	Armor	Displacement	Propulsion	Laid down	Launched	Fate
Gangut (Гангут)	12 × 12 in	225 mm (8.9 in)	24,400 long tons (24,792 t)	4 screws, 4 steam turbines, 24 kn (44 km/h; 28 mph)	16 June 1909	20 October 1911	Stricken, 17 February 1956
Petropavlovsk (Петропавловск)	12 × 12 in	225 mm (8.9 in)	24,400 long tons (24,792 t)	4 screws, 4 steam turbines, 24 kn (44 km/h; 28 mph)	16 June 1909	22 September 1911	Stricken, 4 September 1953
Sevastopol (Севастополь)	12 × 12 in	225 mm (8.9 in)	24,400 long tons (24,792 t)	4 screws, 4 steam turbines, 24 kn (44 km/h; 28 mph)	16 June 1909	10 July 1911	Scrapped beginning in 1949.
Poltava (Russian: Полтава)	12 × 12 in	225 mm (8.9 in)	24,400 long tons (24,792 t)	4 screws, 4 steam turbines, 24 kn (44 km/h; 28 mph)	16 June 1909	23 July 1911	Stricken, 17 February 1956

=== Imperatritsa Mariya class ===
The Imperatritsa Mariya-class ships were the first dreadnoughts built for the Black Sea Fleet. All three ships were built in Nikolayev during World War I. Two ships were delivered in 1915 and saw some combat against ex-German warships that had been 'gifted' to the Ottoman Empire, but the third was not completed until 1917 and saw no combat due to the disorder in the navy after the February Revolution earlier that year.

Imperatritsa Mariya was sunk by a magazine explosion in Sevastopol harbor in 1916. Imperatritsa Ekaterina Velikaya, having been renamed Svobodnaya Rossiya in 1917, was scuttled in Novorossiysk harbor in 1918 to prevent her from being turned over to the Germans as required by the Treaty of Brest-Litovsk. The crew of Volia, as Imperator Aleksander III had been renamed in 1917, voted to turn her over to the Germans. They were only able to make one training cruise before they had to turn her over to the victorious Allies in 1918 as part of the armistice terms. The British took control of her, but turned her over to the White Russians in 1920 who renamed her General Alekseyev. She only had one operable gun turret by this time and she provided some fire support for the Whites, but it was not enough. They were forced to evacuate the Crimea later that year and sailed for Bizerte where she was interned by the French. She was eventually scrapped there during the 1930s to pay her docking fees.

Ship	Armament	Armor	Displacement	Propulsion	Service		
Ship	Armament	Armor	Displacement	Propulsion	Laid down	Launched	Fate
Imperatritsa Mariya (Императрица Мария)	12 × 12 in	10.3 in (262.5 mm)	23,413 long tons (23,789 t)	4 screws, 4 steam turbines, 21 knots (39 km/h; 24 mph)	30 October 1911	19 October 1913	Stricken 21 November 1925
Imperatritsa Ekaterina Velikaya (Императрица Екатерина Великая)	12 × 12 in	10.3 in (262.5 mm)	23,413 long tons (23,789 t)	4 screws, 4 steam turbines, 21 knots (39 km/h; 24 mph)	30 October 1911	6 June 1913	Scuttled, 19 June 1918
Imperator Aleksandr III (Император Александр Третий)	12 × 12 in	10.3 in (262.5 mm)	23,413 long tons (23,789 t)	4 screws, 4 steam turbines, 21 knots (39 km/h; 24 mph)	30 October 1911	15 April 1914	Sold for scrap, 1936

=== Imperator Nikolai I ===
Imperator Nikolai I (Император Николай I or Emperor Nikolai I) was built during World War I for service in the Black Sea. She was designed to counter the multiple Ottoman orders for dreadnoughts which raised the possibility that the Russian dreadnoughts being built for the Black Sea Fleet could be out-numbered. The ship used the same main armament as the preceding Imperatritsa Mariya class, but was larger and more heavily armored. Imperator Nikolai I was launched in 1916, but construction was suspended on 24 October 1917. The Soviets considered completing her in 1923, but rejected the idea. She was towed to Sevastopol in 1927 and scrapped.

Ship	Armament	Armour	Displacement	Propulsion	Service		
Ship	Armament	Armour	Displacement	Propulsion	Laid down	Launched	Fate
Imperator Nikolai I (Император Николай I)	12 × 12 in	10.6 in (270 mm)	31,877 long tons (32,389 t)	4 screws, 4 steam turbines, 21 knots (39 km/h; 24 mph)	28 April 1915	18 October 1916	Scrapped beginning 28 June 1927

=== Sovetsky Soyuz class ===
The Sovetsky Soyuz-class battleships (Project 23, Советский Союз), also known as "Stalin's Republics", were a class of battleships begun by the Soviet Union in the late 1930s but never brought into service. They were designed in response to the battleships being built by Germany. Only four hulls of the sixteen originally planned had been laid down by 1940, when the decision was made to cut the program to only three ships to divert resources to an expanded army rearmament program.

These ships would have rivaled the Imperial Japanese Yamato class in size if any had been completed, although with significantly weaker firepower: 406-millimeter (16 in) guns compared to the 460-millimeter (18.1 in) guns of the Japanese ships. The failure of the Soviet armor plate industry to build cemented armor plates thicker than 230 millimeters (9.1 in) would have negated any advantages from the Sovetsky Soyuz class's thicker armor in combat.

Construction of the first four ships was plagued with difficulties as the Soviet shipbuilding and related industries were not prepared to build such large ships. One battleship, Sovetskaya Belorussiya, was cancelled on 19 October 1940 after serious construction flaws were found. Construction of the other three ships was suspended shortly after Nazi Germany invaded the Soviet Union in June 1941, and never resumed. All three of the surviving hulls were scrapped in the late 1940s.

Ship	Armament	Armor	Displacement	Propulsion	Service		
Ship	Armament	Armor	Displacement	Propulsion	Laid down	Launched	Fate
Sovetsky Soyuz (Советский Союз)	9 × 406 mm (16 in)	420 mm (16.5 in)	65,150 t (64,121 long tons)	4 screws, 4 steam turbines, 28 knots (52 km/h; 32 mph)	15 July 1938	Never	Ordered scrapped, 29 May 1948
Sovetskaya Ukraina (Советская Украина)	9 × 406 mm (16 in)	420 mm (16.5 in)	65,150 t (64,121 long tons)	4 screws, 4 steam turbines, 28 knots (52 km/h; 32 mph)	31 October 1938	Never	Ordered scrapped, 27 March 1947
Sovetskaya Rossiya (Советская Россия)	9 × 406 mm (16 in)	420 mm (16.5 in)	65,150 t (64,121 long tons)	4 screws, 4 steam turbines, 28 knots (52 km/h; 32 mph)	22 July 1940	Never	Ordered scrapped, 27 March 1947
Sovetskaya Belorussiya (Советская Белоруссия)	9 × 406 mm (16 in)	420 mm (16.5 in)	65,150 t (64,121 long tons)	4 screws, 4 steam turbines, 28 knots (52 km/h; 32 mph)	21 December 1939	Never	Cancelled, 19 October 1940

== Foreign-built ships ==
=== Arkhangelsk ===
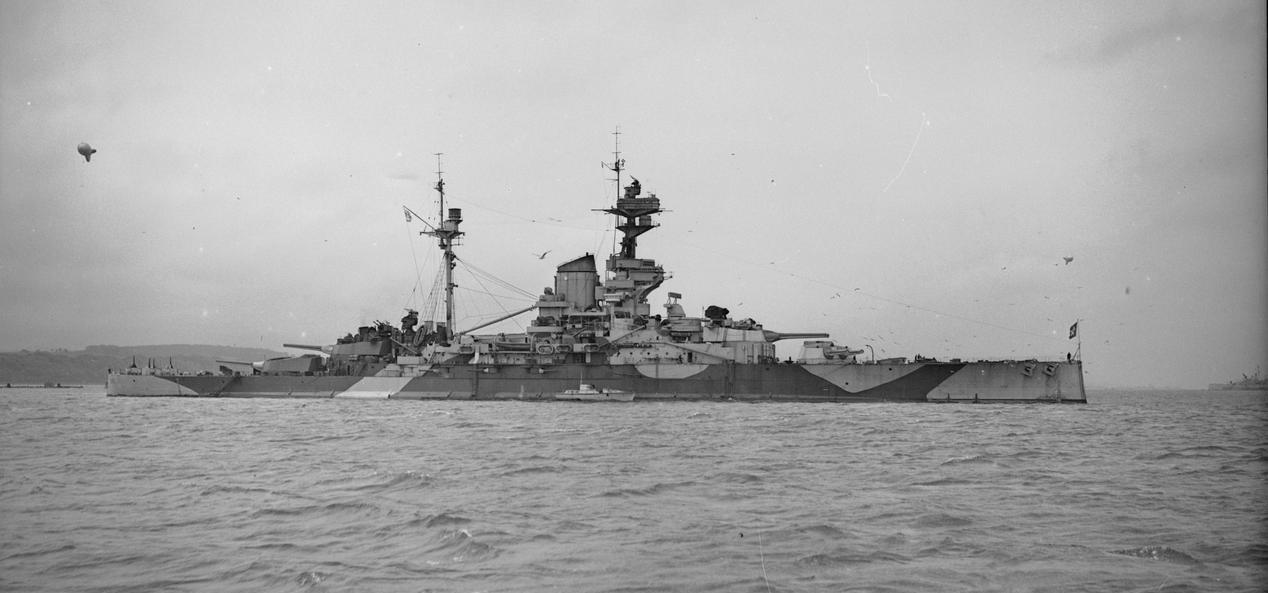
Arkhangelsk in 1944

HMS Royal Sovereign was loaned by the Royal Navy in 1944 in lieu of reparations from Italy. She was assigned to the Northern Fleet with the name of Arkhangelsk and used to escort convoys during the war. Returned to Britain in poor condition in 1949 when the USSR received the Italian battleship Giulio Cesare and sold for scrap.

Ship	Armament	Armour	Displacement	Propulsion	Service		
Ship	Armament	Armour	Displacement	Propulsion	Laid down	Launched	Fate
Arkhangelsk (Архангельск)	8 × 15 in (380 mm)	13 in (330 mm)	29,970 long tons (30,451 t)	4 screws, 4 steam turbines, 21 knots (39 km/h; 24 mph)	15 January 1914	29 April 1915	Scrapped, 1949

=== Novorossiysk ===
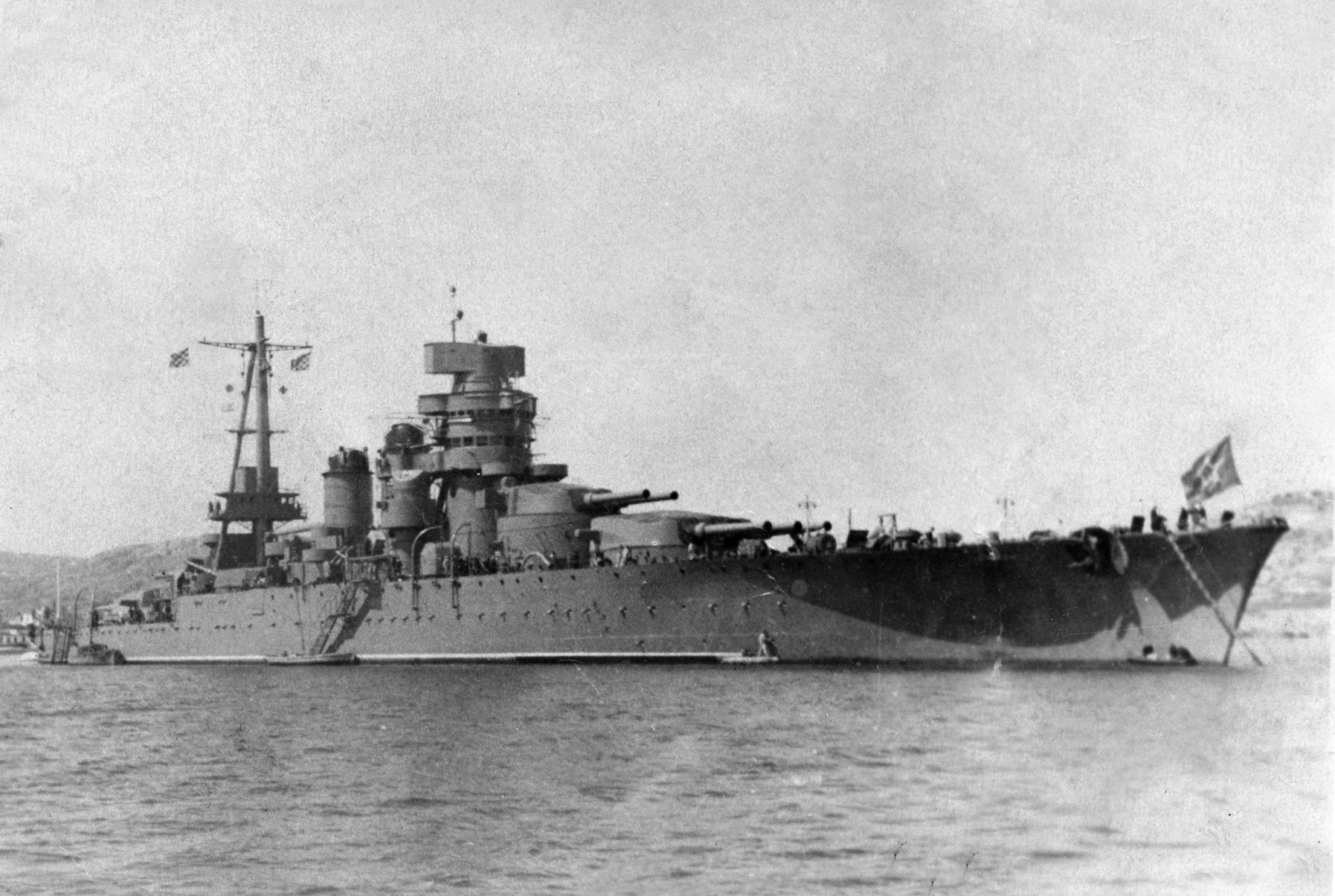
Novorossiysk, Sevastopol, 1950

The Italian battleship Giulio Cesare was turned over to the Soviet Union by Italy in 1948 as war reparations. Renamed Novorossiysk, she was assigned to the Black Sea Fleet. Sunk with 608 deaths following explosion in 1955; probably due to striking a leftover German mine.

Ship	Armament	Armour	Displacement	Propulsion	Service		
Ship	Armament	Armour	Displacement	Propulsion	Laid down	Launched	Fate
Novorossiysk (Новороссийск)	10 × 320 mm (12.6 in)	250 mm	29,100 long tons (29,567 t)	2 screws, 2 steam turbines, 27 knots (50 km/h; 31 mph)	24 June 1910	15 October 1911	Sunk 1955, Scrapped 1957

== See also ==
- List of battleships
