= Battle of Gangut =

1714 battle of the Great Northern War

Coordinates: 59°56′14″N 23°4′54″E

- Part of the Great Northern War
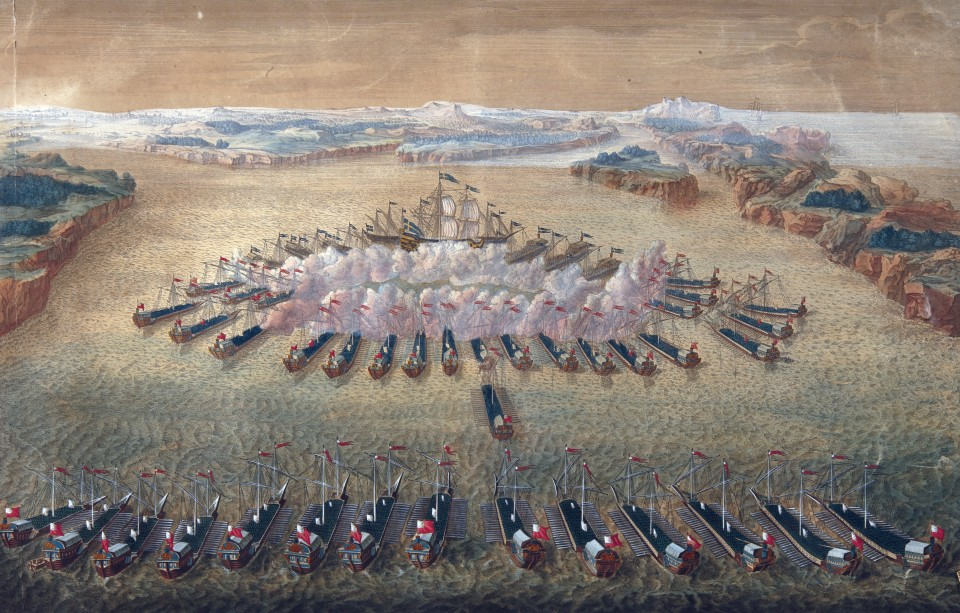
- Battle of Gangut by Maurice Baquoy, Central Naval Museum (1724–1727)
Date	27 July 1714 (O.S.); 7 August 1714 (N.S.)
Location	Hanko Peninsula, southern Finland
Result	Russian victory

Belligerents
Swedish Empire	Tsardom of Russia; Navy

Commanders and leaders
(Sweden) Gustaf Wattrang (Sweden) Nils Ehrenskiöld	Peter I (Tsardom of Russia) Fyodor Apraksin (Tsardom of Russia) Matija Zmajević

Strength
1 pram 6 galleys 2 skerry boats 941–2,400 men	98 galleys, of which 23 engaged, with about 3,900 men aboard

Casualties and losses
All ships captured or sunk 361 killed 580 captured or 400 killed or wounded and 2,000 captured	Russian accounts: 125 killed, 341 wounded Swedish accounts: 3,000 men, 50+ galleys Other accounts: 600 killed or wounded

The Battle of Gangut (Russian: Гангутское сражение; Finnish: Riilahden taistelu; Finland Swedish: Slaget vid Rilax; Swedish: Sjöslaget vid Hangö udd) took place on 27 July^{Jul.}/ 7 August 1714^{Greg.} during the Great Northern War (1700–1721), in the waters of Riilahti Bay, north of the Hanko Peninsula, near the site of the modern-day city of Hanko (Hangö), Finland, between the Swedish Navy and Imperial Russian Navy. It was the first important victory of the Russian fleet in its history. It is commemorated in Russia as one of the Days of Military Honour.

== Name of the battle ==
The name Gangut is a romanization of Гангут, the Russian cyrillization of Hangöudd, the Swedish name for the Hanko Peninsula. Less common names include the Battle of Hangö (Finnish: Hanko) and Battle of Hangöudd (Finnish: Hankoniemi). The battle took place in Rilax Bay, near Riilahti Manor. In Sweden and Finland, it is known as the Battle of Rilax (Finnish: Riilahti). Some sources refer to it as the Battle of Ahvenanmaa, after Åland, which Russia seized after its victory.

== Background ==
The Russian Tsar Peter I had begun his offensive in Finland in the spring of 1713. The Russian armies quickly advanced all the way to Åbo (Turku) on the southwestern coast of Finland, and with Russian victory in the Battle of Storkyro (Isokyrö) on 19 February 1714, left southern Finland fully in Russian control. The Russian governor in Finland, Prince Mikhail Galitzine, with his headquarters in Åbo, was unable to receive support by sea, which was then far more important than land-based support as Swedish battle fleet under Admiral Gustav Wattrang had started blockading the coastal sea route past Hanko Peninsula already on 24 April. While it also blockaded the Russian supply route the blockade also prevented the Russian coastal fleet from reaching Sweden and raiding the Swedish coast. First Russian transports left from Helsingfors (Helsinki) in early May but had to stop east of Hanko (Hangö) to Ekenäs from where the supplies needed to be hauled overland. Russian attempts to provide ships to west of Hanko ended when newly formed Swedish coastal squadron led by Captain Anton Wrangel intercepted the Russian supply ships south of Åbo on 10 May and in one sided engagement sunk most of them while the rest were scattered. Admiral Apraksin's fleet was sent from its base at Kronstadt by the Tsar to open these service lines.

== Arrival at Hanko ==
When the 80 ship strong Russian galley fleet arrived near the peninsula on 29 June 1714 they were met by a strong Swedish naval fleet consisting of 16 ships of the line and 7 smaller ships under the command of Admiral Wattrang. Apraksin decided to withdraw his ships farther away to the eastern side of the peninsula and call for reinforcements while he waited for the further 20 galleys to arrive from Helsingfors where they had been over the winter. The majority of the troops in Åbo were moved according to his request to the peninsula.

A plea for help was also sent to the Tsar, who was with the rest of the Baltic Fleet in Reval (Tallinn). Admiral Apraksin specifically let the Tsar know that he should come personally to lead the attack. A Russian battle fleet of 10 ships of the line and 6 frigates was originally intended to participate in the breakthrough attempt at Hanko but upon inspecting the fleet, the Tsar found it ill-prepared for battle and abandoned the use of the battlefleet. Further, he ordered that the fleet should not engage unless it would have clear superiority in artillery (3:2). Peter I reached the Russian coastal fleet on 20 July.

== Breakthrough ==
The first attempt in breaking through the Swedish lines was made by attempting to pull the galleys over the peninsula. The friction was reduced using ox skins between the ground and the ships. The first galley was successfully pulled over with much trouble, but the second was damaged, and the attempt was subsequently abandoned. However, Admiral Wattrang had been informed of the Russians' attempt, and he sent a small naval detachment consisting of 11 ships led by Schoutbynacht (equivalent of a rear admiral) Nils Ehrenskiöld to intercept the Russians. Swedish efforts forced Russians to abandon their plans few days later.

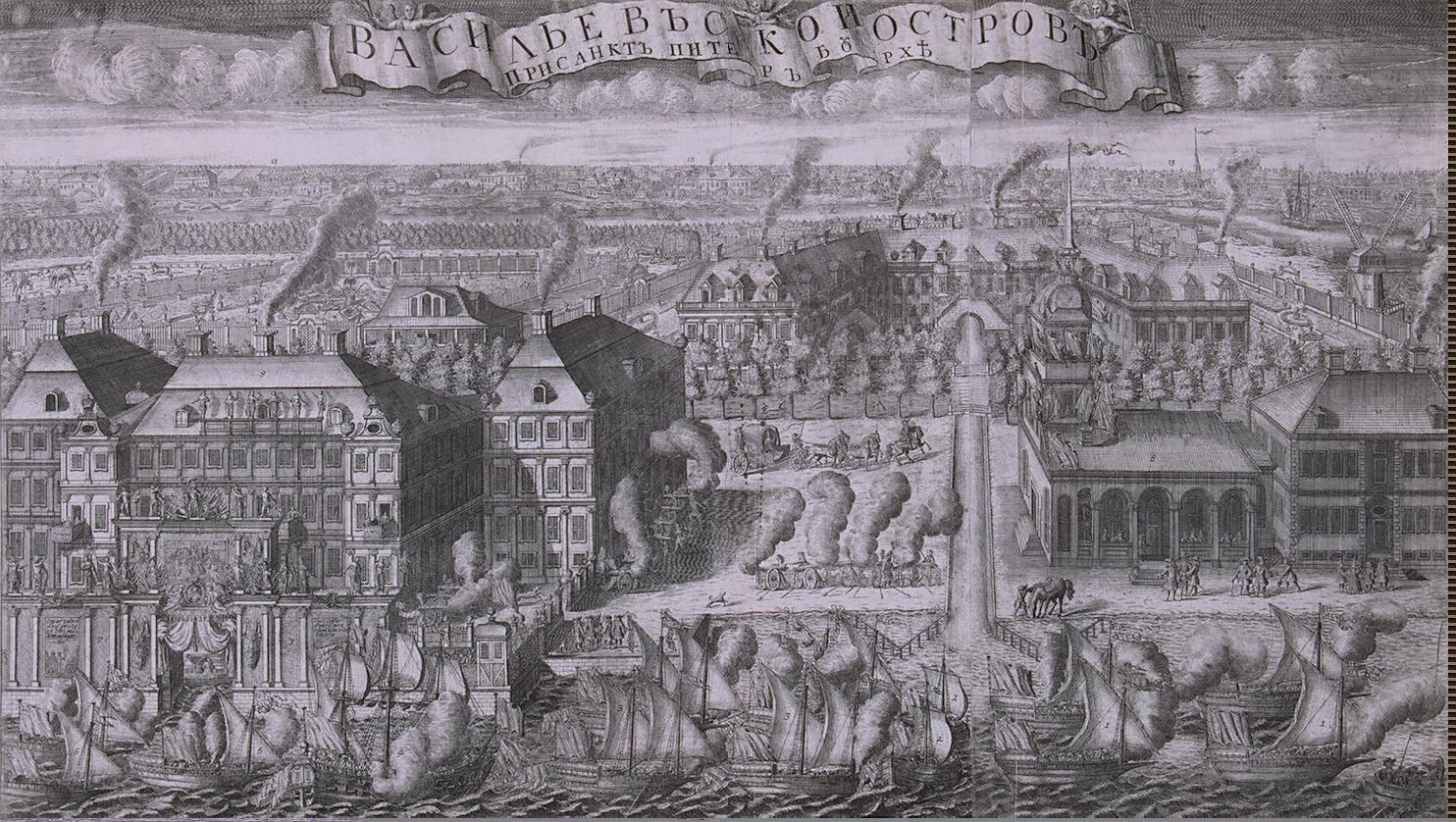
Captured Swedish ships were brought to St Petersburg, as this 1715 etching testifies

Ehrenskiöld's detachment consisted of following ships:

Name	Class	Artillery	Crew (per design)
Elefanten	Gun pram	14 × 12-pounder guns; 3 × 3-pound swivel guns	~ 200
Örnen	Galley	2 × 36-pounder guns; 14 × 3-pound swivel guns	~ 150
Tranan; Gripen	Galley	2 × 18-pounder guns; 14 × 3-pound swivel guns	~ 150
Laxen; Geddan; Valfisken	Galley	2 × 6-pounder guns; 10 × 3-pound swivel guns	< 100
Flundran; Simpan; Mörten	skerry-boat	4-6 × 1–3-pound swivel guns	~ 25

The second attempt by the Russians took advantage of calm weather on the morning of 26 July, the day of Saint Pantaleon. The small Russian galleys were easily maneuvered, whereas it was exceedingly difficult to try to turn the heavy Swedish battleships in such weather. Apraksin initially sent 20 small galleys, which succeeded in running the blockade. As the Swedes started towing their sailing ships further out to sea with rowboats, he sent 15 further galleys along the same route, though since Swedes had moved away from the coast, the second group had to go much further around.

With Wattrang's fleet moved out in an attempt to block the Russian breakthrough, the Russians started their blockade run in the early hours of 27 July along the now clear sea route alongside the cape. Despite frantic Swedish efforts to stop the Russians, only a few of the Swedish ships reached firing range, and even then their artillery fire had very little effect. Only one galley was lost, when it ran aground. Now only Ehrenskiöld's small coastal squadron stood between Russian coastal fleet and the maze-like archipelago of Åland and southwestern Finland.

== Battle ==
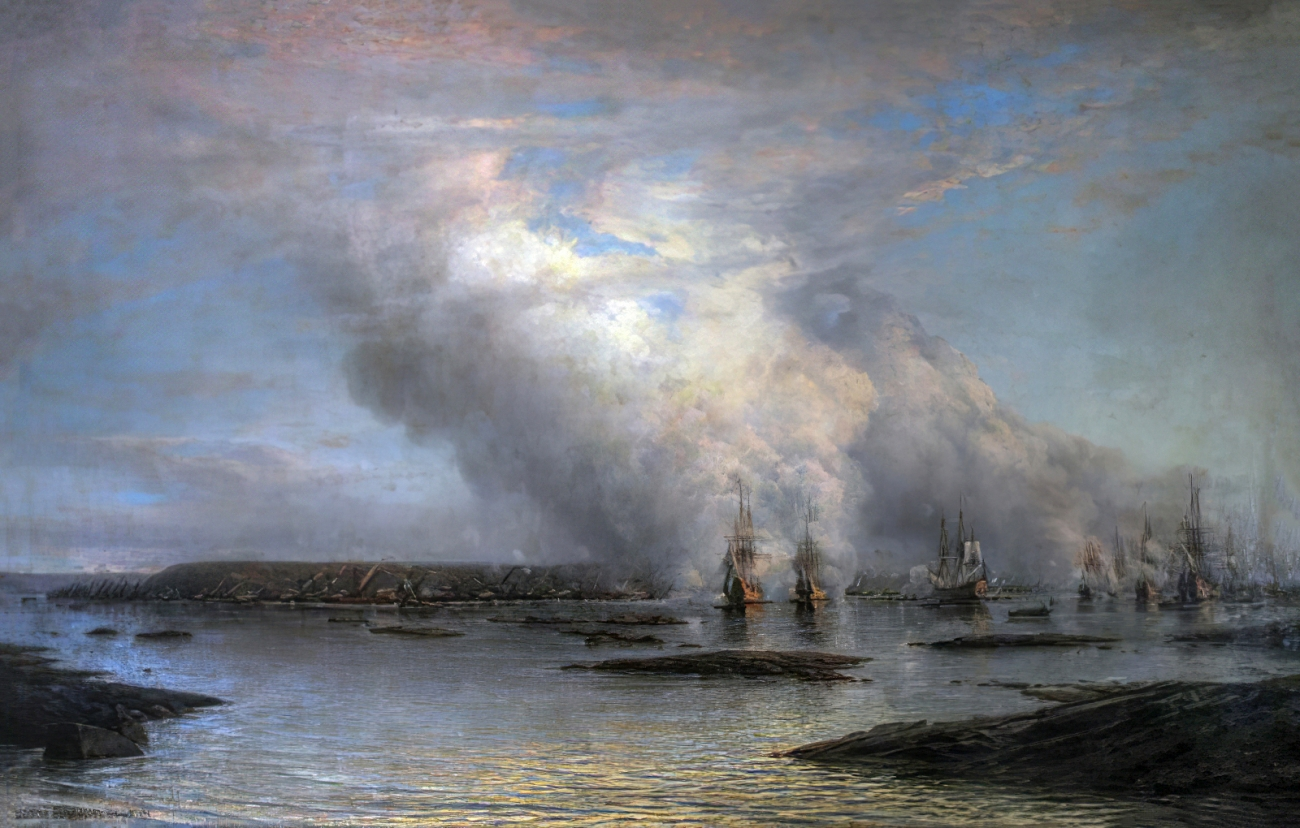
The Battle of Gangut, by Aleksey Bogolyubov

After the breakthrough, Russian galleys gradually pushed Ehrenskiöld's detachment back, causing him to order his vessels to form a defensive line between two islands. One of the skerry-boats was scuttled in order to narrow down the area where the fight would take place with obstacles. The largest Swedish ship, the pram Elefanten, was positioned broadside-on to the approaching Russian vessels. Three galleys were stationed end-on on each side, with the boats behind the line. After Ehrenskiöld refused to surrender, the Russian fleet attacked on 27 July 1714 at 14:00. According to Swedish sources, the Russian galleys, commanded by the Tsar, attacked twice (first with 35 galleys, then with 80 galleys), but were thrown back both times. The third time, when attacking with reinforcements and a combined force of about 95 galleys, the Russians managed to reach the Swedish ships and engage in close quarters combat, where superior Russian numbers could be used to their advantage. Russians managed to board the Swedish galley farthest left in the line, the Tranan, which capsized and sank, creating a hole into the Swedish line. Russian galleys made use of the opening and were quickly able to start boarding the rest of the Swedish ships. Fighting lasted for three hours as the Swedes defended all of their ships. The fighting ended with the capture of Elefanten, where Admiral Ehrenskiöld himself was taken prisoner of war on the deck of his own flagship.

The Swedish description of the battle is not supported by Russian documents of the time and was proven incorrect in many aspects by the Russian historian Prof. Paul A. Krotov in 1996. In his research based on a large number of Russian and foreign archive documents related to the battle and dating back to the 18th century, Krotov demonstrates that the Russian fleet launched only one massive attack on the Swedish position. He states that the number of Russian casualties as reported by the Swedish officer C. G. Tornquist is hugely inflated and increased from 127 men killed and 347 wounded, a figure supported by documentary evidence, to 3,000 dead and 1,600 wounded, which is more than the number of Russian sailors engaged in the fighting. Furthermore, despite the Swedish claim that only 60 Russian galleys made their way to Åbo due to severe damage, it is known from wartime sources that all the galleys sailed there on 1 August 1714 in full force. The overall number of Russian galleys was slightly smaller than reported: 98. Krotov also discovered numerous sources mentioning that over the course of the battle 4 Russian “scampavia” gunboats attacked the Swedish ships from the rear.

Russian galleys were designed differently from Swedish galleys. While carrying generally inferior artillery at two 6-pounder guns per galley, they had a larger crew complement, usually close to 200 men per galley. The Russians substantially outnumbered the Swedish, according to some Swedish sources 15 to one. Russian numbers in the battle were such that there wasn't enough room for all Russian vessels to fight at once, so only 23 vessels engaged.

== Consequences ==
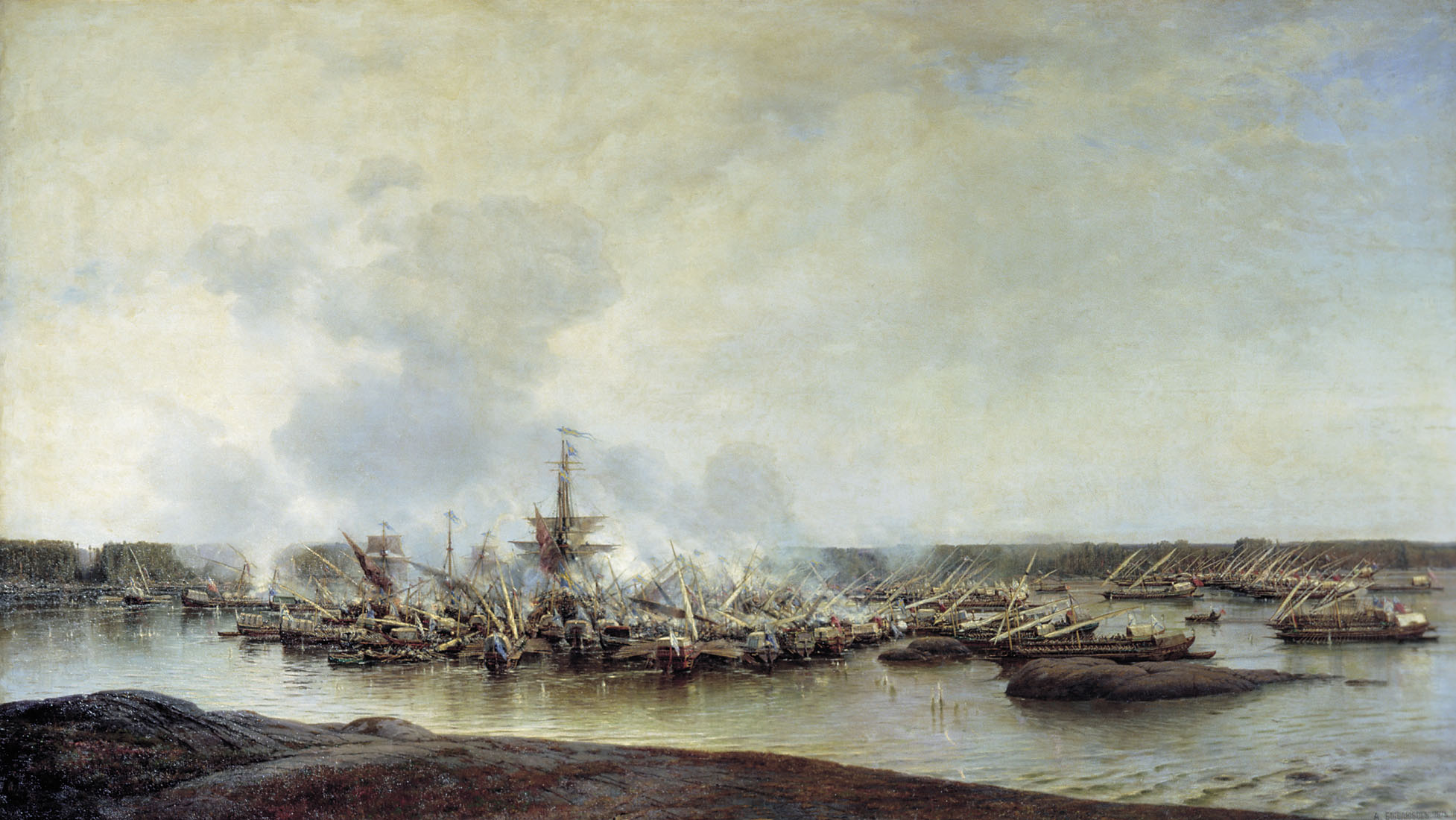
Destroyed ships after the battle.

While the defeat of the small Swedish squadron didn't have much consequences, the fact that over 70 Russian galleys had run the Swedish blockade at Hanko and reached the Archipelago Sea did. The Swedish battlefleet which had been blockading Hanko Peninsula was quickly moved west of Åland to protect Sweden against raids by Russian galleys. This also opened the coastal seaway for the Russian transports. A Russian galley fleet under Admiral Apraksin started from Rilax on 1 August to sail towards Åbo from where he continued already on 5 August towards Åland. By 8 August Apraksin reached the east coast of Åland triggering Swedish withdrawal from the islands. On 13 August whole of Åland was under Russian control. As the Swedish battlefleet prevented Apraksin from reaching Sweden the galleys were diverted to support the Russian army fighting along the coast of Gulf of Bothnia with small squadron plundering and razing the Swedish town of Umeå on 18 September. The Presence of the Russian galley fleet on Bay of Bothnia forced the remnants of the Swedish army in Finland to hastily withdraw to Torne River to avoid getting encircled.

== Legacy ==
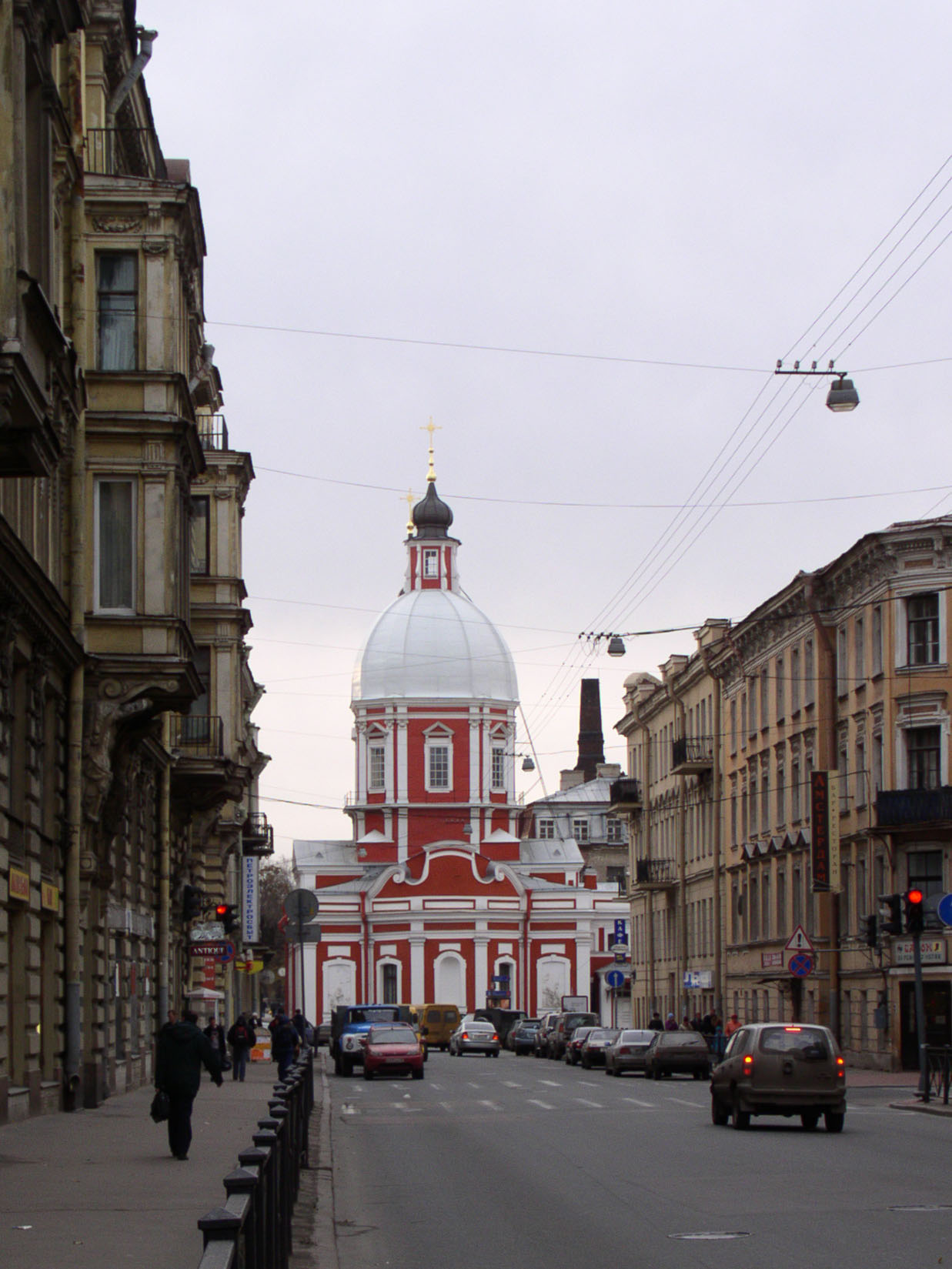
Church of St. Pantaleon in St. Petersburg (1735–39) contains a memorial to the Battle of Gangut.

Russians later embellished the description of the battle of Gangut by reclassifying the oared flat-bottomed gun pram Elefanten into a full sailing frigate.

The battle was the first major victory of the Russian galley fleet, and is occasionally as such compared by Russians with the Battle of Poltava.

The victory is even nowadays celebrated by the Russian Navy; Russia's Navy Day holiday takes place on the last Sunday of July in commemoration of the battle. The Imperial Navy traditionally had one vessel named Gangut, with its first series of Dreadnought battleships named the Gangut class.

The first monument to commemorate the Russian Navy, a wooden cross, was erected on the site in 1869 by Rear Admiral Rimsky-Korsakov, brother of the famous composer, Nikolai Rimsky-Korsakov. The wooden cross was replaced by a more permanent stone cross in 1870 by the order of Tsar Alexander II. The memorial is at Riilahti manor in Bromarv, Raseborg, Finland, which is owned by the Aminoff family.

Finnish minelayer Riilahti (1940) was named after the battle. The battle is known as "battle of Riilahti" in Finland, as Riilahti, where the battle happened, is the bay north from Hanko Peninsula.

== Related battles ==
- Battle of Grengam (1720) – was fought on the same day six years later and marked the end of Swedish supremacy in the Baltic waters;
- Battle of Svensksund (1790) – Sweden's most ambitious attempt to regain supremacy in the Baltic.

== Bibliography ==
- Mattila, Tapani (1983). Meri maamme turvana [Sea safeguarding our country] (in Finnish). Jyväskylä: K. J. Gummerus Osakeyhtiö. ISBN 951-99487-0-8.
- Bodart, Gaston (1908). Militär-historisches Kriegs-Lexikon (1618–1905).
