= Russian destroyer Zabiyaka =

1914 Imperial Russian Navy destroyer

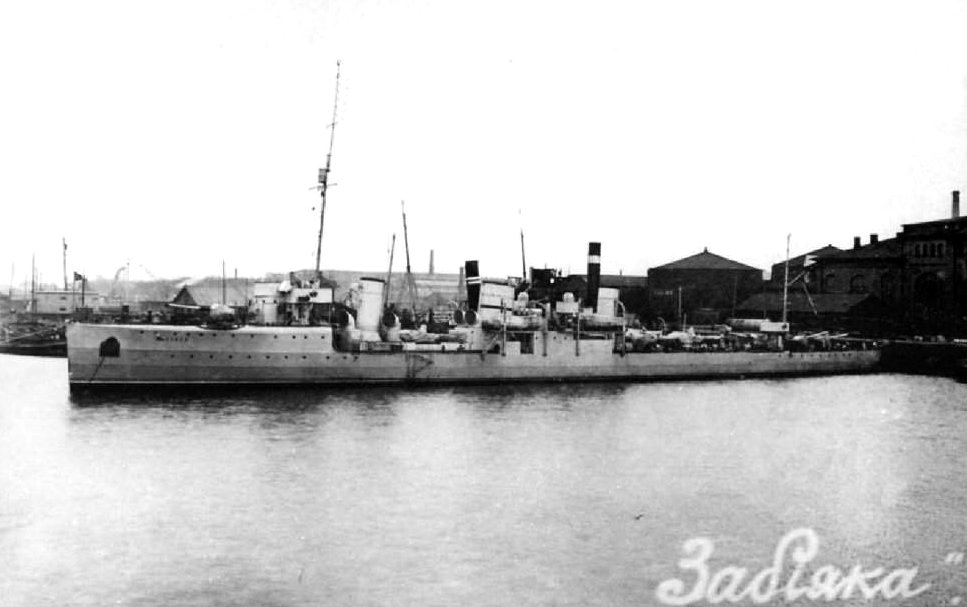
- Profile view of Zabiyaka in 1915–1917

History

Russian Empire
- Name: Zabiyaka
- Builder: Metal Works
- Laid down: November 1913
- Launched: 23 October 1914
- Commissioned: 9 November 1915
- Fate: Joined the Bolsheviks, October 1917

Soviet Union
- Acquired: November 1917
- Renamed: Uritsky, 31 December 1922; Reut, 6 March 1951
- Reclassified: As training ship, 6 March 1951
- Stricken: 17 August 1951
- Fate: Sunk in a nuclear test, 21 September 1955

General characteristics (as built)
- Class & type: Orfey-class destroyer
- Displacement: 1,260 t (1,240 long tons)
- Length: 98 m (321 ft 6 in)
- Beam: 9.34 m (30 ft 8 in)
- Draught: 2.93 m (9 ft 7 in)
- Installed power: 4 Normand boilers; 32,000 PS (24,000 kW)
- Propulsion: 2 shafts, 2 steam turbines
- Speed: 31 knots (57 km/h; 36 mph)
- Range: 1,680 nmi (3,110 km; 1,930 mi) at 21 knots (39 km/h; 24 mph)
- Complement: 150
- Armament: 4 × single 102 mm (4 in) guns; 2 × single 7.62 mm (0.3 in) machine guns; 4 × triple 450 mm (17.7 in) torpedo tubes; 80 × naval mines

Zabiyaka (Russian: Забияка, lit. 'bully') was one of eight Orfey-class destroyers built for the Imperial Russian Navy during World War I. Completed in 1915, she served with the Baltic Fleet and made two raids into the Baltic Sea to attack German shipping or lay minefields before the end of the year. The ship struck a mine at the beginning of 1916 and was under repair until August. Newly repaired, Zabiyaka's stern struck some rocks that badly damaged her and she spent the next 12 months under repair. The ship participated in the Battle of Kassar Wiek during the defense of the West Estonian Archipelago in October 1917 when the Germans invaded them (Operation Albion).

Her crew joined the Bolshevik Red Fleet during the October Revolution of 1917. The ship had to be towed from Helsinki, Grand Duchy of Finland, to Kronstadt in early 1918 during the "Ice Cruise". The destroyer was renamed Uritsky (Урицкий) in 1922 and spent much of the 1920s either in reserve or under repair. She was transferred to the Northern Fleet in 1933 and was still in the Arctic when the Axis powers invaded the Soviet Union in 1941 (Operation Barbarossa). The ship provided naval gunfire support in defense of Soviet forces during Operation Platinum Fox in mid-1941. Uritsky spent most of the war as a convoy escort, although she did rescue survivors from a sunken Soviet destroyer in 1942. The ship was disarmed, renamed Reut and converted into a training ship in 1951. Later that year she was stricken from the navy list in anticipation of her expenditure as a target for nuclear tests, although that did not happen until 1955.

== Design and description ==
The Orfey-class ships were designed as an improved version of the Derzky class. Zabiyaka normally displaced 1,260 metric tons (1,240 long tons) and 1,568 t (1,543 long tons) at full load. She measured 98 meters (321 ft 6 in) long overall with a beam of 9.34 meters (30 ft 8 in), and a draft of 3 meters (9 ft 10 in). The Orfeys were propelled by two Curtiss-AEG-Vulcan steam turbines, each driving one propeller using steam from four Normand boilers. The turbines were designed to produce a total of 32,000 metric horsepower (24,000 kW) for an intended maximum speed of 35 knots (65 km/h; 40 mph) using forced draft. On Zabiyaka's sea trials, she only reached 31.1 knots (57.6 km/h; 35.8 mph). The ships carried enough fuel oil to give them a range of 1,680 nautical miles (3,110 km; 1,930 mi) at 21 knots (39 km/h; 24 mph). Their crew numbered 150.

The Orfey-class ships were originally intended to have an armament of two single 102-millimeter (4-inch) Pattern 1911 Obukhov guns, one gun each on the forecastle and stern, and a dozen 450-millimeter (17.7 in) torpedo tubes in six double mounts. The Naval General Staff changed this to four triple mounts once they became available in 1914. Zabiyaka was completed to this configuration with one triple torpedo mount between the forward funnels and three mounts aft of the rear funnel. She carried three reload torpedoes and was also equipped with a pair of 7.62-millimeter (0.3 in) Maxim machine guns on single mounts. The ships could carry 80 M1912 mines or 50 larger ones. They were also fitted with a Barr and Stroud 2.7-meter (9 ft) rangefinder and two 60-centimeter (24 in) searchlights.

== Construction and career ==
Zabiyaka was laid down at the Metal Works in Petrograd in November 1913 and launched on 23 October 1914. Her sea trials began on 2 October 1915 and she was commissioned on 19 November. Zabiyaka made two sorties into the Baltic Sea that year in unsuccessful attempts to interdict the German supply of high-quality Swedish iron ore either by combat or the laying of minefields. These operations were carried out before the Gulf of Finland was iced over late in the year. Together with the destroyer Novik and her sister ship Pobeditel, Zabiyaka laid 150 mines off the Latvian coast between Ventspils and Lyserort on 16 December. The following day, the German torpedo boat SMS V191 struck one of the mines and began to sink. The light cruiser SMS Bremen attempted to rescue the torpedo boat's survivors, but struck two mines herself and sank. The minefield also claimed the torpedo boat SMS S177 on 23 December.

Zabiyaka was part of another minelaying sortie on 6 January 1916 bound for the coast of Steinort, Germany (modern Gleźnowo, Poland), but her stern struck a mine enroute and was severely damaged. The explosion killed a dozen crewmen and wounded nine more. It flooded several compartments, bent the destroyer's propeller shafts and disabled the steering gear. The mission was cancelled as Novik towed Zabiyaka to Tallinn, Estonian Governorate, for repairs that lasted until August. Based on a battle between Novik and two German destroyers in August 1915, the Naval General Staff had decided to exchange the rearmost torpedo mount for two more four-inch guns, although the modification was not made until Zabiyaka was under repair. The ship was configured with one triple torpedo mount between the forward funnels and two mounts aft of the rear funnel with one gun mounted on the forecastle and three on the stern, aft of the torpedo tubes. A 40-millimeter (1.6 in) anti-aircraft (AA) gun was ordered to be fitted on a platform between the rear torpedo mount and the stern guns on 8 March. While en route to Helsinki on 22 August, Zabiyaka struck some rocks due to a navigational error. The impact broke the rudder, and damaged the right propeller and propeller shaft. The destroyer was under repair until mid-1917. At some point during this repair, the 40 mm AA gun was replaced by a 76-millimeter (3 in) Lender AA gun in 1917.

=== Battle of Kassar Wiek ===
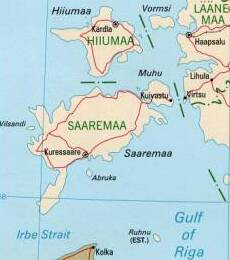
Kassar Wiek is the western area of Moon Sound, between Muhu, Saaremaa, and Hiiumaa Islands

Following the capture of Riga, Governorate of Livonia, in September, the Germans began planning amphibious landings on the islands of the West Estonian Archipelago, codenamed Operation Albion. Their objective was to deny Moon Sound to the Imperial Russian Navy and to capture the islands of Muhu and Saaremaa so that it no longer had bases from which to threaten the supply lines through the Gulf of Riga. The main thrust of the operation was to consist of landings on the northwestern coast of Saaremaa, with follow-on objectives to capture the coast-defense artillery positions that blocked German access into the Gulf of Riga and to seize Muhu before the Russians could reinforce the troops there. Kassar Wiek is the shallow western portion of Moon Sound, between the islands of Saarema, Muhu, and Hiiumaa, that lies north of the Gulf of Riga. Soela Strait separates Saaremaa and Hiiuma. The Germans initiated their attack with landings on the northwestern coast of Saaremaa during the morning of 12 October.

By October, Zabiyaka had been assigned to the 1st Destroyer Division of the Naval Forces of the Gulf of Riga. After inconclusive engagements on 12 and 13 October in which Zabiyaka played little part, the German commander, Commodore Paul Heinrich, decided to bait the Russian destroyers into venturing towards the western entrance to the strait. He positioned the battleship Kaiser out of sight of any Russian forces, but where it could command the length of the strait, using land-based observers. Rear Admiral Mikhail Bakhirev, commander of the Russian naval forces in the Gulf, anticipated another attempt to force the entrance on 14 October and positioned four destroyers, including Zabiyaka, her sisters Grom and Pobeditel, half-sister Konstantin and the gunboat Khrabry at the east end of the strait where they could quickly react to the Germans. They sat there at anchor throughout the morning waiting for the Germans to move, but Heinrich waited until midday when all of his ships were ready. He ordered Kaiser to fire at the anchored ships. The first salvo caught the Russians by surprise and one shell from the second or third salvo hit Grom about 1155 and detonated beneath her. The explosion severed the main and auxiliary steam lines between the boilers and turbines, immobilizing the destroyer. Khabry moved to assist the damaged destroyer and to tow Grom to safety, while the other destroyers moved out of range of Kaiser's guns, laying several smoke screens that did little to protect Grom and Khabry.

Once the German destroyers and torpedo boats were through the strait, they split into two forces in an attempt to envelop the Russian ships as they formed a line east of Khabry and Grom. They opened fire at ranges of 11,000–12,000 yards (10,000–11,000 m) around 1321, outside the range of the German guns, with little effect. The Russian destroyers then turned northeast, presenting their sterns to the oncoming Germans and a running battle began at a range of 10,400 yards (9,500 m). All of the Russian ships, including Grom and Khabry engaged the southern group of German ships, slightly damaging the destroyer G103. The return fire was heavy and Zabiyaka was hit once in the stern, damaging one gun, killing five men and wounding four more. The Russian destroyers then turned east for a short time before turning around so Konstantin could lay another smoke screen. This caused the Germans to cease fire, although Zabiyaka was near-missed and Pobeditel was slightly damaged as they moved back towards Grom and Khabry. The towline broke at 1345 as the destroyers passed by and Pobeditel was blamed as she was thought to have come too close to Khabry and its wake overstressed the towline. Khabry was unable to re-establish the tow and she was ordered to abandon the sinking Grom and follow the destroyers as they retreated to the east. The Germans boarded Grom and captured her mine charts and logbook; the destroyer B98 began towing the burning ship, but she sank under tow at about 1510. The surviving Russian destroyers were reinforced by seven destroyers, including Novik and her half-sister Samson around 1520, Rear-Admiral G. K. Stark, commander of destroyers in the Gulf of Riga, declined to attack the German ships, and decided to bombard them instead at long range around 1535. The Russian guns were accurate, but no hits were made before visibility worsened as dusk approached. During the battle Zabiyaka fired 80 shells.

=== Interwar activities ===
The destroyer returned to Helsinki for repairs and her crew joined the Bolsheviks. They sailed the ship to Petrograd, arrived there on 25 October [N.S. 7 November] 1917, supported the October Revolution, and helped to suppress the Kerensky–Krasnov uprising by 31 October [N.S. 13 November] 1917. Zabiyaka returned to Helsinki before the Gulf of Finland iced over. She was icebound in Helsinki harbor when the Germans decided to intervene in the Finnish Civil War in April 1918. Imperial German troops soon threatened Helsinki, and the Baltic Fleet received orders to evacuate the port. Zabiyaka formed part of the last echelon to depart before the Germans gained control of the city; she had to be towed to Kronstadt from 10 to 16 April 1918 in the "Ice Cruise". She was assigned to the Naval Forces of the Neva and Lake Ladoga on 16 May. The ship, reduced to reserve in October 1918, was reactivated on 10 December 1919. Zabiyaka underwent a refit from June 1920 to January 1922, although she was assigned to the Baltic Fleet on 21 April 1921. The ship was renamed Uritsky on 31 December 1922 in honour of Moisei Uritsky (1873-1918), and underwent major repairs from 23 July 1923 to 3 September 1924, which included enclosing the bridge, and again from 26 October 1927 to 2 September 1929.

The ship was equipped with ten 165-kilogram (364 lb) B-1 and fifteen 41-kilogram (90 lb) M-1 depth charges sometime in 1933. Uritsky had her masts and armament removed in preparation for her voyage through the newly built White Sea Canal in May–June 1933. They were re-installed by 5 August when the ship was assigned to the Northern Flotilla (later the Northern Fleet). She was based in Polyarny, Murmansk, from November 1935. Modernisation work on Uritsky took place from 15 October 1938 to 10 March 1941 at the Krasnaya Kuznitsa Shipyard in Arkhangelsk. This included the installation of a tripod mast, and the addition of a 37-millimeter (1.5 in) 70-K AA gun.

=== World War II ===
Although the Axis powers had invaded the Soviet Union on 22 June 1941, the Germans could not begin Operation Platinum Fox until Finland declared war on 26 June as they had to move through Finland to begin their drive on the Arctic port of Murmansk. They launched their offensive on 29 June and were able to occupy the base of the Rybachy Peninsula that same day. Further progress was blocked by reinforcements and naval gunfire support delivered by Uritsky and her half-sister Valerian Kuybyshev on 30 June. Attacks by Junkers Ju 87 Stuka dive bombers of the Fourth Group of Demonstration Wing 1 (IV. Gruppe/Lehrgeschwader 1) on the Soviet ships over the next several days were unsuccessful. In late August, the ship helped to escort the first British supply convoy to the Soviet Union to through the White Sea to Arkhangelsk. On 15 September she laid 45 mines as part of a minefield near the Rybachy Peninsula. From 11 November to June 1942, she received a lengthy refit that reinforced her hull against the ice, her searchlight was replaced by a pair of 37 mm 70-K AA guns and an additional 76 mm Lender AA gun was installed.

In mid-September, Uritsky formed part of the escort force for Convoys QP 14 and PQ 18. Later that month she began a refit that lasted from 29 September to 8 November. The ship was one of three destroyers sent to rescue survivors of the destroyer Sokrushitelny which had broken her back in a storm on 20 November; she rescued 11 men. Uritsky was refitted between December 1942 and February 1943; a British Type 128 ASDIC set was installed during the refit. At some point during the year, Uritisky's anti-aircraft armament was augmented by two 20-millimeter (0.8 in) Oerlikon guns in single mounts and two 0.50-inch (13 mm) machine guns in a twin-gun mount. Later that month she escorted merchantmen from Convoy JW 53 from the Arctic Ocean through the White Sea. Between March and May, the ship helped to escort American freighters from Arkhangelsk to Murmansk. In late June, she is part of the escort force for Soviet icebreakers moving to the Kara Strait. On 5–7 July, Uritsky was one of four destroyers escorting a British tanker from Arkhangelsk to Murmansk. The ship was refitted from 26 November 1943 to 30 May 1944. At some point during 1944, the two Lender guns and the 0.50 in machine guns were replaced by two more K-70 guns. She was also fitted with a Type 291W search radar.

Uritsky helped to escort a Soviet convoy from Murmansk to Arkhangelsk on 29 June–1 July. The ship was the escort commander for a convoy from the Soviet Arctic coast to Arkhangelsk on 20–31 August. She was part of the escort force between Molotovsk and Murmansk for 17 Allied ships intended to join Convoy RA 61. On 1 December, Uritsky helped to protect a Soviet convoy destined for Murmansk. Four days later, she joined the escorts for the incoming Convoy JW 62. The ship was one of the escorts for Convoy KB 36 from Murmansk to Archangelsk on 15–17 December and then for Convoy BK 41 running in the reverse direction on 3–5 January 1945. On 20 January, Uritsky was part of the close escort for Convoy KP 1 from the Kola Inlet to Liinakhamari, Finland. On 5 February the ship was escorting Convoy BK 2 from Arkhangelsk to Murmansk. Later that month she joined Convoy JW 64 and escorted those ships from the convoy bound for Arkhangelsk. Uritsky was part of the escort for Convoy RA 65 from Arkhangelsk into the Barents Sea from 21 to 24 March. The ship joined the escorts for Convoy JW 66 on 25 April and covered it until it reached Murmansk.

Uritsky was disarmed on 6 March 1951, renamed Reut, and converted into a training ship. On 17 August she was stricken to participate in nuclear testing although the ship was not sunk until 21 September 1955 by a submerged nuclear blast off Novaya Zemlya.

== Bibliography ==
- Apalkov, Yu. V. (1996). Боевые корабли русского флота: 8.1914-10.1917г [Combat Ships of the Russian Fleet: 8.1914-10.1917] (in Russian). ИНТЕК. ISBN 5-7559-0018-3.
- Berezhnoy, S. S. (2002). Крейсера и Миносцы: Справочик [A Guide to Cruisers and Destroyers] (in Russian). Ввоенное Ииздательство. ISBN 5-203-01780-8.
- Budzbon, Przemysław (1985). "Russia". In Gray, Randal (ed.). Conway's All the World's Fighting Ships 1906–1921. Naval Institute Press. pp. 291–325. ISBN 0-85177-245-5.
- Budzbon, Przemysław; Radziemski, Jan & Twardowski, Marek (2022). Warships of the Soviet Fleets 1939–1945. Vol. I: Major Combatants. Naval Institute Press. ISBN 978-1-68247-877-6.
- Greger, René (1972). The Russian Fleet, 1914-1917. Ian Allan. ISBN 0-7110-0255-X.
- Hess, Wilhelm (2021) [1956]. Arctic Front: The Advance of Mountain Corps Norway on Murmansk, 1941. Casemate. ISBN 978-1-61200-972-8.
- O'Hara, Vincent (2017). Clash of Fleets: Naval Battles of the Great War, 1914-18. Naval Institute Press. ISBN 978-1-68247-008-4.
- Platonov, Andrey V. (2002). Энциклопедия советских надводных кораблей 1941–1945 [Encyclopedia of Soviet Surface Ships 1941–1945] (in Russian). Poligon. ISBN 5-89173-178-9.
- Rohwer, Jürgen (2005). Chronology of the War at Sea 1939–1945: The Naval History of World War Two (Third Revised ed.). Naval Institute Press. ISBN 1-59114-119-2.
- Staff, Gary (2009). Battle for the Baltic Islands 1917: Triumph of the Imperial German Navy. Pen and Sword Maritime. ISBN 978-1-84415-787-7.
- Verstyuk, Anatoly & Gordeyev, Stanislav (2006). Корабли Минных дивизий. От "Новика" до "Гогланда" [Torpedo Division Ships: From Novik to Gogland] (in Russian). Voennaya Kniga. ISBN 5-902863-10-4.
