= Russian destroyer Pobeditel =

Russian Imperial Navy destroyer

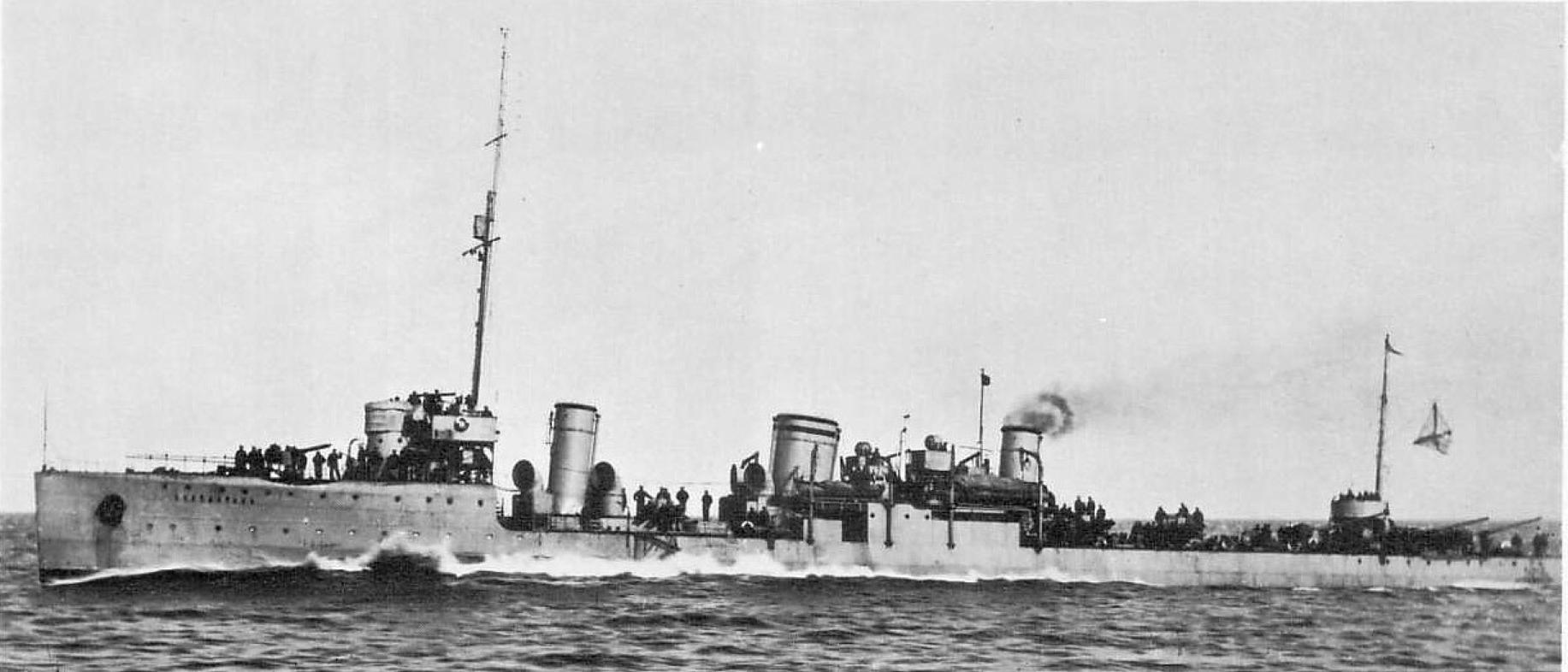

History

Russian Empire
- Name: Pobeditel
- Builder: Metal Works, Saint Petersburg
- Laid down: November 1913
- Launched: 23 October 1914
- Commissioned: 25 October 1915
- Fate: Joined the Bolsheviks, October 1917

Soviet Union
- Acquired: October 1917
- Renamed: Volodarsky, 31 December 1922
- Fate: Sunk by mine, 28 August 1941

General characteristics (as built)
- Class & type: Orfey-class destroyer
- Displacement: 1,260 t (1,240 long tons)
- Length: 98 m (321 ft 6 in)
- Beam: 9.3 m (30 ft 6 in)
- Draught: 3 m (9 ft 10 in)
- Installed power: 4 Normand boilers; 32,000 PS (24,000 kW)
- Propulsion: 2 shafts, 2 steam turbines
- Speed: 31 knots (57 km/h; 36 mph)
- Range: 1,250 nmi (2,320 km; 1,440 mi) at 16 knots (30 km/h; 18 mph)
- Complement: 150
- Armament: 4 × single 102 mm (4 in) guns; 4 × triple 450 mm (17.7 in) torpedo tubes; 80 × naval mines

Pobeditel (Russian: Победитель, lit. 'Victor') was one of eight Orfey-class destroyers built for the Russian Imperial Navy during World War I. Completed in 1915, she served with the Baltic Fleet and participated in raids into the Baltic Sea in 1915 and 1916 to attack German shipping or lay minefields before the Baltic iced over. The ship participated in the Battle of Kassar Wiek in October 1917 when the Germans invaded the West Estonian Archipelago (Operation Albion). Her crew joined the Bolshevik Red Fleet during the October Revolution of 1917. The ship had to be towed from Helsinki, Grand Duchy of Finland, to Kronstadt in early 1918 during the "Ice Cruise".

The destroyer was renamed Volodarsky (Володарский) in 1922 and spent much of the 1920s either in reserve or under repair. She played a minor role during the Winter War of 1939–1940. When the Axis powers invaded the Soviet Union in June 1941 (Operation Barbarossa), the ship participated in the early stages of the Gulf of Riga campaign. Volodarsky was part of the rear guard during the Soviet evacuation of Tallinn, Estonia, and sank with the loss of all hands after striking a mine on 28 August.

== Design and description ==
The Orfey-class ships were designed as an improved version of the Derzky class. Pobeditel normally displaced 1,260 metric tons (1,240 long tons) and 1,568 t (1,543 long tons) at full load. She measured 98 meters (321 ft 6 in) long overall with a beam of 9.34 meters (30 ft 8 in), and a draft of 3 meters (9 ft 10 in). The Orfeys were propelled by two Curtiss-AEG-Vulcan steam turbines, each driving one propeller using steam from four Normand boilers. The turbines were designed to produce a total of 32,000 metric horsepower (24,000 kW) for an intended maximum speed of 35 knots (65 km/h; 40 mph) using forced draft. On Pobeditel's sea trials, she only reached 31.5 knots (58.3 km/h; 36.2 mph). The ships carried enough fuel oil to give them a range of 1,680 nautical miles (3,110 km; 1,930 mi) at 21 knots (39 km/h; 24 mph). Their crew numbered 150.

The Orfey-class ships were originally intended to have an armament of two single 102-millimeter (four-inch) Pattern 1911 Obukhov guns, one gun each on the forecastle and stern, and a dozen 450-millimeter (17.7 in) torpedo tubes in six double mounts. The Naval General Staff changed this to four triple mounts once they became available in 1914. Pobeditel was completed to this configuration with one triple torpedo mount between the forward funnels and three mounts aft of the rear funnel. She carried three reload torpedoes and was also equipped with a pair of 7.62-millimeter (0.3 in) Maxim machine guns on single mounts. The ships could carry 80 M1912 naval mines or 50 larger ones. They were also fitted with a 2.7-meter (9 ft) Barr and Stroud rangefinder and two 60-centimeter (24 in) searchlights.

== Construction and career ==
Pobeditel was laid down at the Metal Works in Petrograd in November 1913 and launched on 23 October 1914. The ship was towed to Helsinki for fitting out. Her sea trials began on 29 August and she was commissioned on 25 October 1915. Pobeditel made two sorties into the Baltic Sea that year in unsuccessful attempts to interdict the German supply of high-quality Swedish iron ore either by combat or the laying of minefields. These operations were carried out before the Gulf of Finland was iced over late in the year. During the second of these, Pobeditel, together with the destroyer Novik and her sister ship Zabiyaka, laid 150 mines off the Latvian coast between Ventspils and Lyserort on 16 December. The following day, the German torpedo boat SMS V191 struck one of the mines and began to sink. The light cruiser SMS Bremen attempted to rescue the torpedo boat's survivors, but struck two mines herself and sank. The minefield also claimed the torpedo boat SMS S177 on 23 December.

Based on a battle between the destroyer Novik and two German destroyers in August 1915, the Naval General Staff decided to exchange the rearmost torpedo mount for two more four-inch guns, although the modification was not made until Pobeditel was refitting in early 1916. Both of these guns were mounted on the stern, aft of the torpedo tubes. The final configuration of the Orfeys' torpedo suite was one mount between the forward funnels and two mounts aft of the rear funnel. A 40-millimeter (1.6 in) anti-aircraft (AA) gun was ordered to be fitted on a platform between the rear torpedo mount and the stern guns on 8 March.

During 1916, Pobeditel made nine sorties into the Baltic to either lay mines or attack German convoys. During one of these missions on the night of 13 June 1916, she led her sister Grom and her half-sister Novik in search of German iron ore convoys sailing along the Swedish coast. They found a convoy of ten freighters escorted by four auxiliary patrol boats near Häfringe Island. The freighters fled for Swedish waters while the escorts turned to engage the Russians. The Russians sank the auxiliary cruiser Hermann, even though they refused to close the escorts believing them to be far stronger than they actually were, but the freighters escaped and no other damage was inflicted. Another of these was on the night of 29/30 June when Pobeditel and her sisters Grom and Orfey were searching for a German convoy off the Swedish coast near Bråviken in thick fog. They encountered a group of eight German destroyers and retreated back towards the armored cruiser Gromoboi and the light cruiser Diana. The Germans pursued the destroyers until they spotted the cruisers and attacked with torpedoes. All of them missed and both sides disengaged without suffering any casualties. The ship was part of a force of five destroyers that laid 200 mines off the coast of Steinort, Germany (modern Gleźnowo, Poland), on the night of 18/19 October. The merchantman SS General Kutuzov that the Germans had salvaged in Ventspils, Latvia, was sunk by one of those mines a few days later. The minesweeper T 64 sank while clearing the minefield. While undergoing a refit in early 1917, the ship had her forecastle strengthened and a 63-millimeter (2.5 in) AA gun aft of the stern guns replaced her 40 mm AA gun.

=== Battle of Kassar Wiek ===
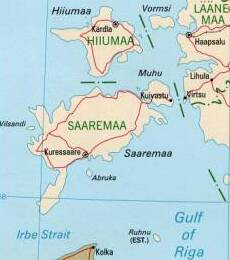
Kassar Wiek is the western area of Moon Sound, between Muhu, Saaremaa, and Hiiumaa Islands

Following the capture of Riga, Governorate of Livonia, in September, the Germans began planning amphibious landings on the islands of the West Estonian Archipelago, codenamed Operation Albion. Their objective was to deny Moon Sound to the Imperial Russian Navy and to capture the islands of Muhu and Saaremaa so that it no longer had bases from which to threaten the supply lines through the Gulf of Riga. The main thrust of the operation was to consist of landings on the northwestern coast of Saaremaa, with follow-on objectives to capture the coast-defense artillery positions that blocked German access into the Gulf of Riga and to seize Muhu before the Russians could reinforce the troops there. Kassar Wiek is the shallow western portion of Moon Sound, between the islands of Saarema, Muhu, and Hiiumaa, that lies north of the Gulf of Riga. Soela Strait separates Saaremaa and Hiiuma. The Germans initiated their attack with landings on the northwestern coast of Saaremaa during the morning of 12 October.

The ship participated in Operation Albion in October. The Russian fleet in the Gulf of Riga was attempting to defend Soela Strait from an attempt by the German Baltic Fleet to break through it and trap Russian forces on Saaremaa Island. After inconclusive engagements on 12 and 13 October, the German commander, Commodore Paul Heinrich, decided to bait the Russian destroyers into venturing towards the western entrance to the strait. He positioned the dreadnought battleship Kaiser out of sight of any Russian forces, but where it could command the length of the strait. Rear Admiral Mikhail Bakhirev, commander of the Russian naval forces in the Gulf of Riga, anticipated another attempt to force the entrance on 14 October and positioned four destroyers, including Pobeditel, her sisters Zabiyaka and Grom, half-sister Konstantin and the gunboat Khrabry at the east end of the strait where they could quickly react to the Germans. They sat there at anchor throughout the morning waiting for the Germans to move, but Heinrich waited until midday when all of his ships were ready. He ordered Kaiser to fire at the anchored ships around 1145. The first salvo caught the Russians by surprise and one shell from the second or third salvo hit Grom about 1155 and detonated beneath her. The explosion severed the main and auxiliary steam lines between the boilers and turbines, immobilizing the destroyer. Khabry moved to assist the damaged destroyer and to tow Grom to safety, while the other destroyers moved out of range of Kaiser's guns, laying several smoke screens that did little to protect Grom and Khabry.

Once the German destroyers and torpedo boats were through the strait, they split into two forces in an attempt to envelop the Russian ships as they formed a line east of Khabry and Grom. They opened fire at ranges of 11,000–12,000 yards (10,000–11,000 m) around 1321, outside the range of the German guns, with little effect. The Russian destroyers then turned northeast, presenting their sterns to the oncoming Germans and a running battle began at a range of 10,400 yards (9,500 m). All of the Russian ships, including Grom and Khabry engaged the southern group of German ships, slightly damaging the destroyer SMS G103. The return fire was heavy and Zabiyaka was hit once in the stern. The Russian destroyers then turned east for a short time before turning around so Konstantin could lay another smoke screen. This caused the Germans to cease fire, although Pobeditel was slightly damaged in the stern and Zabiyaka was near-missed as they moved back towards Grom and Khabry. The towline broke at 1345 as the destroyers passed by and Pobeditel was blamed as she was thought to have come too close to Khabry and her wake overstressed the towline. Khabry was unable to re-establish the tow; she was ordered to abandon the sinking Grom and follow the destroyers as they retreated to the east. The Germans boarded Grom and captured her mine charts and logbook; the destroyer SMS B98 began towing the burning ship, but she sank under tow at about 1510. The surviving Russian destroyers were reinforced by seven destroyers, including Novik and her half-sister Samson around 1520, but Rear-Admiral Stark, commander of destroyers in the Gulf of Riga, declined to attack the German ships. He decided instead to bombard them at long range around 1535. The Russian guns were accurate, but no hits were made before visibility worsened as dusk approached. During the battle Pobeditel fired 400 shells. Afterward, she withdrew to Rohuküla, Estonia, to refuel and to receive emergency repairs.

=== Interwar activities ===
After arriving in Helsinki for more thorough repairs, the ship's crew mutinied and joined the Bolsheviks. They sailed the ship to Petrograd and arrived there on 29 October and helped to suppress the Kerensky–Krasnov uprising. Pobeditel returned to Helsinki before the Gulf of Finland iced over. She was icebound in Helsinki harbor when the Germans decided to intervene in the Finnish Civil War in April 1918. Their troops soon threatened Helsinki and the Baltic Fleet was ordered to evacuate the port. Pobeditel was part of the last echelon to depart before the Germans gained control of the city and had to be towed to Kronstadt from 10 to 16 April 1918 in the "Ice Cruise". The ship was put in long-term storage at Kronstadt in October 1918, but was placed in reserve in November 1919. She was recommissioned on 21 April 1921 and was renamed Volodarsky on 31 December 1922. The ship was refitted in 1923–1924, which included enclosing the bridge. She collided with the destroyer Voykov on 6 September 1929 and her bow was badly damaged. It was repaired using components from her sister Orfey. Volodarsky was equipped with ten 165-kilogram (364 lb) B-1 and fifteen 41-kilogram (90 lb) M-1 depth charges in 1933. The ship visited Gdynia, Poland, in early September 1934 and then began a modernization that lasted through 1937. This included the replacement of the 63.5 mm AA gun by a 76-millimeter (3 in) Lender AA gun, the addition of two 12.7-millimeter (0.50 in) DShK heavy machine guns, and the installation of two 45-millimeter (1.8 in) 21-K AA guns.

=== World War II ===
She unsuccessfully searched for Polish submarines in the Gulf of Finland from 19 to 21 September 1939. After the Winter War began on 30 November, the ship bombarded Finnish coastal-defense positions on and near Saarenpää Island, part of the Beryozovye Islands, in conjunction with other ships, on 9–10 and 18–19 December. The Soviet Navy transferred its 3rd Destroyer Division, consisting of Karl Marx, Volodarsky and her sisters Artem and Engels to its newly acquired base at Hanko, Finland, on 20 March 1940. By the time that the Great Patriotic War began when the Axis Powers invaded the Soviet Union on 22 June 1941, the 3rd Destroyer Division was based in Tallinn. On the night of 22/23 June, Volodarsky, Artem and Karl Marx were some of the minelayers conducting operations at the entrance of the Gulf of Finland. The following day, the same three destroyers were part of the covering force for minelayers laying minefields between Hanko and Osmussuaari. Volodarsky escorted the badly damaged cruiser Maxim Gorky to Tallinn on 24–25 June and then helped to lay another minefield on 26 June before escorting the cruiser to Kronstadt on 27 June. She was one of seven destroyers that escorted the battleship Oktyabrskaya Revolutsiya from Tallinn to Kronstadt on 1 July. On the night of 27/28 August, Volodarsky, Artem and the destroyer Kalinin formed part of the rear guard for the evacuation convoys from Tallinn to Kronstadt. They provided covering fire during the night as the troops loaded onto the transports and then departed. Volodarsky herself did not leave until 1600; she struck a mine of the Juminda barrage at 2350 and sank with the loss of all hands. The ship was struck from the navy list on 10 September 1941.

== Bibliography ==
- Apalkov, Yu. V. (1996). Боевые корабли русского флота: 8.1914-10.1917г [Combat Ships of the Russian Fleet: 8.1914-10.1917] (in Russian). ИНТЕК. ISBN 5-7559-0018-3.
- Berezhnoy, S. S. (2002). Крейсера и Миносцы: Справочик [Cruisers and Destroyers: Reference] (in Russian). Moscow: Ввоенное Ииздательство. ISBN 5-203-01780-8.
- Breyer, Siegfried (1992). Soviet Warship Development: Volume 1: 1917–1937. Conway Maritime Press. ISBN 0-85177-604-3.
- Budzbon, Przemysław (1985). "Russia". In Gray, Randal (ed.). Conway's All the World's Fighting Ships 1906–1921. Naval Institute Press. pp. 291–325. ISBN 0-85177-245-5.
- Budzbon, Przemysław; Radziemski, Jan & Twardowski, Marek (2022). Warships of the Soviet Fleets 1939–1945. Vol. I: Major Combatants. Naval Institute Press. ISBN 978-1-68247-877-6.
- Greger, René (1972). The Russian Fleet, 1914-1917. Ian Allan. ISBN 0-7110-0255-X.
- Halpern, Paul G. (1994). A Naval History of World War I. Annapolis, Maryland: Naval Institute Press. ISBN 0-87021-266-4.
- O'Hara, Vincent (2017). Clash of Fleets: Naval Battles of the Great War, 1914-18. Naval Institute Press. ISBN 978-1-68247-008-4.
- Platonov, Andrey V. (2002). Энциклопедия советских надводных кораблей 1941–1945 [Encyclopedia of Soviet Surface Ships 1941–1945] (in Russian). Poligon. ISBN 5-89173-178-9.
- Rohwer, Jürgen (2005). Chronology of the War at Sea 1939–1945: The Naval History of World War Two (Third Revised ed.). Naval Institute Press. ISBN 1-59114-119-2.
- Staff, Gary (2009). Battle for the Baltic Islands 1917: Triumph of the Imperial German Navy. Pen and Sword Maritime. ISBN 978-1-84415-787-7.
- Verstyuk, Anatoly & Gordeyev, Stanislav (2006). Корабли Минных дивизий. От "Новика" до "Гогланда" [Torpedo Division Ships: From Novik to Gogland] (in Russian). Moscow: Voennaya Kniga. ISBN 5-902863-10-4.
