= Russian destroyer Orfey =

1915 Imperial Russian Navy destroyer

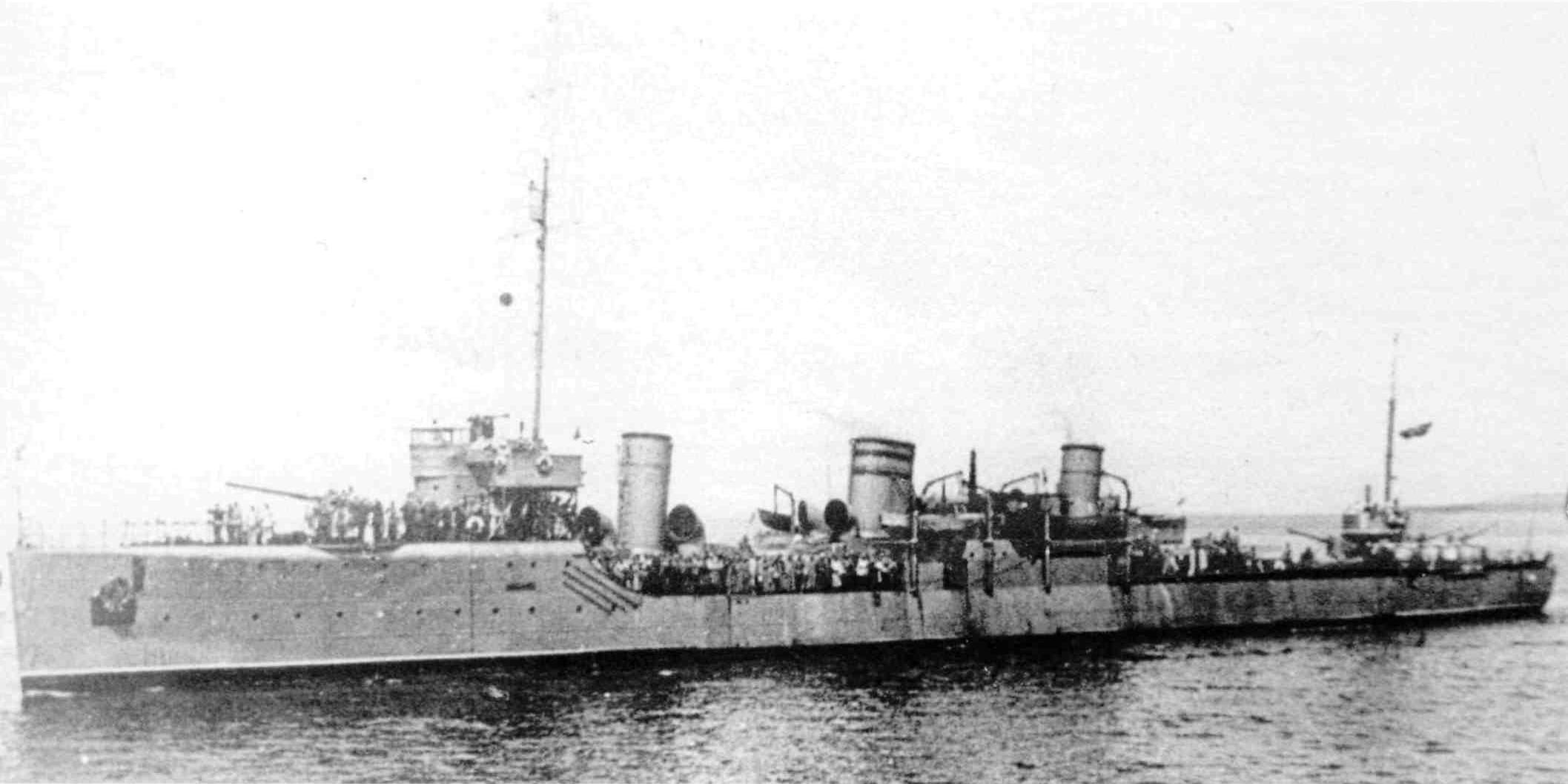
- Sister ship Artem

History

Russian Empire
- Name: Orfey
- Namesake: Orpheus
- Builder: Metal Works, Petrograd
- Laid down: 23 October 1914
- Launched: 15 June 1915
- Commissioned: 4 May 1916

Soviet Union
- Acquired: November 1917
- Fate: Scrapped, 1931

General characteristics (as built)
- Class & type: Orfey-class destroyer
- Displacement: 1,260 t (1,240 long tons)
- Length: 98 m (321 ft 6 in)
- Beam: 9.3 m (30 ft 6 in)
- Draught: 2.98 m (9 ft 9 in)
- Installed power: 4 Normand boilers; 32,000 PS (24,000 kW)
- Propulsion: 2 shafts, 2 steam turbines
- Speed: 31 knots (57 km/h; 36 mph)
- Range: 1,680 nmi (3,110 km; 1,930 mi) at 21 knots (39 km/h; 24 mph)
- Complement: 150
- Armament: 4 × single 102 mm (4 in) guns; 2 × 7.62 mm (0.3 in) machine guns; 3 × triple 450 mm (17.7 in) torpedo tubes; 80 × naval mines

Orfey (Russian: Орфей, lit. 'Orpheus') was the name ship of her class of eight destroyers built for the Imperial Russian Navy during World War I. Completed in 1916, she served with the Baltic Fleet and made seven raids into the Baltic Sea to attack German shipping or lay minefields. The ship ran aground in August; her repairs were completed several months later. Orfey was inactive for most of 1917, but struck a mine in November that crippled her. Her crew joined the Bolsheviks while she was being repaired in 1917. The ship was towed from Helsinki, Grand Duchy of Finland, in April 1918 in what became known as the "Ice Cruise" as the harbor was still iced over. She was placed in reserve later that month and was briefly reactivated in 1921 even though the ship had not been repaired. Orfey was converted into a training ship in 1922 and was scrapped nine years later.

== Design and description ==
The Orfey-class ships were designed as an improved version of the Derzky class. Orfey normally displaced 1,260 metric tons (1,240 long tons) and 1,568 t (1,543 long tons) at full load. She measured 98 meters (321 ft 6 in) long overall with a beam of 9.34 meters (30 ft 8 in), and a draft of 3 meters (9 ft 10 in). The Orfeys were propelled by two Curtiss-AEG-Vulcan steam turbines, each driving one propeller using steam from four Normand boilers. The turbines were designed to produce a total of 32,000 metric horsepower (24,000 kW) for an intended maximum speed of 35 knots (65 km/h; 40 mph) using forced draft. On Orfey's sea trials, she only reached 31.4 knots (58.2 km/h; 36.1 mph). The ships carried enough fuel oil to give them a range of 1,680 nautical miles (3,110 km; 1,930 mi) at 21 knots (39 km/h; 24 mph). Their crew numbered 150.

The Orfey-class ships were originally intended to have an armament of two single 102-millimeter (four-inch) Pattern 1911 Obukhov guns, one gun each on the forecastle and stern, and a dozen 450-millimeter (17.7 in) torpedo tubes in six double mounts. The Naval General Staff changed this to four triple mounts once they became available in 1914. Based on a battle between the destroyer Novik and two German destroyers in August 1915, the Naval General Staff decided to exchange the rearmost torpedo mount for two more four-inch guns, although the modification was not made until the ship was fitting out. Both of these guns were mounted on the stern, aft of the torpedo tubes. The final configuration of the Orfeys' torpedo suite was one mount between the forward funnels and two mounts aft of the rear funnel. Orfey carried three reload torpedoes and was also equipped with a pair of 7.62-millimeter (0.3 in) Maxim machine guns on single mounts. The ships could carry 80 M1912 naval mines or 50 larger ones. They were also fitted with a 2.7-meter (9 ft) Barr and Stroud rangefinder and two 60-centimeter (24 in) searchlights.

== Construction and career ==
Orfey was laid down at the Metal Works in Petrograd on 23 October 1914 and launched on 15 June 1915. The ship was towed to Helsinki for fitting out in November. A 40-millimeter (1.6 in) anti-aircraft (AA) gun was ordered to be fitted on a platform between the rear torpedo mount and the stern guns on 8 March 1916. Her sea trials began on 9 December 1915 and she was commissioned on 4 May 1916. Orfey made seven sorties into the Baltic Sea that year in unsuccessful attempts to interdict the German supply of high-quality Swedish iron ore either by combat or the laying of minefields. These operations were carried out before the Gulf of Finland was iced over late in the year. One of these was on the night of 29/30 June when Orfey and her sister ships Pobeditel and Grom were searching for a German convoy off the Swedish coast near Bråviken in thick fog. They encountered a group of eight German destroyers and retreated back towards the armored cruiser Gromoboi and the light cruiser Diana. The Germans pursued the destroyers until they spotted the cruisers and attacked with torpedoes. All of them missed and both sides disengaged without suffering any casualties.

The ship ran aground on 22 August and flooded several compartments in her hull. Orfey had to be lightened before she could be pulled off the rocks; she was towed to Helsinki for repairs that lasted about a month and a half. The ship was part of a force of five destroyers that laid 200 mines off the coast of Steinort, Germany (modern Gleźnowo, Poland), on the night of 18/19 October. The merchantman SS General Kutuzov that the Germans had salvaged in Ventspils, Latvia, was sunk by one of those mines a few days later. The minesweeper T 64 sank while clearing the minefield. The destroyer was refitted in the winter of 1916–1917 and had her forecastle strengthened. Orfey did not participated in any combat operations in 1917, although she did receive a 76-millimeter (3 in) Lender AA gun that year that was positioned aft of the stern guns. The ship struck a mine in November 1917 that severely damaged her turbines and propeller shafts and had to be towed back to Helsinki.

Her crew joined the Bolsheviks during the October Revolution. She was icebound in Helsinki harbor when the Germans decided to intervene in the Finnish Civil War in April 1918. Their troops soon threatened Helsinki and the Baltic Fleet was ordered to evacuate the port. Orfey was part of the last echelon to depart before the Germans gained control of the city and had to be towed to Kronstadt from 10 to 16 April 1918 in the "Ice Cruise". She was placed in reserve upon her arrival. The ship was briefly recommissioned on 21 April 1921 before she was disarmed and converted into a training ship on 31 May 1922. Part of her bow was removed in late 1929 to be used to repair her sister ship Volodarski whose bow had been damaged in a collision earlier that year. Orfey was stricken on 28 January 1931 and ordered to be scrapped.

== Bibliography ==
- Apalkov, Yu. V. (1996). Боевые корабли русского флота: 8.1914-10.1917г [Combat Ships of the Russian Fleet: 8.1914-10.1917] (in Russian). ИНТЕК. ISBN 5-7559-0018-3.
- Breyer, Siegfried (1992). Soviet Warship Development: Volume 1: 1917–1937. London: Conway Maritime Press. ISBN 0-85177-604-3.
- Budzbon, Przemysław (1985). "Russia". In Gray, Randal (ed.). Conway's All the World's Fighting Ships 1906–1921. Annapolis, Maryland: Naval Institute Press. pp. 291–325. ISBN 0-85177-245-5.
- Greger, René (1972). The Russian Fleet, 1914-1917. Ian Allan. ISBN 0-7110-0255-X.
- Halpern, Paul G. (1994). A Naval History of World War I. Annapolis, Maryland: Naval Institute Press. ISBN 0-87021-266-4.
- Verstyuk, Anatoly & Gordeyev, Stanislav (2006). Корабли Минных дивизий. От "Новика" до "Гогланда" [Torpedo Division Ships: From Novik to Gogland] (in Russian). Moscow: Voennaya Kniga. ISBN 5-902863-10-4.
