= Russian destroyer Grom =

1915 Imperial Russian Navy destroyer

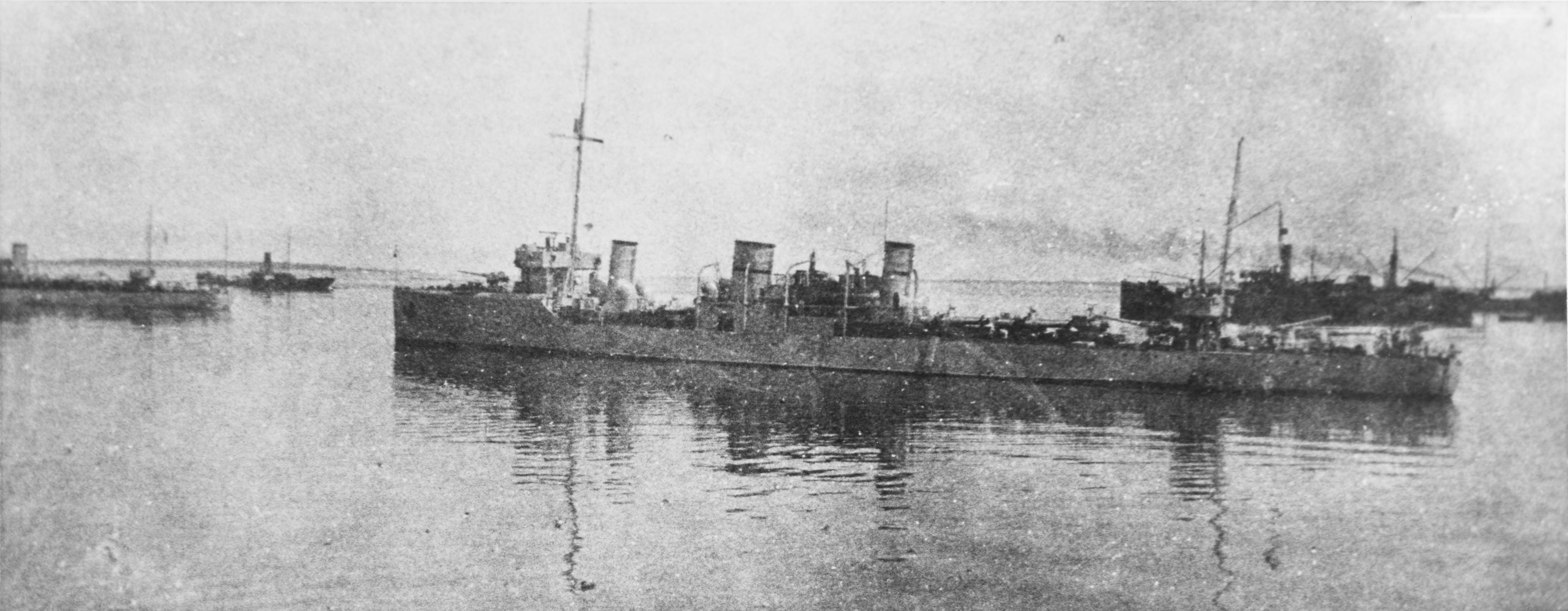
- Grom at anchor, 1917

History

Russian Empire
- Name: Grom
- Builder: Metal Works, Petrograd
- Laid down: November 1913
- Launched: 15 June 1915
- Completed: 4 May 1916
- Fate: Sunk during Operation Albion, 14 October 1917

General characteristics (as built)
- Class & type: Orfey-class destroyer
- Displacement: 1,260 t (1,240 long tons)
- Length: 98 m (321 ft 6 in)
- Beam: 9.3 m (30 ft 6 in)
- Draught: 3 m (9 ft 10 in)
- Installed power: 4 Normand boilers; 32,000 PS (24,000 kW)
- Propulsion: 2 shafts, 2 steam turbines
- Speed: 31 knots (57 km/h; 36 mph)
- Range: 1,250 nmi (2,320 km; 1,440 mi) at 16 knots (30 km/h; 18 mph)
- Complement: 167
- Armament: 4 × single 102 mm (4 in) guns; 1 × single 40 mm (1.6 in) AA gun; 2 × 7.62 mm (0.3 in) machine guns; 3 × triple 450 mm (17.7 in) torpedo tubes; 80 × naval mines

Grom (Russian: Гром) was one of eight Orfey-class destroyers built for the Imperial Russian Navy during the First World War. The ship's main battery consisted of four 102 mm (4 in) guns and she also armed with nine 450 mm (17.7 in) torpedo tubes. Completed in 1916, she served with the Baltic Fleet and made six raids into the Baltic Sea to attack German shipping or lay minefields. The ship was sunk during the Battle of Kassar Wiek when the Germans invaded the West Estonian Archipelago in October 1917 (Operation Albion).

== Design and description ==
The Orfey-class ships were designed as an improved version of the Derzky class. Grom normally displaced 1,260 long tons (1,280 t) and 1,563 long tons (1,588 t) at full load. She measured 98 meters (321 ft 6 in) long overall with a beam of 9.3 meters (30 ft 6 in), and a draft of 2.98 meters (9 ft 9 in). They were propelled by two AEG-Vulcan steam turbines, each driving one propeller shaft that were designed to produce a total of 32,000 shaft horsepower (24,000 kW) using steam from four Normand boilers for an intended maximum speed of 35 knots (65 km/h; 40 mph) using forced draft. On Grom's sea trials, she only reached 31.5 knots (58.3 km/h; 36.2 mph). The Orfeys carried enough fuel oil to give them a range of 1,680 nautical miles (3,110 km; 1,930 mi) at 21 knots (39 km/h; 24 mph). Their crew numbered 150.

The Orfey-class ships were originally intended to have an armament of two single 102-millimeter (four-inch) Pattern 1911 Obukhov guns, one gun each on the forecastle and stern, and a dozen 450-millimeter (17.7 in) torpedo tubes in six double mounts. The Naval General Staff changed this to four triple mounts once they became available in 1914. Based on a battle between the destroyer Novik and two German destroyers in August 1915, the Naval General Staff decided to exchange the rearmost torpedo mount for two more four-inch guns, although the modification was not made until the ship was fitting out. Both of these guns were mounted on the stern, aft of the torpedo tubes. The final configuration of the Orfeys' torpedo suite was one mount between the forward funnels and two mounts aft of the rear funnel. Grom carried three reload torpedoes and was also equipped with a pair of 7.62-millimeter (0.3 in) Maxim machine guns on single mounts. The ships could carry 80 M1912 naval mines or 50 larger ones. They were also fitted with a 2.7-meter (9 ft) Barr and Stroud rangefinder and two 60-centimeter (24 in) searchlights. A 40-millimeter (1.6 in) anti-aircraft (AA) gun was ordered to be fitted on a platform between the rear torpedo mount and the stern guns on 8 March 1916.

== Construction and career ==
Grom was laid down at the Metal Works in Petrograd in November 1913 and launched on 15 June 1915. The ship was towed to Helsinki, Grand Duchy of Finland, for fitting out in November. Her sea trials began on 9 December 1915 and she was commissioned on 4 May 1916. Grom made six sorties into the Baltic Sea that year in unsuccessful attempts to interdict the German supply of high-quality Swedish iron ore either by combat or the laying of minefields. These operations were carried out before the Gulf of Finland was iced over late in the year. During one of these missions on the night of 13/14 May with Rear Admiral Alexander Kolchak aboard, she led her sister ship Pobeditel and Novik in search of German iron ore convoys sailing along the Swedish coast. They found a convoy of nine ore carriers showing lights escorted by the auxiliary cruiser Hermann and three smaller ships near Häfringe Island. Uncertain if the ships were Swedish or German, the destroyers fired warning shots that caused Hermann to launch a signal rocket that sent the cargo ships heading for Swedish territorial waters while the escorts began laying a smoke screen. The Russians began shooting at Hermann at 2338, but did not initially close the range because they had misidentified the ship as a cruiser. By the time Grom finished off Hermann with torpedoes around 0015, the convoy had escaped and the Russians withdrew. Another of these was on the night of 29/30 June when Pobeditel led Grom and their sister Orfey in search of a German convoy off the Swedish coast near Bråviken in thick fog. They encountered a group of eight German destroyers and retreated back towards the armored cruiser Gromoboi and the light cruiser Diana. The Germans pursued the destroyers until they spotted the cruisers and attacked with torpedoes. All of them missed and both sides disengaged without suffering any casualties. While undergoing a refit in early 1917, her armament was augmented by the addition of a 63-millimeter (2.5 in) AA gun.

=== Battle of Kassar Wiek ===
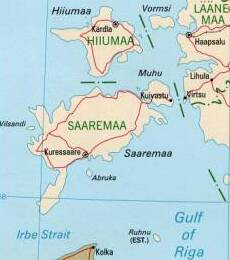
Kassar Wiek is the western area of Moon Sound, between Muhu, Saaremaa, and Hiiumaa Islands

Following the capture of Riga, Governorate of Livonia, in September, the Germans began planning amphibious landings on the islands of the West Estonian Archipelago, codenamed Operation Albion. Their objective was to deny Moon Sound to the Imperial Russian Navy and to capture the islands of Muhu and Saaremaa so that it no longer had bases from which to threaten the supply lines through the Gulf of Riga. The main thrust of the operation was to consist of landings on the northwestern coast of Saaremaa, with follow-on objectives to capture the coast-defense artillery positions that blocked German access into the Gulf of Riga and to seize Muhu before the Russians could reinforce the troops there. Kassar Wiek is the shallow western portion of Moon Sound, between the islands of Saarema, Muhu, and Hiiumaa, that lies north of the Gulf of Riga. Soela Strait separates Saaremaa and Hiiuma. The Germans initiated their attack with landings on the northwestern coast of Saaremaa during the morning of 12 October.

By October, Grom had been assigned to the 1st Destroyer Division of the Naval Forces of the Gulf of Riga. The Germans made their first attempt to force a passage through Soela Strait into Kassar Wiek on the afternoon of 12 October, but were repulsed by the existing forces before Grom and three other destroyers arrived as reinforcements. The initial attempt to engage the German torpedo boats defending the western exit of Soela Strait at 0750 on 13 October by Grom, Novik and the destroyer Razyashchy was aborted when the light cruiser Emden moved forward and engaged them at a range of 14,000 m (15,000 yd) which forced them to retreat out of range. Grom had her radio antenna damaged by Emden. A second attempt by two other destroyers and a gunboat that afternoon was also forced to withdraw. An attempt that night to lay a minefield across the strait failed when the crew of the minelayer mutinied and refused to carry out the mission.

After the inconclusive engagements on 12 and 13 October, the German commander, Commodore Paul Heinrich, decided to bait the Russian destroyers into venturing towards the west entrance to the strait and positioned the dreadnought battleship Kaiser out of sight of any Russian forces, but where it could command the length of the strait. Rear Admiral Mikhail Bakhirev, commander of the Russian naval force anticipated another attempt to force the entrance on 14 October and positioned four destroyers, Grom and her sisters Zabiyaka and Pobeditel, half-sister Konstantin and the gunboat Khrabry at the east end of the strait where they could quickly react to the Germans. They sat there at anchor throughout the morning waiting for the Germans to move, but Heinrich waited until midday when all of his ships were ready. He ordered Kaiser to fire at the anchored ships around 1145. The first salvo caught the Russians by surprise and one shell from the second or third salvo hit Grom about 1155 and detonated beneath her. The explosion severed the main and auxiliary steam lines between the boilers and turbines, immobilizing the destroyer, and started a fire. Seven men were killed and six were wounded and she started to slowly sink. Khabry moved to assist the damaged destroyer and tow her to safety, while the other destroyers moved out of range of Kaiser's guns, laying several smoke screens that did little to protect Grom and Khabry in the strong winds. The gunboat could only reach a speed of three to four knots (5.6 to 7.4 km/h; 3.5 to 4.6 mph) while towing the destroyer.

Once the German destroyers and torpedo boats were through the strait, they split into two forces in an attempt to envelop the Russian ships as they formed a line east of Khabry and Grom. They opened fire at ranges of 11,000–12,000 yards (10,000–11,000 m) around 1321, outside the range of the German guns, with little effect. The Russian destroyers then turned northeast, presenting their sterns to the oncoming Germans and a running battle began at a range of 10,400 yards (9,500 m). All of the Russian ships, including Grom and Khabry engaged the southern group of German ships, slightly damaging the destroyer SMS G103. The return fire was heavy and Zabiyaka was hit once in the stern. The Russian destroyers then turned east for a short time before turning around so Konstantin could lay another smoke screen. This caused the Germans to cease fire, although Pobeditel was slightly damaged in the stern and Zabiyaka was near-missed as they moved back towards Grom and Khabry. The towline broke about 1340 as the destroyers passed by and Pobeditel was blamed as she was thought to have come too close to Khabry and her wake overstressed the towline. Khabry was unable to re-establish the tow and Grom's crew began abandoning the ship without orders. She was hit in the stern by a 10.5 cm (4.1 in) shell from the destroyer V100 at 1345 that started another fire. Khabry was ordered to abandon Grom and sink the destroyer. The gunboat hit her several times along the waterline as she followed the other destroyers as they retreated to the east. Grom was on fire and had a heavy list to port when the crew of the destroyer B98 boarded her. They found her mine charts and logbook aboard; B98 began towing the burning ship, but Grom capsized and sank about 1510.

== Bibliography ==
- Apalkov, Yu. V. (1996). Боевые корабли русского флота: 8.1914-10.1917г [Combat Ships of the Russian Fleet: 8.1914-10.1917] (in Russian). ИНТЕК. ISBN 5-7559-0018-3.
- Barrett, Michael B. (2008). Operation Albion: The German Conquest of the Baltic Islands. Indiana University Press. ISBN 978-0-253-34969-9.
- Budzbon, Przemysław (1985). "Russia". In Gray, Randal (ed.). Conway's All the World's Fighting Ships 1906–1921. Naval Institute Press. pp. 291–325. ISBN 0-85177-245-5.
- Greger, René (1972). The Russian Fleet, 1914-1917. Ian Allan. ISBN 0-7110-0255-X.
- Halpern, Paul G. (1994). A Naval History of World War I. Annapolis, Maryland: Naval Institute Press. ISBN 0-87021-266-4.
- O'Hara, Vincent (2017). Clash of Fleets: Naval Battles of the Great War, 1914-18. Naval Institute Press. ISBN 978-1-68247-008-4.
- Staff, Gary (2009). Battle for the Baltic Islands 1917: Triumph of the Imperial German Navy. Pen and Sword Maritime. ISBN 978-1-84415-787-7.
- Verstyuk, Anatoly & Gordeyev, Stanislav (2006). Корабли Минных дивизий. От "Новика" до "Гогланда" [Torpedo Division Ships: From Novik to Gogland] (in Russian). Voennaya Kniga. ISBN 5-902863-10-4.
