= Russian destroyer Letun =

World War I-era Russian destroyer

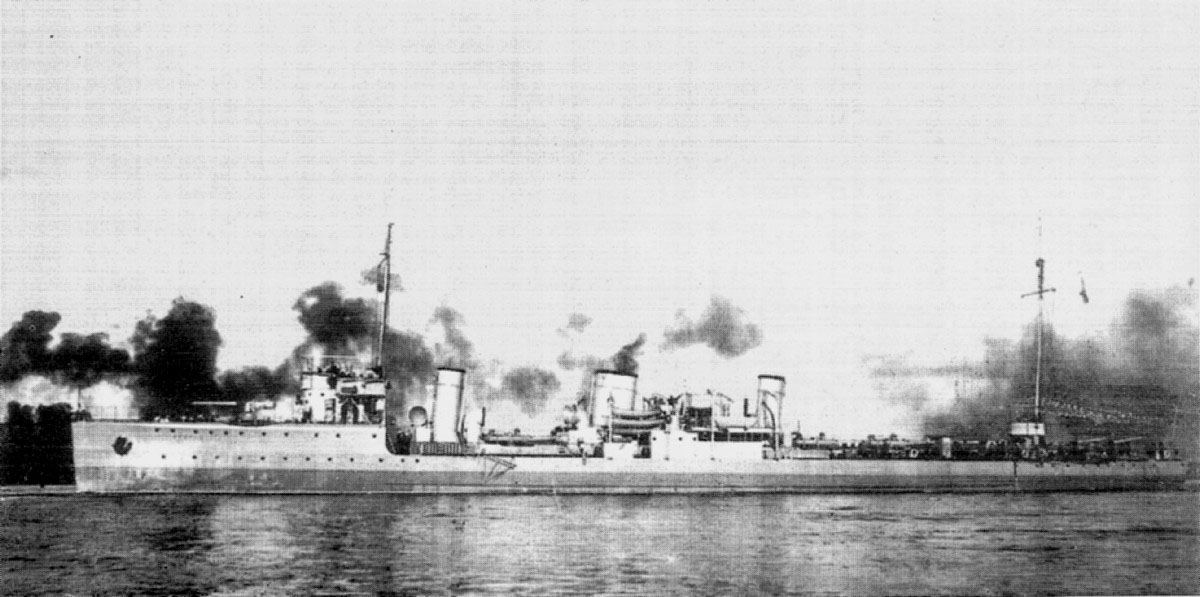

History

Russian Empire
- Name: Letun
- Builder: Metal Works, Petrograd
- Laid down: November 1914
- Launched: 5 October 1915
- Commissioned: 11 July 1916

Soviet Union
- Acquired: October 1917
- Recommissioned: 21 April 1921
- Stricken: 31 May 1922
- Fate: Scrapped after 25 September 1927

General characteristics (as built)
- Class & type: Orfey-class destroyer
- Displacement: 1,260 t (1,240 long tons)
- Length: 98 m (321 ft 6 in)
- Beam: 9.3 m (30 ft 6 in)
- Draught: 2.98 m (9 ft 9 in)
- Installed power: 4 Normand boilers; 32,000 PS (24,000 kW)
- Propulsion: 2 shafts, 2 steam turbines
- Speed: 32 knots (59 km/h; 37 mph)
- Range: 1,680 nmi (3,110 km; 1,930 mi) at 21 knots (39 km/h; 24 mph)
- Complement: 150
- Armament: 4 × single 102 mm (4 in) guns; 3 × triple 450 mm (17.7 in) torpedo tubes; 80 × naval mines

Letun (Летун) was one of eight Orfey-class destroyers built for the Imperial Russian Navy during World War I. Completed in 1916, she served with the Baltic Fleet and made six raids into the Baltic Sea to attack German shipping or lay minefields. The ship struck a naval mine in October that crippled her. Letun's crew joined the Bolsheviks while she was being repaired in 1917. The ship was towed from Helsinki, Grand Duchy of Finland, in April 1918 in what became known as the "Ice Cruise" as the harbor was still iced over. She was placed in reserve later that month and was briefly reactivated in 1921. Letun was stricken from the navy list in 1922 and sold for scrap five years later.

== Design and description ==
The Orfey-class ships were designed as an improved version of the Derzky class. Letun normally displaced 1,260 tonnes (1,240 long tons) and 1,563 t (1,538 long tons) at full load. She measured 98 meters (321 ft 6 in) long overall with a beam of 9.3 meters (30 ft 6 in), and a draft of 2.98 meters (9 ft 9 in). The Orfeys were propelled by two Curtiss-AEG-Vulcan steam turbines, each driving one propeller using steam from four Normand boilers. The turbines were designed to produce a total of 30,000 shaft horsepower (22,000 kW) for an intended maximum speed of 35 knots (65 km/h; 40 mph) using forced draft. On Letun's sea trials, she only reached 32 knots (59 km/h; 37 mph). The ships carried enough fuel oil to give them a range of 1,680 nautical miles (3,110 km; 1,930 mi) at 21 knots (39 km/h; 24 mph). Their crew numbered 150.

The Orfey-class ships were originally intended to have an armament of two single 102-millimeter (four-inch) Pattern 1911 Obukhov guns and a dozen 450-millimeter (17.7 in) torpedo tubes in six double mounts. The Naval General Staff changed this to four triple mounts once they became available and then decided to exchange a torpedo mount for two more four-inch guns in August 1915 while the ships were still under construction. One of these guns was mounted on the forecastle and three on the stern, aft of the torpedo tubes. The Orfeys were completed with one triple torpedo mount between the forward funnels and two mounts aft of the rear funnel and could carry 80 M1912 naval mines or 50 larger ones. They were also equipped with a pair of 7.62-millimeter (0.3 in) Maxim machine guns on single mounts. They were fitted with a 2.7-meter (9 ft) Barr and Stroud rangefinder and two 60-centimeter (24 in) searchlights.

== Construction and career ==
Letun was laid down at the Metal Works in Petrograd in November 1914 and launched on 5 October 1915. The ship was towed to Helsinki, Grand Duchy of Finland, for fitting out. Her sea trials began on 16 May 1916 and she was completed on 11 July. That year, Letun made six sorties into the Baltic Sea that year in unsuccessful attempts to interdict the German supply of high-quality Swedish iron ore either by combat or the laying of minefields. These operations were carried out before the Gulf of Finland was iced over late in the year. During the last of these sorties on 25 October, the ship's stern struck a mine near the island of Aegna in the Bay of Tallinn. Its detonation severely damaged the stern, tore off the rudder, broke both propeller shafts and flooded every compartment from the engine room all the way aft. She was towed to Tallinn, Estonia, for emergency repairs and then to Helsinki for complete repairs.

Her crew joined the Bolsheviks during the October Revolution. She was stationed in Helsinki in late 1917 and early 1918 and was icebound in Helsinki harbor when the Germans decided to intervene in the Finnish Civil War in April 1918. Their troops soon threatened Helsinki and the Baltic Fleet was ordered to evacuate the port. Letun was part of the last echelon to depart before the Germans gained control of the city and had to be towed to Kronstadt from 10 to 16 April 1918 in the "Ice Cruise". She was placed in reserve upon her arrival. The ship was briefly recommissioned on 21 April 1921 before she was disarmed and stricken on 31 May 1922. Letun was sold for scrap on 25 September 1927.

== Bibliography ==
- Apalkov, Yu. V. (1996). Боевые корабли русского флота: 8.1914-10.1917г [Combat Ships of the Russian Fleet: 8.1914-10.1917] (in Russian). ИНТЕК. ISBN 5-7559-0018-3.
- Budzbon, Przemysław (1985). "Russia". In Gray, Randal (ed.). Conway's All the World's Fighting Ships 1906–1921. Naval Institute Press. pp. 291–325. ISBN 0-85177-245-5.
- Verstyuk, Anatoly & Gordeyev, Stanislav (2006). Корабли Минных дивизий. От "Новика" до "Гогланда" [Torpedo Division Ships: From Novik to Gogland] (in Russian). Voennaya Kniga. ISBN 5-902863-10-4.
