= Russian destroyer Samson =

Russian Imperial Navy warship

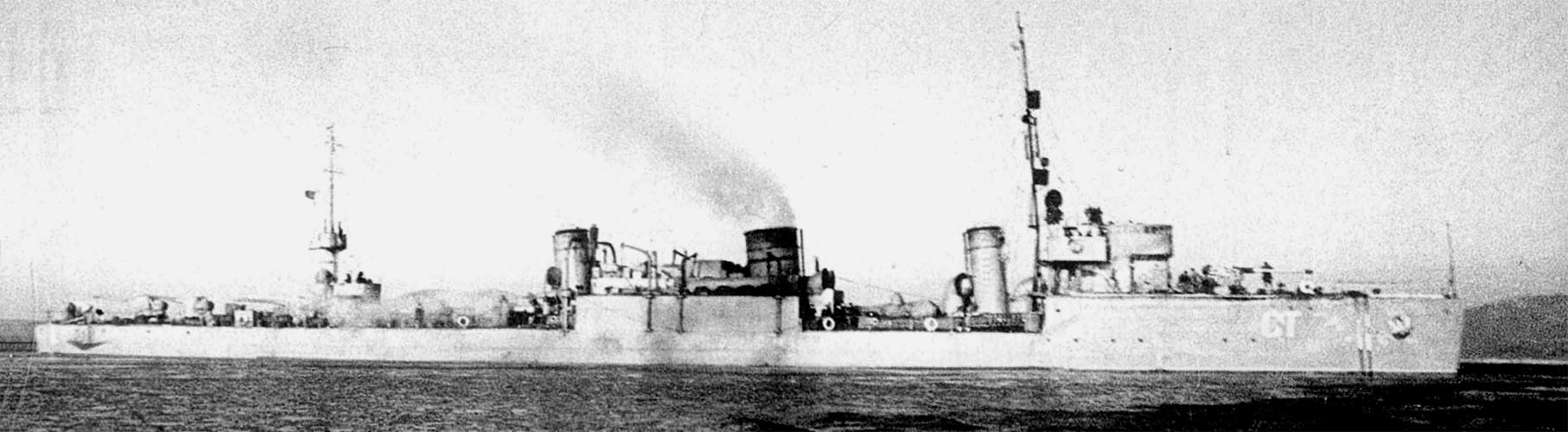

History

Russian Empire
- Name: Samson
- Builder: Metal Works, Saint Petersburg
- Laid down: 30 July 1915
- Launched: 23 May 1916
- Completed: 21 November 1916
- Fate: Joined the Bolsheviks, October 1917

Soviet Union
- Acquired: October 1917
- Renamed: Stalin, 31 December 1922; Samson, 17 December 1946; PKZ-37, 16 June 1951; PKZ-52, 26 November 1953
- Reclassified: As training ship, 17 December 1946; As barracks ship, 1951
- Stricken: 30 May 1956
- Fate: Scrapped, 28 August 1953

General characteristics (as built)
- Class & type: Orfey-class destroyer
- Displacement: 1,260 t (1,240 long tons)
- Length: 98 m (321 ft 6 in)
- Beam: 9.34 m (30 ft 8 in)
- Draught: 2.93 m (9 ft 7 in)
- Installed power: 4 Normand boilers; 32,000 PS (24,000 kW)
- Propulsion: 2 shafts, 2 steam turbines
- Speed: 30 knots (56 km/h; 35 mph)
- Range: 1,680 nmi (3,110 km; 1,930 mi) at 21 knots (39 km/h; 24 mph)
- Complement: 150
- Armament: 4 × single 102 mm (4 in) guns; 3 × triple 450 mm (17.7 in) torpedo tubes; 80 mines

Samson (Самсон) was one of eight Orfey-class destroyers built for the Russian Imperial Navy during World War I. Completed in 1916, she served with the Baltic Fleet and played a minor role in the Battle of Kassar Wiek when the Germans invaded the West Estonian Archipelago in October 1917 (Operation Albion). Her crew joined the Bolshevik Red Fleet during the October Revolution of 1917. The ship was towed from Helsinki, Grand Duchy of Finland, in April 1918 in what became known as the "Ice Cruise" as the harbor was still iced over.

The destroyer was renamed Stalin (Сталин) in 1922. She was transferred to the Pacific Fleet in 1936. The ship played a minor role in the Battle of Lake Khasan in 1938. Stalin briefly served as a training ship in 1940 before being assigned to a submarine unit in 1941. The ship was under repair from late 1941 to early 1943 and was rearmed at the end of the year. She was refitted again in 1945 and resumed her earlier mission as a training ship as World War II was ending in August. Stalin resumed her previous name in 1946 as she was disarmed and converted into a stationary training ship. The ship was converted into a barracks ship in 1951 and renamed PKZ-37. She was renamed PKZ-52 two years later. The ship was scrapped in 1956.

== Design and description ==
The Orfey-class ships were designed as an improved version of the Derzky class. Samson normally displaced 1,260 metric tons (1,240 long tons) and 1,568 t (1,543 long tons) at full load. She measured 98 meters (321 ft 6 in) long overall with a beam of 9.34 meters (30 ft 8 in), and a draft of 3 meters (9 ft 10 in). The Orfeys were propelled by two Curtiss-AEG-Vulcan steam turbines, each driving one propeller using steam from four Normand boilers. The turbines were designed to produce a total of 32,000 metric horsepower (24,000 kW) for an intended maximum speed of 35 knots (65 km/h; 40 mph) using forced draft. On Samson's sea trials, she only reached 30.8 knots (57.0 km/h; 35.4 mph). The ships carried enough fuel oil to give them a range of 1,680 nautical miles (3,110 km; 1,930 mi) at 21 knots (39 km/h; 24 mph). Their crew numbered 150.

The Orfey-class ships were originally intended to have an armament of two single 102-millimeter (four-inch) Pattern 1911 Obukhov guns and a dozen 450-millimeter (17.7 in) torpedo tubes in six double mounts. The Naval General Staff changed this to four triple mounts once they became available and then decided to exchange a torpedo mount for two more 102 mm guns in August 1915 while the ships were still under construction. One of these guns was mounted on the forecastle and three on the stern, aft of the torpedo tubes. They were also fitted with a pair of 7.62-millimeter (0.3 in) Maxim machine guns on single mounts. The Orfeys were completed with one triple torpedo mount between the forward funnels and two mounts aft of the rear funnel. The ships could carry 80 M1912 naval mines or 50 larger ones. They were also fitted with a 2.7-meter (9 ft) Barr and Stroud rangefinder and two 60-centimeter (24 in) searchlights.

== Construction and career ==
Samson was laid down at the Metal Works in Petrograd on 30 July 1915, launched on 23 May 1916 and completed on 21 November. At some point during 1917, she received a 76-millimeter (3 in) Lender AA gun.

=== Battle of Kassar Wiek ===
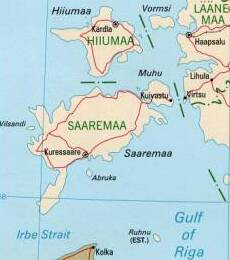
Kassar Wiek is the western area of Moon Sound, between Muhu, Saaremaa, and Hiiumaa Islands

Following the capture of Riga, Governorate of Livonia, in September, the Germans began planning amphibious landings on the islands of the West Estonian Archipelago, codenamed Operation Albion. Their objective was to deny Moon Sound to the Imperial Russian Navy and to capture the islands of Muhu and Saaremaa so that it no longer had bases from which to threaten the supply lines through the Gulf of Riga. The main thrust of the operation was to consist of landings on the northwestern coast of Saaremaa, with follow-on objectives to capture the coast-defense artillery positions that blocked German access into the Gulf of Riga and to seize Muhu before the Russians could reinforce the troops there. Kassar Wiek is the shallow western portion of Moon Sound, between the islands of Saarema, Muhu, and Hiiumaa, that lies north of the Gulf of Riga. Soela Strait separates Saaremaa and Hiiuma. The Germans initiated their attack with landings on the northwestern coast of Saaremaa during the morning of 12 October.

The initial attempt to engage the German torpedo boats defending the western exit of Soela Strait at 0750 on 13 October was aborted when the light cruiser Emden moved forward and engaged the three attacking destroyers at a range of 14,000 m (15,000 yd) which forced them to retreat out of range. Samson and her half-sister Izyaslav arrived around 0930 and were forced to retreat when Emden moved forward again and opened fire. The following afternoon, the Germans were able to drive off the defending destroyers, sinking her sister Grom, and advance into the Kassar Wiek. Samson was one of eight destroyers that arrived at 1520, but Rear-Admiral Stark, commander of destroyers in the Gulf of Riga, declined to attack the German ships. He decided instead to bombard them at long range around 1535. The Russian guns were accurate, but no hits were made before visibility worsened as dusk approached. During the battle the ship fired 24 shells. The Germans made another push into Kassar Wiek on the morning of 15 October to support their forces attacking the causeway between Saaremaa and Muhu. Samson, her half-sister Leytenant Ilin and the gunboat Grozyashchy arrived around noon to reinforce the defenders. Together with the gunboat Khivinets and the destroyers Moskvitianin and Vsadnik the ships patrolled the eastern portion of Kassar Wiek that night. At 0830 on 16 October they attacked the two forwardmost German destroyers without result and were forced to withdraw when the rest of the German destroyers moved forward. The Germans were able to sweep the minefield laid by the Russians in the middle of Kassar Wiek and moved their hospital ship Viola forward to receive casualties from the land fighting. The Russians thought that she was a troopship and the patrol force opened fire at a range of 12,000 m (13,000 yd) beginning at 1214 with little result. The Germans returned fire when the advancing ships reached a range of 10,000 m (11,000 yd). Their fire was considerably more effective, badly damaging the destroyer Avtroil and the Russians were forced to retreat.

=== Postwar activities ===
After arriving in Helsinki, Samson's crew joined the Bolsheviks. The ship arrived in Petrograd on 25 October and helped to suppress the Kerensky–Krasnov uprising. Samson returned to Helsinki before the Gulf of Finland iced over. She was icebound in Helsinki harbor when the Germans decided to intervene in the Finnish Civil War in April 1918. Their troops soon threatened Helsinki and the Baltic Fleet was ordered to evacuate the port. Samson was part of the last echelon to depart before the Germans gained control of the city and had to be towed to Kronstadt from 10 to 16 April 1918 in the "Ice Cruise". The ship was put in long-term storage at Kronstadt in October 1918, but was placed in reserve in November 1919. She was recommissioned on 21 April 1921 and was renamed Stalin on 31 December 1922. The ship was refitted in 1925–1926, which included the enclosure of the bridge, and visited Oslo, Norway, in August 1930.

The ship began a modernization in 1933 that lasted until 1936. This the replacement of the rangefinder by a 3-meter (9 ft 10 in) DM-3 model, the installation of ten 165-kilogram (364 lb) B-1 and fifteen 41-kilogram (90 lb) M-1 depth charges, and the addition of three reload torpedoes. On 2 July 1936 Stalin began its voyage through the White Sea Canal and then the Northern Sea Route after which she arrived at Vladivostok on 17 October, upon which time the ship was assigned to the Pacific Fleet. Stalin escorted Soviet troopships during the Battle of Lake Khasan in August 1938. She became a training ship in 1940, but was reassigned to the 4th Submarine Brigade in Vladivostok in January 1941. By then the ship's hull and boilers were in such bad shape that Stalin was under repair from December 1941 to August 1943. Beginning in December, her armament was modernized to the Project 15 standard: her 76 mm Lender AA gun and four Maxim machine guns were replaced by two 45-millimeter (1.8 in) 21-K AA guns, a pair of 37-millimeter (1.5 in) 70-K AA guns, and three 12.7-millimeter (0.50 in) DShK heavy machine guns. She also received a Tamir-5 sonar system. These changes increased her standard displacement to 1,437 t (1,414 long tons) and 1,515 t (1,491 long tons) at normal load, causing her draft to increase to 3.2 m (10 ft 6 in). They also decreased her range to 1,700 nmi (3,100 km; 2,000 mi) at 15 knots (28 km/h; 17 mph). Her complement increased to 167 officers and men.

Stalin began a refit in January 1945; upon its completion in August she became a training ship again and played no part in the Pacific War. On 17 December 1946, the ship was decommissioned, disarmed, converted into a stationary training ship, and resumed her original name of Samson. She was converted into a barracks ship and renamed as PKZ-37 on 16 June 1951. The ship was renamed again on 26 November 1953 as PKZ-52. On 30 May 1956, the ship was stricken from the navy list and demolition began on 28 August in Vladivostok.

== Bibliography ==
- Apalkov, Yu. V. (1996). Боевые корабли русского флота: 8.1914-10.1917г [Combat Ships of the Russian Fleet: 8.1914-10.1917] (in Russian). ИНТЕК. ISBN 5-7559-0018-3.
- Berezhnoy, S. S. (2002). Крейсера и Миносцы: Справочик [Cruisers and Destroyers: Reference] (in Russian). Moscow: Ввоенное Ииздательство. ISBN 5-203-01780-8.
- Budzbon, Przemysław (1985). "Russia". In Gray, Randal (ed.). Conway's All the World's Fighting Ships 1906–1921. Naval Institute Press. pp. 291–325. ISBN 0-85177-245-5.
- Budzbon, Przemysław; Radziemski, Jan & Twardowski, Marek (2022). Warships of the Soviet Fleets 1939–1945. Vol. I: Major Combatants. Annapolis, Maryland: Naval Institute Press. ISBN 978-1-68247-877-6.
- O'Hara, Vincent (2017). Clash of Fleets: Naval Battles of the Great War, 1914-18. Naval Institute Press. ISBN 978-1-68247-008-4.
- Platonov, Andrey V. (2002). Энциклопедия советских надводных кораблей 1941–1945 [Encyclopedia of Soviet Surface Ships 1941–1945] (in Russian). Poligon. ISBN 5-89173-178-9.
- Rohwer, Jürgen (2005). Chronology of the War at Sea 1939–1945: The Naval History of World War Two (Third Revised ed.). Naval Institute Press. ISBN 1-59114-119-2.
- Staff, Gary (2009). Battle for the Baltic Islands 1917: Triumph of the Imperial German Navy. Pen and Sword Maritime. ISBN 978-1-84415-787-7.
- Verstyuk, Anatoly & Gordeyev, Stanislav (2006). Корабли Минных дивизий. От "Новика" до "Гогланда" [Torpedo Division Ships: From Novik to Gogland] (in Russian). Voennaya Kniga. ISBN 5-902863-10-4.
