= Boris Ivin =

Soviet Russian footballer and coach

Personal information
- Full name: Boris Ivanovich Ivin
- Date of birth: 1909
- Place of birth: St. Petersburg, Russia
- Date of death: 1942 (aged 32–33)
- Place of death: Kazan, Russian SFSR
- Positions: Forward; midfielder

Senior career*
Years	Team	Apps	(Gls)
1927–1929	FC Krasny Vyborzhets Leningrad		
1930	FC Vyborzhskiy Metallist Leningrad		
1931–1932	Leningradsky Metallichesky Zavod		
1933	FC Dynamo Odesa		
1934–1935	Leningradsky Metallichesky Zavod		
1936–1941	FC Zenit Leningrad	75	(10)

Managerial career
- 1934: Leningradsky Metallichesky Zavod
- 1938: FC Stalinets Leningrad
- * Club domestic league appearances and goals

Boris Ivanovich Ivin (Russian: Борис Иванович Ивин; 1909–1942) was a Soviet Russian football player and coach.

== Biography ==
Boris Ivin spent his childhood in a summer cottage village near Saint Petersburg (now the Shuvalovo-Ozerki microdistrict). He was fond of football, weightlifting, skiing and ski jumping. He began to play football seriously in the team of the Vyborg district in the championship of Leningrad. From July 1929 he played for the second squad of the city's national team. In 1930 he played for the USSR national team, became its captain.
