= SMS Emden (1916) =

Light cruiser of the German Imperial Navy

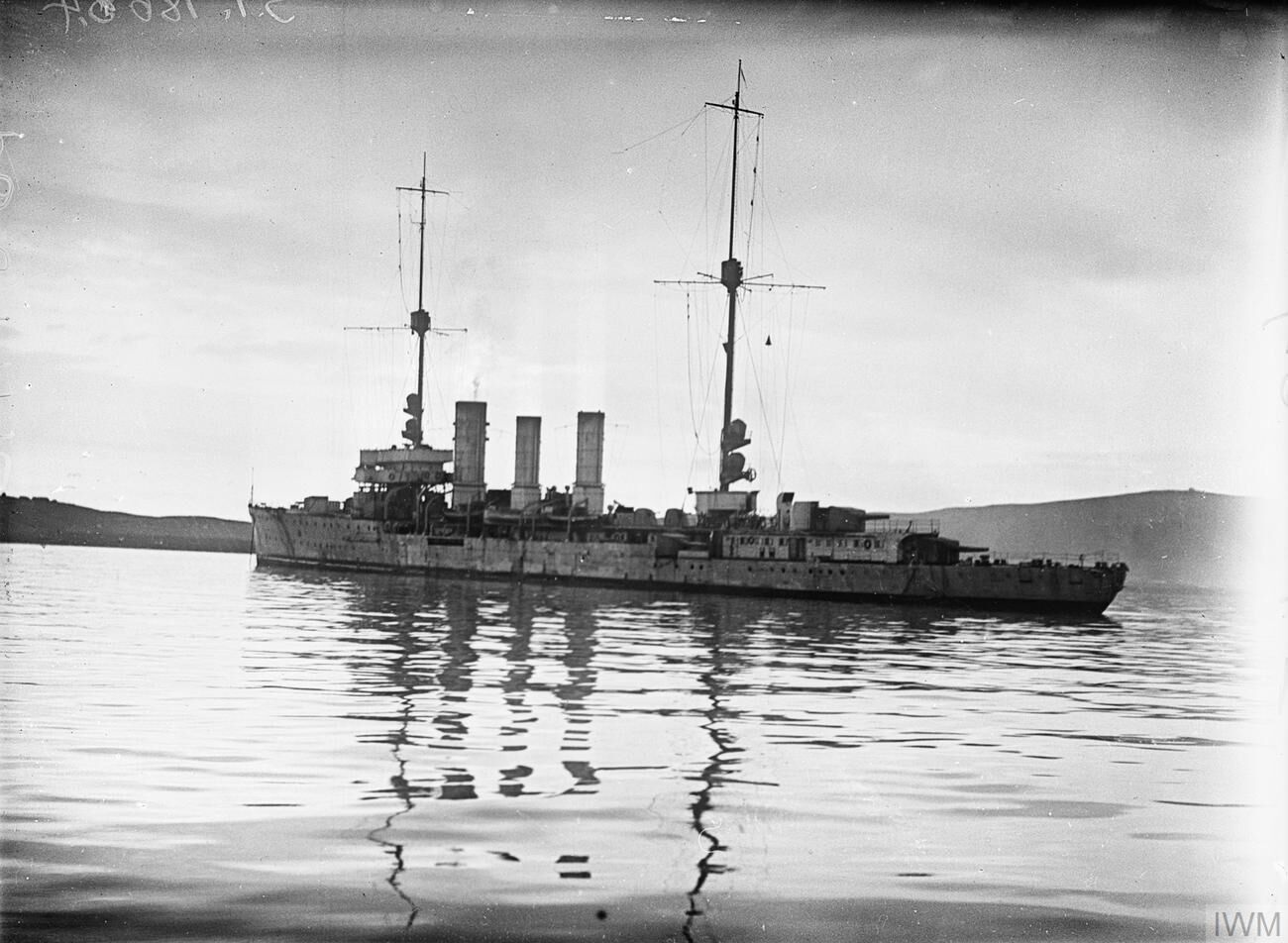
- SMS Emden interned at Scapa Flow after World War I

History

German Empire
- Name: Emden
- Namesake: SMS Emden
- Builder: AG Weser, Bremen
- Laid down: December 1914
- Launched: 1 February 1916
- Commissioned: 16 December 1916
- Fate: Ceded to France, scrapped in 1926

General characteristics
- Class & type: Königsberg-class cruiser (1915)
- Displacement: Normal: 5,440 t (5,350 long tons); Full load: 7,125 t (7,012 long tons)
- Length: 151.4 m (496 ft 9 in)
- Beam: 14.2 m (46 ft 7 in)
- Draft: 5.96 m (19 ft 7 in)
- Installed power: 31,000 shp (23,000 kW); 12 × water-tube boilers
- Propulsion: 2 × screw propellers; 2 × steam turbines
- Speed: 27.5 knots (50.9 km/h; 31.6 mph)
- Range: 4,850 nmi (8,980 km; 5,580 mi) at 12 kn (22 km/h; 14 mph)
- Crew: 17 officers; 458 enlisted men
- Armament: 8 × 15 cm (5.9 in) SK L/45 guns; 2 × 8.8 cm (3.5 in) SK L/45 guns; 4 × 50 cm (19.7 in) torpedo tubes; 200 mines
- Armor: Belt: 60 mm (2.4 in); Deck: 60 cm; Conning tower: 100 mm (3.9 in)

SMS Emden ("His Majesty's Ship Emden") (Note: "SMS" stands for "Seiner Majestät Schiff" (German: His Majesty's Ship).) was a German light cruiser belonging to the Königsberg class, built during the First World War. Emden served in the German Kaiserliche Marine (Imperial Navy) until the end of the war, at which point she was ceded to France. The ship was named after the previous Emden, which had been destroyed at the Battle of Cocos earlier in the war. She mounted an Iron Cross on her stem-head in honor of the earlier Emden. The new cruiser was laid down in 1914 at the AG Weser shipyard in Bremen, launched in February 1916, and commissioned into the High Seas Fleet in December 1916. Armed with eight 15 cm SK L/45 guns, the ship had a top speed of 27.5 kn (50.9 km/h; 31.6 mph).

After her commissioning, she was assigned to serve as a flotilla leader for torpedo boats. She participated in only one major action, Operation Albion, in October 1917. There, she shelled Russian gun batteries and troop positions and engaged Russian destroyers and gunboats. The ship also led a successful, albeit minor, operation against British shipping in the North Sea in December 1917. After the end of the war, she was interned with the rest of the German fleet in Scapa Flow. On 21 June 1919, the interned fleet scuttled itself, though Emden was run aground by British ships before she could sink completely. Ceded to France in the Treaty of Versailles, she was too badly damaged by the attempted scuttling and beaching to see service with the French Navy, so was instead used as a target after 1922, and broken up for scrap in 1926.

== Design ==
Design work began on the Königsberg-class cruisers before construction had begun on their predecessors of the Wiesbaden class. The new ships were broadly similar to the earlier cruisers, with only minor alterations in the arrangement of some components, including the forward broadside guns, which were raised a level to reduce their tendency to be washed out in heavy seas. They were also fitted with larger conning towers.

Emden was 151.4 meters (496 ft 9 in) long overall and had a beam of 14.2 m (46 ft 7 in) and a draft of 5.96 m (19 ft 7 in) forward. She displaced 5,440 t (5,350 long tons) normally and up to 7,125 t (7,012 long tons) at full load. The ship had a fairly small superstructure that consisted primarily of a conning tower forward. She was fitted with a pair of pole masts, the fore just aft of the conning tower and the mainmast further aft. Her hull had a long forecastle that extended for the first third of the ship, stepping down to main deck level just aft of the conning tower, before reducing a deck further at the mainmast for a short quarterdeck. The ship had a crew of 17 officers and 458 enlisted men.

Her propulsion system consisted of two sets of steam turbines that drove a pair of screw propellers. Steam was provided by ten coal-fired and two oil-fired Marine-type water-tube boilers that were vented through three funnels. The engines were rated to produce 31,000 shaft horsepower (23,000 kW), which provided a top speed of 27.5 knots (50.9 km/h; 31.6 mph). At a more economical cruising speed of 12 knots (22 km/h; 14 mph), the ship had a range of 4,850 nautical miles (8,980 km; 5,580 mi).

The ship was armed with a main battery of eight 15 cm (5.9 in) SK L/45 guns in single pedestal mounts. Two were placed side by side forward on the forecastle, four were located amidships, two on either side, and two were arranged in a superfiring pair aft. They were supplied with 1,040 rounds of ammunition, for 130 shells per gun. Königsberg also carried two 8.8 cm (3.5 in) SK L/45 anti-aircraft guns mounted on the centerline astern of the funnels. She was also equipped with a pair of 50 cm (19.7 in) torpedo tubes with eight torpedoes in deck-mounted swivel launchers amidships. She also carried 200 mines.

The ship was protected by a waterline armor belt that was 60 mm (2.4 in) thick amidships. Protection for the ship's internals was reinforced with a curved armor deck that was 60 mm thick; the deck sloped downward at the sides and connected to the bottom edge of the belt armor. The conning tower had 100 mm (3.9 in) thick sides.

== Service history ==
Emden was ordered under the contract name "Ersatz Nymphe", (Note: German warships were ordered under provisional names. Additions to the fleet were given a single letter; ships intended to replace older or lost vessels were ordered as "Ersatz (name of the ship to be replaced)".) and was laid down at the AG Weser shipyard in Bremen in December 1914. Named for the earlier Emden that was sunk in 1914, she was launched on 1 February 1916 without fanfare, after which fitting-out work commenced. She was commissioned into active service on 16 December and thereafter began sea trials under the command of Fregattenkapitän (FK—Frigate Captain) Max Hagedorn. After completing her initial testing in mid-March 1917, Kommodore (Commodore) Paul Heinrich (the II Commander of Torpedo Boats) came aboard Emden and made her his flagship. Emden thereafter joined the High Seas Fleet and spent the following months carrying out local defensive patrols in the German Bight. Heinrich became I Commander of Torpedo Boats on 5 June, and he remained aboard Emden. In August, FK Ernst von Gagern replaced Hagedorn as the ship's captain.

=== Operation Albion ===
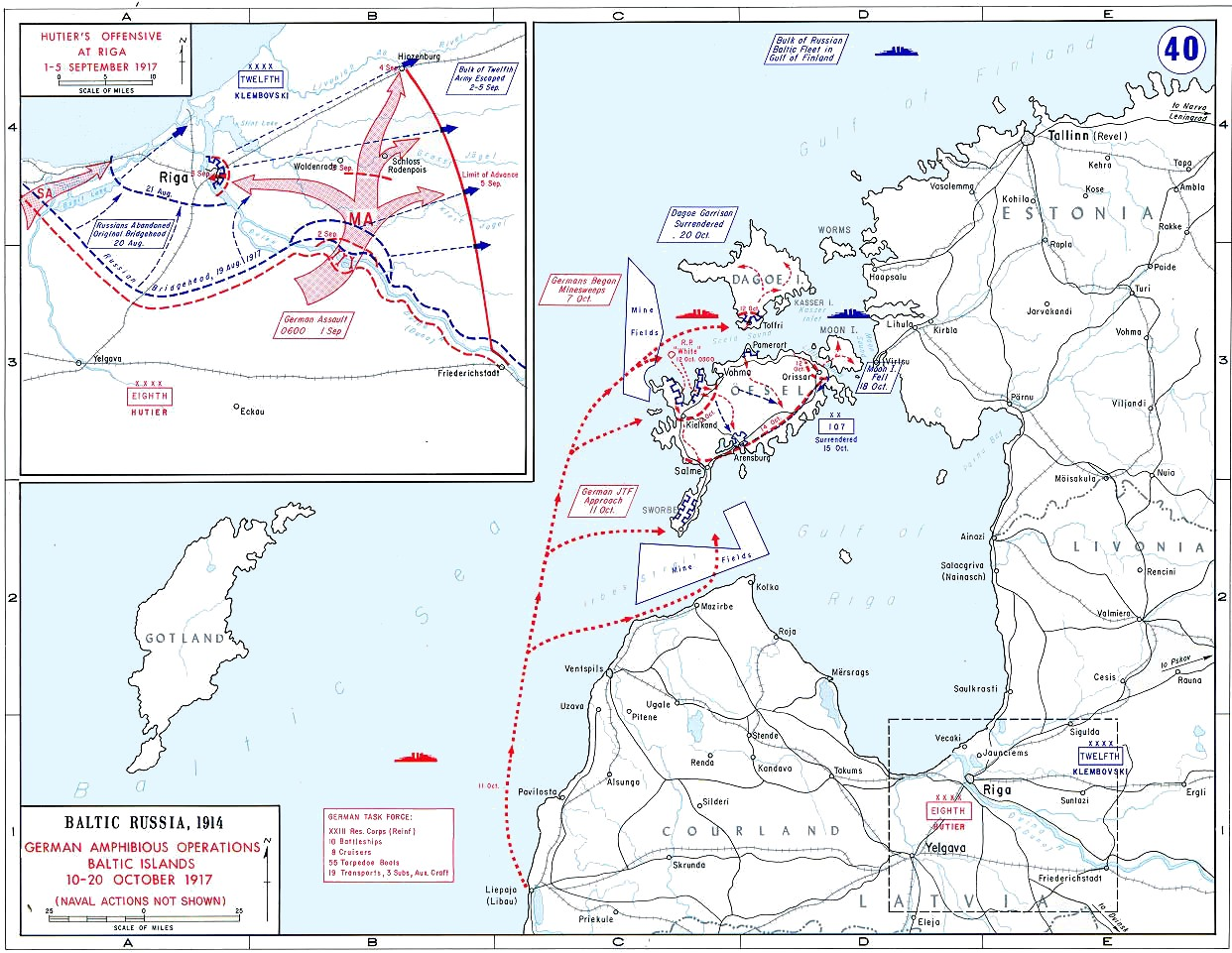
Operations of the German Navy and Army during Operation Albion

In September, Emden was assigned to the Sonderverband (Special Unit) that was to carry out Operation Albion, the invasion of the islands of Dagö, Ösel and Moon that guarded the Gulf of Riga in the Baltic Sea. She joined the minelaying cruiser Nautilus in Libau on 21 September as preparations for the operation began to get underway. Emden then formed part of the escort for the invasion fleet as it sailed for the eastern Baltic on 9 October. For the initial assault on 12 October, Emden was tasked with bombarding a Russian gun emplacement at Pamerort; Heinrich was given command of the landings there. At 06:08, Emden opened fire on the gun battery. Her first two salvos fell short, but the third hit and disabled the telephone wires and speaking tubes, which rendered central control of the Russian guns impossible. By 07:00, the Russian guns were silenced and German troops began to go ashore unopposed. Two and a half hours later, a pair of Russian destroyers attempted to intervene, but Emden engaged them and drove them off.

The next morning, a group of eight Russian destroyers made an attack on the German fleet. Emden moved forward at around 07:45 to support the German screen, and at 07:56, she opened fire on the three leading destroyers at a range of 13,800 meters (15,100 yd). Emden's salvos straddled the destroyers several times, raining shell splinters down on the Russians. They suffered no casualties, but the wireless equipment for the destroyer Grom was disabled. At 09:30, another pair of destroyers briefly engaged Emden. The weather had by then become poor, but the Germans had erected a signal station at Pamerort to assist Emden in directing her fire. At around 12:20, the Russian gunboat Chivinetz arrived with a pair of destroyers; she was intended to use her long-range guns to drive off Emden. She arrived at 13:00 and briefly engaged Emden. Neither ship was hit, though Emden straddled the gunboat several times before Chivinetz retreated.

On 14 October, Emden participated in an operation to clear the Kassar Wiek—the body of water between Dagö and Ösel—of Russian naval forces. She and the battleship Kaiser were to steam to the entrance to Soelo Sound, where they could support the force of torpedo-boats tasked with sweeping the Kassar Wiek. Four Russian destroyers approached Emden, but kept out of range of her guns. Kaiser, however, was in range, and at approximately 11:50, she opened fire. She quickly scored a hit on the destroyer Grom. The round failed to explode and passed through Grom, causing the ship to begin sinking. The other destroyers subsequently steamed off at high speed. Emden remained in her position outside Soelo Sound after the sweep was completed, through the next day. The following day, Emden initiated the bombardment of Dagö, starting at 15:00. On the morning of the 18th, Emden bombarded Russian positions on Dagö again; she fired 170 shells and forced the Russians to retreat. By 20 October, the islands were under German control and the Russian naval forces had either been destroyed or forced to withdraw. The Admiralstab ordered the naval component to return to the North Sea. Emden was detached from the Sonderverband three days later, and by 28 October, she had arrived back in the North Sea and had resumed defensive patrols.

=== Later operations ===
Map of the North Sea

From 10 to 20 November, Emden was dry docked for an overhaul, after which she resumed defensive operations in the German Bight. In December, Emden led a raid on British shipping in the North Sea. Early on the 11th, Emden and the II Flotilla left port; the torpedo-boat flotilla split in half off the Dogger Bank to search for the British convoy, while Emden stood by in support at the Dogger Bank. The 3rd Half-Flotilla swept the eastern British coast while the 4th Half-Flotilla searched the waters off Norway. The torpedo boats sank six steamers located and the destroyer Partridge; the destroyer HMS Pellew was badly damaged as well. The torpedo-boats rejoined Emden late on 12 December and returned to port, arriving in Wilhelmshaven on 14 December.

Emden next went to sea on 10 March 1918 for a sweep through the Skagerrak and the Kattegat to search for British shipping to Norway. The cruisers Frankfurt, Graudenz, and Bremse also participated in the operation, along with VI and IX Torpedo-boat Flotillas. On 11 March, the torpedo-boat flotillas divided into half-flotillas, each led by one of the cruisers. Emden and her torpedo boats patrolled in the Kattegat in the direction of Gothenburg, Sweden. In the course of the operation, the Germans only captured five small vessels. They steamed back to Germany via the Little Belt on 13 March, passing through Kiel and then transiting the Kaiser Wilhelm Canal back to the North Sea and ultimately Wilhelmshaven.

German attacks on shipping between Britain and Norway, which had begun in late 1917, prompted the Grand Fleet to begin escorting convoys with a detached battle squadron. This decision presented the Germans with opportunity for which they had been waiting the entire war: a portion of the numerically stronger Grand Fleet was separated and could be isolated and destroyed. Admiral Franz von Hipper planned the operation: the battlecruisers of I Scouting Group, along with light cruisers and destroyers, would attack one of the large convoys while the rest of the High Seas Fleet would stand by, ready to attack the British battle squadron when it intervened. At 05:00 on 23 April 1918, the German fleet—including Emden—departed from the Schillig roadstead. Hipper, aboard the battleship Baden, ordered wireless transmissions be kept to a minimum, to prevent radio intercepts by British intelligence. During the voyage north, the battlecruiser Moltke suffered a machinery breakdown, and she had to be towed back to port. Emden and several torpedo boats were detached to cover Moltke's withdrawal. In the meantime, the Germans failed to locate the convoy, and by late in the day, the German fleet had made it back to the defensive minefields surrounding their bases. It was later discovered that the convoy had left port a day later than expected by the German planning staff.

On 1 June, Emden was dry-docked at the AG Weser shipyard for periodic maintenance, though partway through she was moved to the Kaiserliche Werft in Wilhelmshaven. Work was completed by 15 July, when she returned to the fleet to resume command of the torpedo-boat flotillas. The ship's last wartime operation took place in early October, when the German naval forces that had been based in occupied Flanders—mainly torpedo boats and U-boats—had to withdraw in the face of Allied advances during the Hundred Days Offensive. Emden and several torpedo-boat flotillas sortied and patrolled as far as Terschelling to cover the retreating ships. Emden was to participate in a final, climactic attack by the High Seas Fleet in late October. The planned operation called for raids on Allied shipping in the Thames estuary and Flanders to draw out the Grand Fleet. On the morning of 29 October 1918, the order was given to sail from Wilhelmshaven the following day. Starting on the night of 29 October, sailors on Thüringen and then on several other battleships mutinied. The unrest ultimately forced Admirals Hipper and Reinhard Scheer to cancel the operation.

=== Fate ===
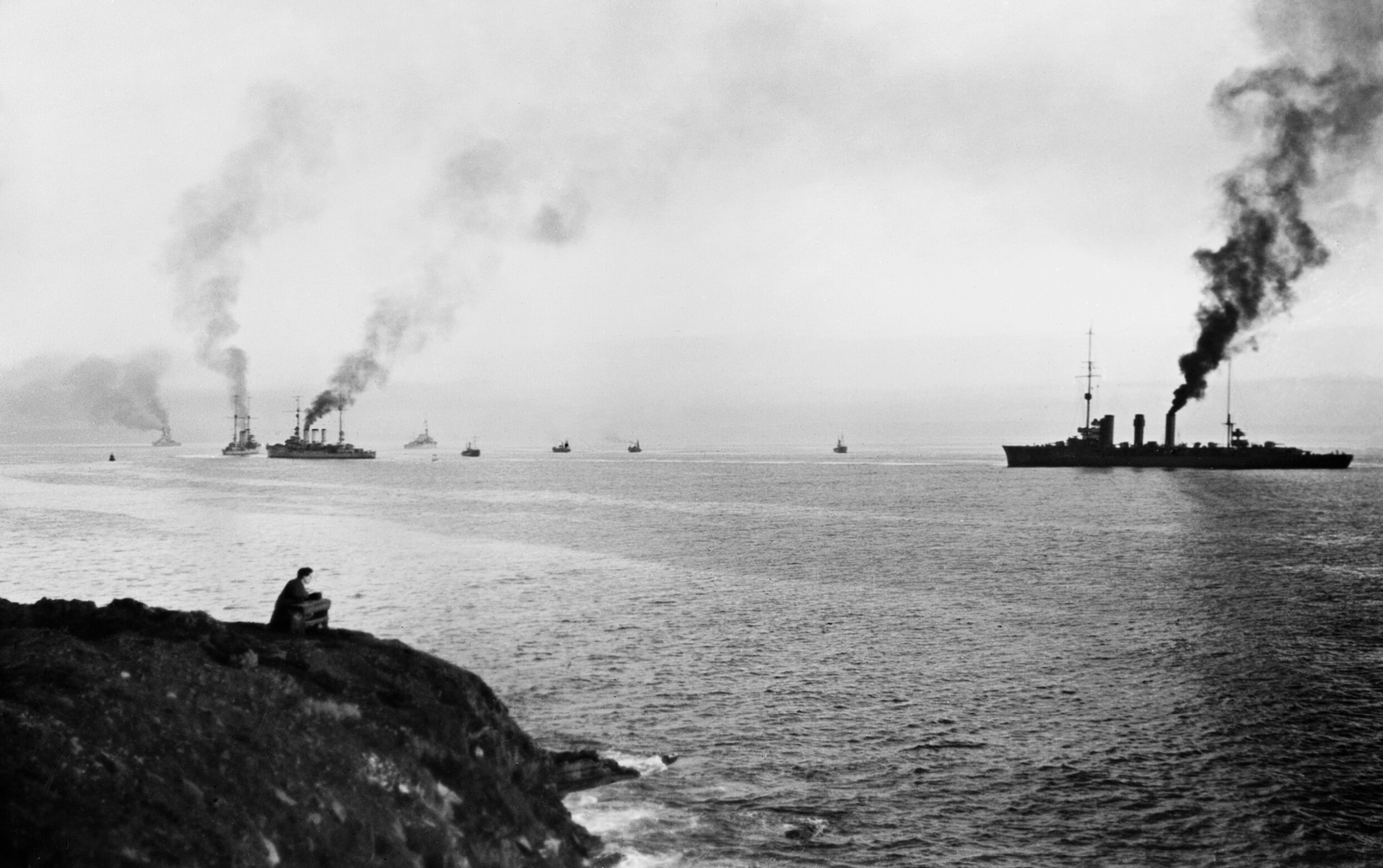
Ships of the German High Seas Fleet sailing to be interned. Visible are Emden, Frankfurt, and Bremse

After the armistice that ended the fighting on 11 November, the Allied powers demanded that the bulk of the High Seas Fleet be interned under Allied supervision; Emden was among the vessels required to be interned. She departed Germany on 19 November with the rest of the fleet, which was commanded by Konteradmiral (Rear Admiral) Ludwig von Reuter. Two days later, the ships arrived in the Firth of Forth, having been escorted across the North Sea by the Grand Fleet. Over the following days, the German ships were moved to Scapa Flow in smaller groups. Emden and several other vessels left the Forth on 26 November, and arrived in Scapa the following day.

While at Scapa Flow, the crew of the battleship Friedrich der Grosse harassed Reuter incessantly, until the British allowed him to transfer his flag to Emden on 25 March 1919, where he remained for the remainder of the internment. On 31 May, the men aboard Emden (and every other German ship in captivity) hoisted the Reichskriegsflagge (Imperial War Flag) in commemoration of the Battle of Jutland, fought three years earlier. This was in direct violation of the orders given by the British commander, who had ordered the German ensigns lowered while the fleet was in Scapa Flow.

The fleet remained interned during the negotiations that ultimately produced the Versailles Treaty. Reuter believed the British intended to seize his fleet on 21 June 1919, which was the deadline for Germany to sign the peace treaty. Unaware that the deadline had been extended to the 23rd, Reuter ordered the ships to be scuttled at the next opportunity. On the morning of 21 June the British fleet left Scapa Flow to conduct training maneuvers, and at 11:20 Reuter transmitted the order to his ships. Emden, however, did not sink; British ships towed her close to shore where she was beached and later re-floated. Too badly damaged by flooding and beaching for further service, Emden was awarded to the French Navy on 11 March 1920, as a so-called "Propaganda ship" which could be used as a target or for experimental purposes for a short time before being scrapped or sunk. She was used as an explosives testing target and ultimately broken up for scrap in Caen in 1926.
