= Orfey-class destroyer =

Class of naval warship of the Imperial Russian Navy

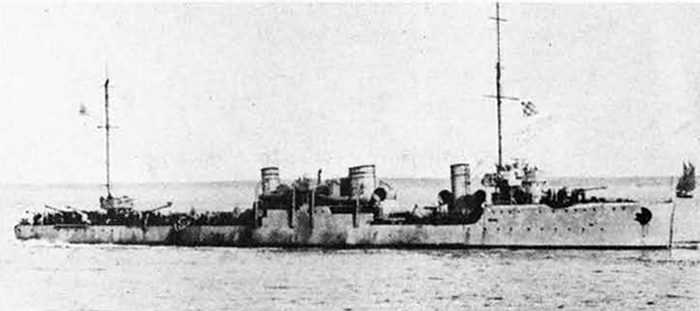
- Engels (ex-Desna)

Class overview
- Operators: Russian Navy; Soviet Navy
- Preceded by: Novik
- Succeeded by: Izyaslav class
- In commission: 1915–1956
- Completed: 8
- Lost: 4
- Scrapped: 4

General characteristics (Orfey as completed)
- Type: Destroyer
- Displacement: 1,260 t (1,240 long tons)
- Length: 98 m (321 ft 6 in)
- Beam: 9.34 m (30 ft 8 in)
- Draught: 2.93 m (9 ft 7 in)
- Installed power: 4 Normand boilers; 32,000 PS (24,000 kW)
- Propulsion: 2 shafts, 2 steam turbines
- Speed: 31 knots (57 km/h; 36 mph)
- Range: 1,680 nmi (3,110 km; 1,930 mi) at 21 knots (39 km/h; 24 mph)
- Complement: 150
- Armament: 4 × single 102 mm (4 in) guns; 2 × single 7.62 mm (0.3 in) machine guns; 3 × triple 450 mm (17.7 in) torpedo tubes; 80 × naval mines

The Orfey-class destroyers were built for the Baltic Fleet of the Imperial Russian Navy. They were modified versions of the earlier destroyer Novik and the Derzky-class destroyers. These ships were larger, had triple torpedo tubes and an extra 102 mm (4 in) gun. One ship, Engels, was fitted with a 305 mm (12 in) recoilless rifle for testing in 1934. Eight ships were completed during World War I, one of which was sunk during the Battle of Kassar Wiek. One ship fought against the Allied intervention in the Russian Civil War.

Two ships were scrapped after the Russian Civil War; the five survivors participated in World War II.

== Design and description ==
The Orfey-class ships were designed as an improved version of the Derzky class. Orfey normally displaced 1,260 metric tons (1,240 long tons) and 1,568 t (1,543 long tons) at full load. She measured 98 meters (321 ft 6 in) long overall with a beam of 9.34 meters (30 ft 8 in), and a draft of 3 meters (9 ft 10 in). The Orfeys were propelled by two Curtis-AEG-Vulkan steam turbines, each driving one propeller using steam from four Normand boilers at a working pressure of 17 standard atmospheres (1,723 kPa; 250 psi). The turbines were designed to produce a total of 32,000 metric horsepower (24,000 kW) for an intended maximum speed of 35 knots (65 km/h; 40 mph) using forced draft. During their sea trials, they only reached 31 knots (57 km/h; 36 mph). The ships carried between 159–350 t (156–344 long tons) of fuel oil which gave them a range of 1,680 nautical miles (3,110 km; 1,930 mi) at 21 knots (39 km/h; 24 mph). Their crew numbered 150.

The Orfey-class ships were originally intended to have an armament of two 60-caliber 102-millimeter (four in) Pattern 1911 Obukhov guns, one gun each on the forecastle and stern, a pair of 7.62-millimeter (0.3 in) Maxim machine guns on single mounts, and a dozen 450-millimeter (17.7 in) torpedo tubes in six double mounts. The Naval General Staff changed this to four triple mounts once they became available in 1914. Based on a battle between the destroyer Novik and two German destroyers in August 1915, they decided to exchange the rearmost torpedo mount for two more 102 mm guns on the stern while the ships were still under construction. All of these guns were on the centerline and the stern guns interfered with each other's movements. It had a rate of fire of 12–15 rounds per minute. They fired 17.5-kilogram (39 lb) shells out to a range of 16,095 m (17,602 yd) at an elevation of +30°. Each ship stowed 150 rounds per gun.

Pobeditel and Zabiyaka were finished before the change was formally ordered and were completed to the 1914 specification with two guns and four triple torpedo mounts. The final configuration of the Orfeys' torpedo suite was one mount between the forward funnels and two mounts aft of the rear funnel. This change was implemented aboard Grom and Orfey while they were fitting out in early 1916; these four ships were fitted with three reload torpedoes. The other four ships, Letun, Azard, Desna, and Samson were built to the final configuration without reloads. They probably most often used the M1912 torpedo which had a 100-kilogram (220 lb) warhead. It had three speed/range settings: 6,000 metres (6,600 yd) at 28 knots (52 km/h; 32 mph); 5,000 metres (5,500 yd) at 30 knots (56 km/h; 35 mph) and 2,000 metres (2,200 yd) at 43 knots (80 km/h; 49 mph). The Orfey class could carry 80 M1912 naval mines or 50 larger ones. They were also fitted with a 2.7-meter (9 ft) Barr and Stroud rangefinder and two 60-centimeter (24 in) searchlights.

The Naval General Staff made no provision for anti-aircraft defense in the design of the Orfeys. This was remedied by an order issued on 8 March 1916 for a 39-caliber 40-millimeter (1.6 in) Vickers anti-aircraft (AA) gun to be fitted on a platform between the rear torpedo mount and the stern guns. These guns proved to be unreliable and were replaced during 1917 by 38-caliber 63-millimeter (2.5 in) Pattern 1916 AA guns in Grom and Pobeditel while Orfey, Zabiyaka and Azard received 76-millimeter (3 in) Lender AA guns. It is uncertain if Letun, Samson or Desna received the Vickers gun during the war, but Samson had a Lender gun installed during 1917.

The "pom-pom" fired its 2-pound (0.91 kg) shells at a rate of 300 rounds per minute out to 6,300 m (6,900 yd) at an elevation of +45°. The Lender gun's muzzle velocity of 588 m/s (1,930 ft/s) gave it a range of 6,100 m (6,700 yd) with its 6.5-kilogram (14 lb) shell. It had a practical rate of fire of 10–12 rounds per minute. The Pattern 1916 gun used a 4.04-kilogram (8.9 lb) shell that was fired at a velocity of 686 m/s (2,250 ft/s) to a range of 6,804 metres (7,441 yd) at an elevation of 20°.

== Ships ==
Built at Metal Works, St Petersburg (Petrograd)

Construction data
Ship	Name in Soviet service	Laid down	Launched	Completed	Fate
Pobiditel	Volodarsky	November 1913	23 October 1914	25 October 1915	Sunk by a mine, 28 August 1941
Zabiyaka	Uritski	November 1913	23 October 1914	9 November 1915	transferred to the Northern Fleet, sunk as a target during nuclear test in 1953
Orfey	NA	23 October 1914	5 June 1915	4 May 1916	Broken up 1929, after sustaining irreparable mine damage in 1917
Grom	NA	November 1913	15 Jun 1915	4 May 1916	Sunk during the Battle of Kassar Wiek, 14 October 1917
Letun	NA	November 1914	5 October 1915	11 July 1916	Broken up 1925, after sustaining irreparable mine damage in 1916
Desna	Engels	15 June 1915	22 October 1915	12 August 1916	Sunk by mines, 25 Aug 1941
Azard	Zinoviev renamed Artem in 1928	July 1915	23 May 1916	10 October 1916	Sunk by mines, 28 August 1941
Samson	Stalin	30 July 1915	23 May 1915	21 November 1916	transferred to the Soviet Pacific fleet via the Arctic in 1936, broken up 1953

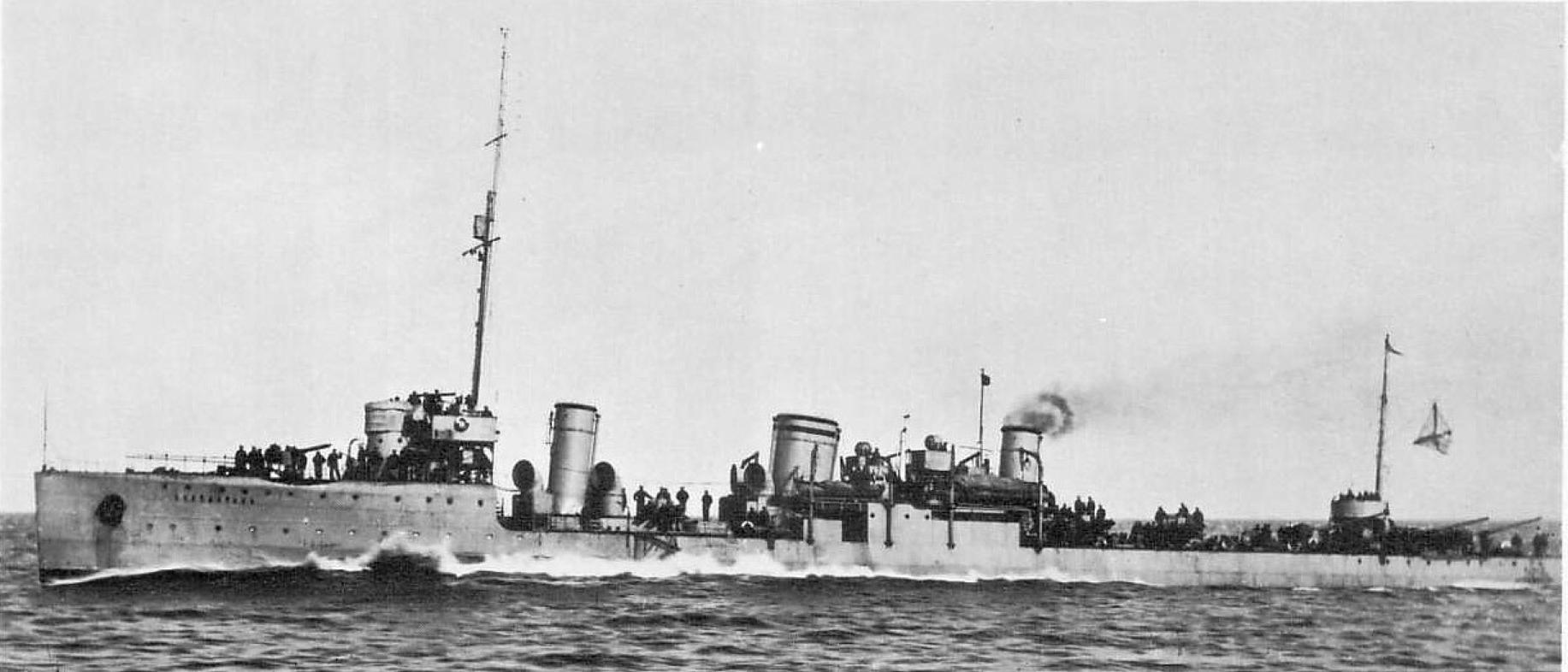
Pobeditel

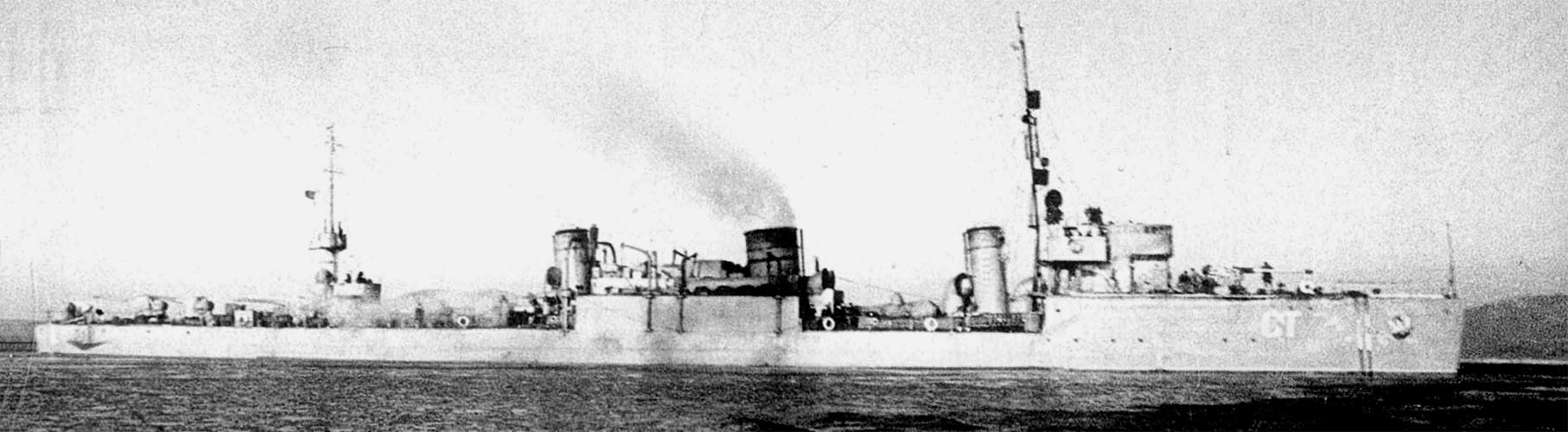
Stalin, ex-Samson

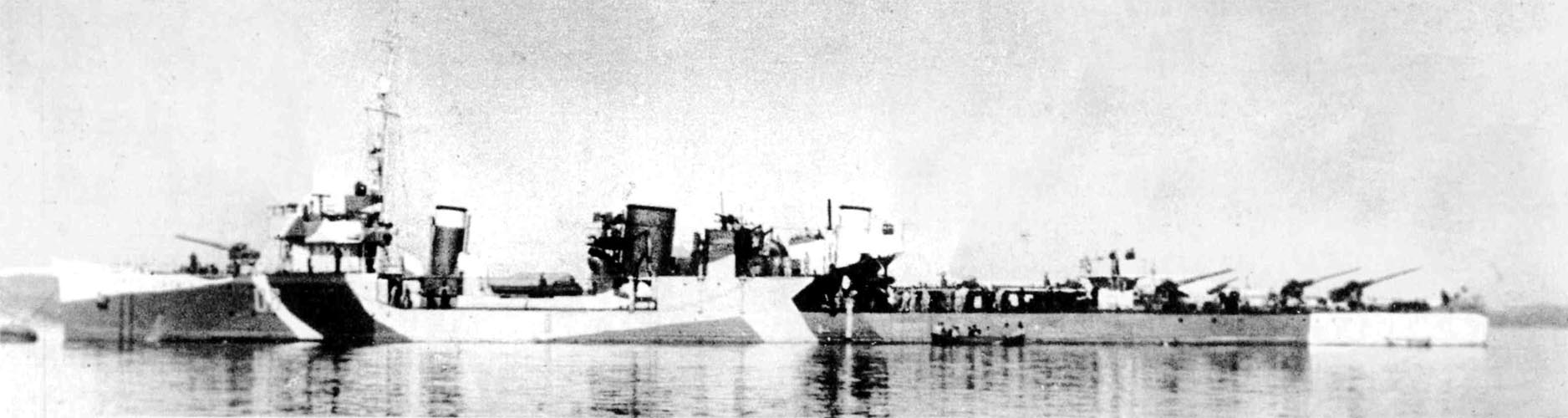
Uruitskiy

== Bibliography ==
- Apalkov, Yu. V. (1996). Боевые корабли русского флота: 8.1914-10.1917г [Combat Ships of the Russian Fleet: 8.1914-10.1917] (in Russian). ИНТЕК. ISBN 5-7559-0018-3.
- Berezhnoy, S. S. (2002). Крейсера и Миносцы: Справочик [Cruisers and Destroyers: Reference] (in Russian). Ввоенное Ииздательство. ISBN 5-203-01780-8.
- Breyer, Siegfried (1992). Soviet Warship Development: Volume 1: 1917–1937. Conway Maritime Press. ISBN 0-85177-604-3.
- Budzbon, Przemysław (2026). "The High-Speed Destroyers of the Novik Type: Part I". In Jordan, John (ed.). Warship 2026. Osprey Publishing. pp. 8–29. ISBN 978-1-4728-7259-3.
- Budzbon, Przemysław (1985). "Russia". In Gray, Randal (ed.). Conway's All the World's Fighting Ships 1906–1921. Naval Institute Press. pp. 291–325. ISBN 0-85177-245-5.
- Budzbon, Przemysław (1980). "Soviet Union". In Chesneau, Roger (ed.). Conway's All the World's Fighting Ships 1922–1946. Conway Maritime Press. pp. 318–346. ISBN 0-85177-146-7.
- Budzbon, Przemysław; Radziemski, Jan & Twardowski, Marek (2022). Warships of the Soviet Fleets 1939–1945. Vol. I: Major Combatants. Naval Institute Press. ISBN 978-1-68247-877-6.
- Campbell, John (1985). Naval Weapons of World War II. Naval Institute Press. ISBN 0-87021-459-4.
- Friedman, Norman (2011). Naval Weapons of World War One: Guns, Torpedoes, Mines and ASW Weapons of All Nations: An Illustrated Directory. Seaforth. ISBN 978-1-84832-100-7.
- Greger, René (1972). The Russian Fleet, 1914-1917. Ian Allan. ISBN 0-7110-0255-X.
- Hill, Alexander (2018). Soviet Destroyers of World War II. New Vanguard. Vol. 256. Osprey Publishing. ISBN 978-1-4728-2256-7.
- Platonov, Andrey V. (2002). Энциклопедия советских надводных кораблей 1941–1945 [Encyclopedia of Soviet Surface Ships 1941–1945] (in Russian). Poligon. ISBN 5-89173-178-9.
- Rohwer, Jürgen (2005). Chronology of the War at Sea 1939–1945: The Naval History of World War Two (Third Revised ed.). Naval Institute Press. ISBN 1-59114-119-2.
- Verstyuk, Anatoly & Gordeyev, Stanislav (2006). Корабли Минных дивизий. От "Новика" до "Гогланда" [Torpedo Division Ships: From Novik to Gogland] (in Russian). Voennaya Kniga. ISBN 5-902863-10-4.
