= Logbook (nautical) =

Log of the daily activities of a ship

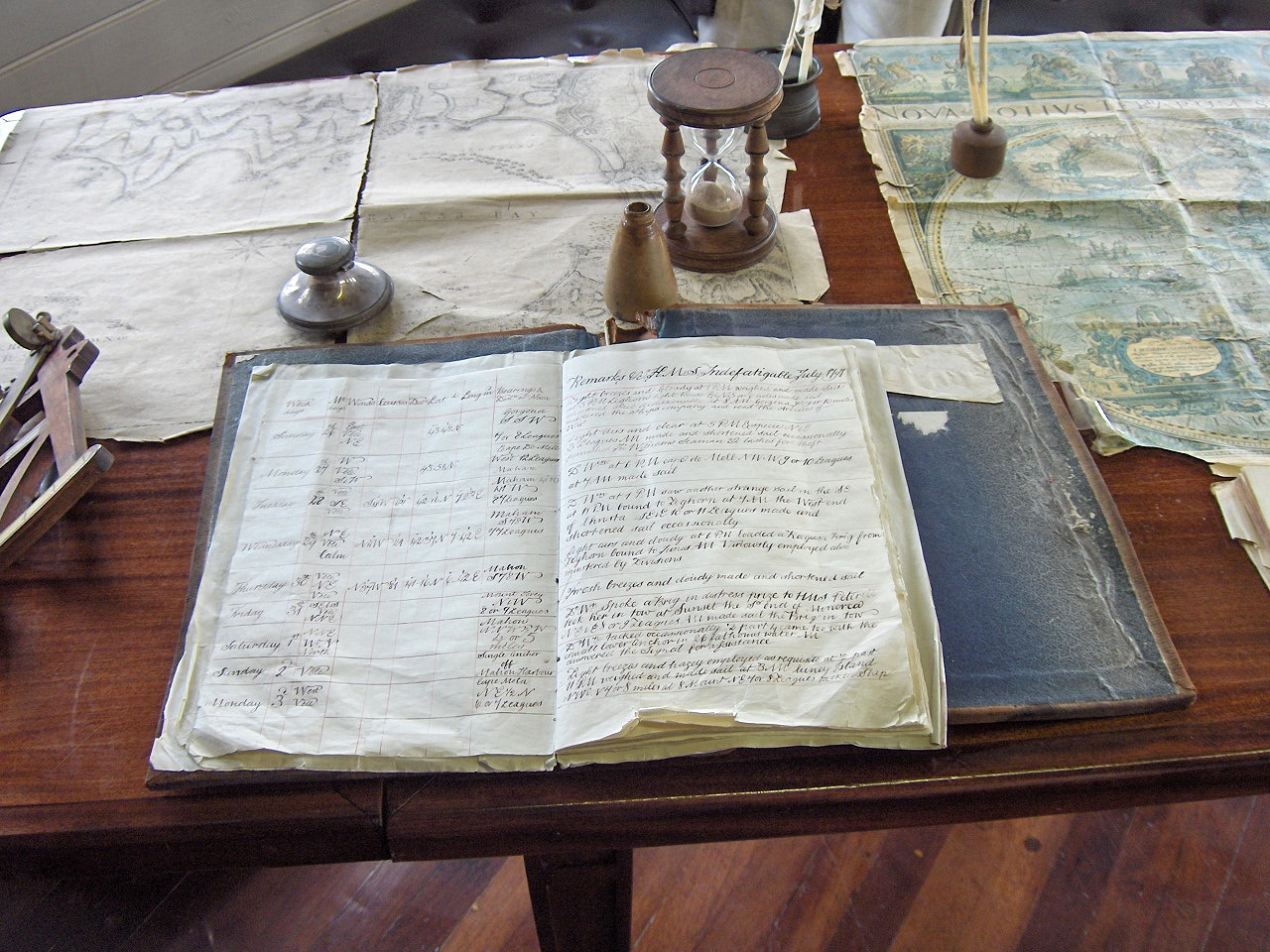
Logbook aboard the frigate Grand Turk.

A logbook (a ship's logs or simply log) is a record of important events in the management, operation, and navigation of a ship. It is essential to traditional navigation, and must be filled in at least daily.

The term originally referred to a book for recording readings from the chip log that was used to estimate a ship's speed through the water. Today's ship's log has grown to contain many other types of information, and is a record of operational data relating to a ship or submarine, such as weather conditions, times of routine events and significant incidents, crew complement or what ports were docked at and when.

The term logbook has spread to a wide variety of other usages. Today, a virtual or electronic logbook is typically used for record-keeping for complex machines such as nuclear plants or particle accelerators. In military terms, a logbook is a series of official and legally binding documents. Each document (usually arranged by date) is marked with the time of an event or action of significance.

== Shipping ==
Most national shipping authorities and admiralties specify that logbooks are kept to provide a record of events, and to help crews navigate should radio, radar or the GPS fail. Examination of the detail in a ship's log is often an important part of the investigative process for official maritime inquiries, in much the same way as a "black box" is used on airplanes. Logbook entries are sometimes of great importance in legal cases involving maritime commercial disputes.

Commercial ships and naval vessels often keep a "rough log", – or "scrap log" – a preliminary draft of the ship's course, speed, location, and other data, which is then transcribed as the "smooth log", – or "official log" – the final version of the ship's record. Changes may be made to the rough log but the smooth log is considered permanent and no erasures are permitted. Alterations or corrections in an official logbook must be initialled by the authorised keeper of the logbook and the original data entries which have been cancelled or corrected must remain legible.

== In fiction ==
- The Hornblower series mentions logs to explain plot development, or to make the story more realistic.
- In Star Trek, the captain's log, a form of ship's log, is used to fill in the audience as to the events in progress, and acts as a diegetic form of soliloquy. This is part of a larger log system that includes personal logs (a sort of journal) and other officers' official logs, for stories that could not believably be reflected in the official Captain's log.

== See also ==
- Binnacle
- CLIWOC (climatological database for the world's oceans)
- Electronic logbook
- Patent log, instruments used to measure the speed of a ship
- Periplus, various ancient logs valuable for ethno- and geographic information included with the itineraries
- Navigation
