= Gleźnowo =

- Village
- Location within Poland
- Coordinates: 54°20′3″N 16°19′2″E
- Country: Poland
- Voivodeship: West Pomeranian
- County: Sławno
- Gmina: Darłowo
- Population: 198

Gleźnowo [ɡlɛʑˈnɔvɔ] (formerly German Steinort) is a village in the administrative district of Gmina Darłowo, within Sławno County, West Pomeranian Voivodeship, in north-western Poland. It lies approximately 12 km (7 mi) south-west of Darłowo, 25 km (16 mi) west of Sławno, and 153 km (95 mi) north-east of the regional capital Szczecin.

For the history of the region, see History of Pomerania.

The village has a population of 198.
