= Kommodore =

Highest senior officer rank in the German Kriegsmarine

Commodore Kommodore
- Rank flag

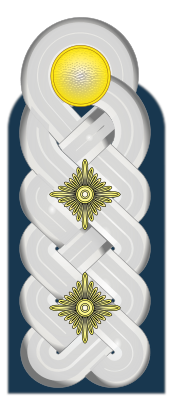
- Shoulder board and sleeve insignia
- Country: Nazi Germany
- Service branch: Kriegsmarine
- Rank group: Senior officer
- Next higher rank: Konteradmiral
- Next lower rank: Kapitän zur See
- Equivalent ranks: Oberführer

Kommodore was the highest senior officer rank (German: Stabsoffizier-Rang) in the German Kriegsmarine, comparable to commodore in anglophone naval forces. There was no counterpart in the German Heer and Luftwaffe, but Kommodore would have been comparable to Oberführer in the Waffen-SS.

== History ==
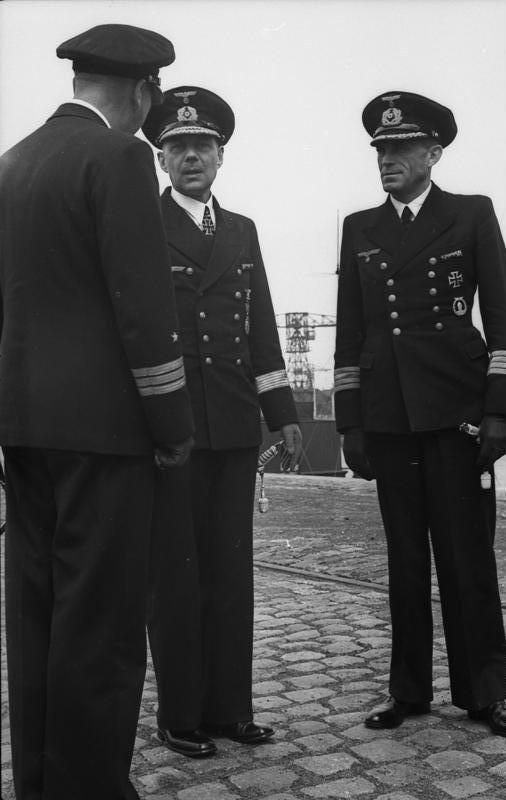
Kommodore F. Ruge (middle)

Kommodore originated as a title used by some Kapitän zur See and Korvettenkapitän of the Prussian Navy and the Kaiserliche Marine (Imperial Navy) during the 19th and early 20th centuries.

A German Kommodore could hold any naval rank between lieutenant and captain and the title of Kommodore was held by those officers who held tactical control over more than one vessel. This was most common with U-boat commanders in charge of several submarines that were assigned to a single task force. In the 19th century, German officers of this rank were referred to as fleet captains (Flottenkapitän).

By World War II, Kommodore had at last become an actual - though rarely used - rank in the Kriegsmarine. The position was considered that of a senior captain, with insignia being the shoulder boards of a Kapitän zur See with one thick admiral's rank stripe (52 mm) on the sleeve. German commodores also were permitted to wear greatcoat lapels and visor insignia of an admiral but were not officially members of the German admiralty. Probably the most prominent holder of this rank was Karl Dönitz, who became Kommodore and Führer der Unterseeboote (commander of submarines) on 28 January 1939; however, he held the rank for just over eight months until 1 October 1939, when he was promoted to Konteradmiral.

The World War II rank of Kommodore existed in a grey zone of seniority, since neither of the other two branches of the Wehrmacht (Heer and Luftwaffe) had equivalent ranks; thus, it was very similar to the S.S. rank of Oberführer.

After the fall of Nazi Germany, and the rebuilding of the German Navy, Kommodore fell into disuse as a rank, effectively being replaced by the Flottillenadmiral which is the lowest flag rank. It reappeared as a title in the 1950s. In the modern age, a German commodore is a senior captain who holds the rank of captain but holds such positions as a naval squadron commander.

== Kriegsmarine rank insignia ==
The rank insignia consisted of shoulder strap and sleeve lace. Shoulder straps, corresponding to those of Kapitän zur See, had to be worn on uniform jackets and consisted of twisted silver braids with two gold pips (stars) on padding in navy blue Waffenfarbe. Cuff insignia consisted of one five-pointed star above a big gold lace. The sleeve rings encircled the lower cuffs.

The sequence of ranks in decreasing order of seniority was:

- Konteradmiral/ Generalmajor (Note: The contemporary German Armed Forces use the OF-6 ranks of Flotillenadmiral and Brigadegeneral while Konteradmiral and Generalmajor are ranked as OF-7.)
- Kommodore / no Heer or Luftwaffe equivalent
- Kapitän zur See / Oberst
