= Leningradsky Metallichesky Zavod =

LMZ
- Type: Subsidiary
- Industry: Power engineering
- Founded: 1857
- Headquarters: St Petersburg
- Key people: Roman Filippov
- Products: power generation & transmission equipments
- Parent: Power Machines
- Website: www.power-m.ru/eng/company/lmz.aspx/

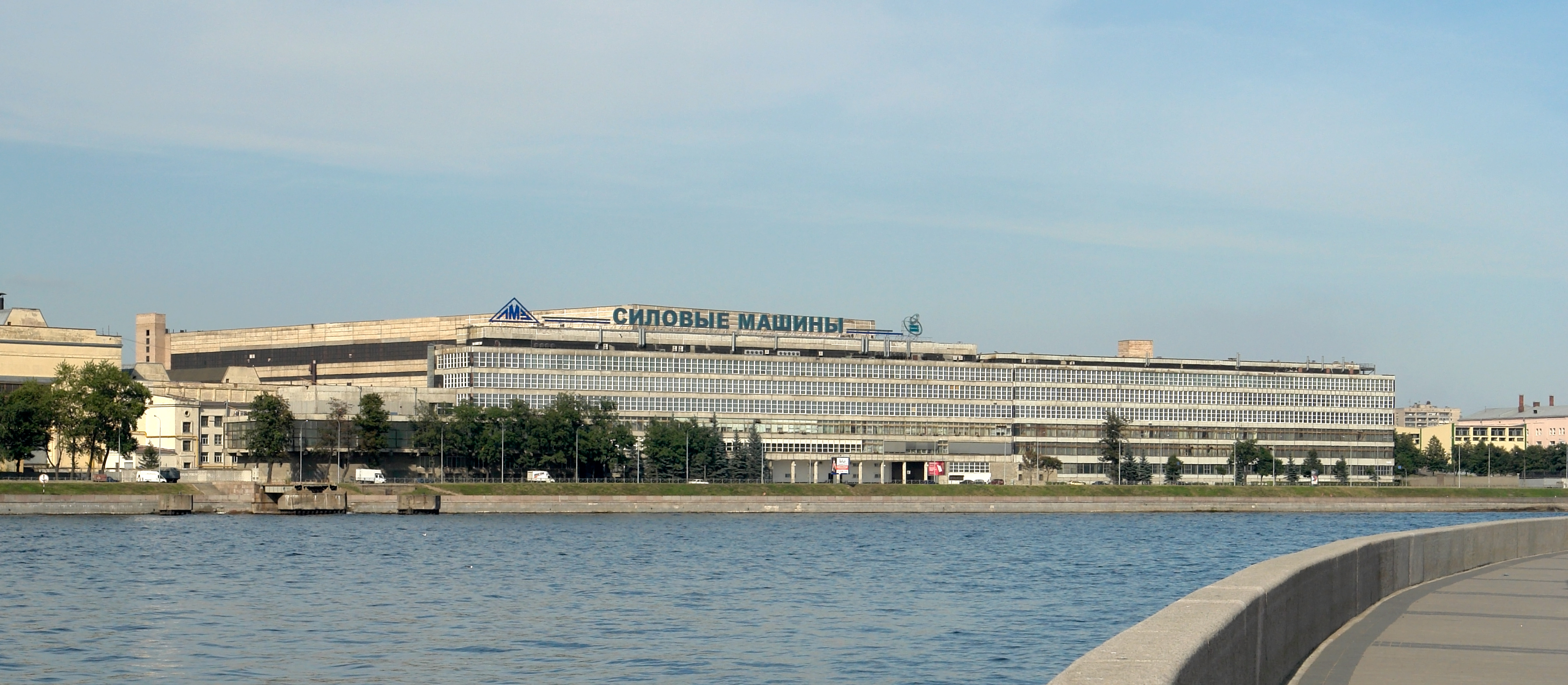
LMZ plant building on Sverdlovskaya embankment in Saint Petersburg

Leningradsky Metallichesky Zavod (Russian: Ленинградский Металлический Завод), also known as LMZ, is the largest Russian manufacturer of power machines and turbines for electric power stations.

== History ==
The company was founded in 1857, in Saint Petersburg, Russia as a boiler works and small foundry. The industry is still located on the original site, on the right bank of the Neva River, in St. Petersburg. Steam turbines have been produced here since 1907 when the company was licensed to build French Rateau turbines. At the same time it began to build gun turrets, gun mountings and torpedo tubes. In 1912 the company received a contract for a number of Orfey-class destroyers originally designed by AG Vulcan Stettin. It contracted at the same time with Vulcan to build a shipyard as well as for licenses for Curtis-AEG-Vulcan turbines and Vulcan-Yarrow boilers. In 1914 the company was renamed Petrograd Metal Works (Petrogradskiy Metallicheskiy Zavod) when Saint Petersburg was renamed as Petrograd. At the beginning of World War I the company had 4 building slips and employed 5,500 workers.

Water turbines for various Hydropower Stations, have been produced since 1924. Since 1957, the LMZ has also produced gas turbines. Since 2000, LMZ is a division of the Power Machines company, based in Russia.

Awards

Order of Lenin (1945),

Order of Lenin (1957),

Order of the October Revolution (1971).

== International business ==
About 700 turbines made by LMZ are now working at hundreds of electric power plants in more than 80 countries around the world. 2,300 power turbines were produced at the LMZ plant all together, with their total installed capacity of 300,000,000 KW. Most of the turbines are working at electric power stations in Russia, as well as in all other states of the former Soviet Union.

The company is currently a minor player in the global market for electric turbines. According to industry rankings by Platts in various years from 2008-2010, LMZ was not listed among the significant manufacturers of steam, gas or hydro turbines by worldwide market share.

As of 2021, LMZ is developing a 1255 MWe low-speed high-power turbine for the VVER-TOI nuclear reactor. The design allows for growth to a capacity of 1800 MWe, and complements its existing high-speed turbines.

== Consequences of continuation of business after Russia's Invasion of Ukraine ==
On July 13, 2022, the notorious Anonymous aligned hacktivist group NB65 stated they had hacked LMZ as a result of Russia's Invasion of Ukraine. NB65 claimed (via Twitter) to have infiltrated their entire network, including usernames, passwords, emails, and communications, with multiple photos to provide evidence. In addition, LMZ's official website was taken over by NB65, with a photo of a Ukrainian flag and a message to LMZ, referencing the invasion. They also published a photo of an email from an employee at LMZ, showing their intention to produce gunpowder. NB65 also claimed to have access to all of LMZ's contracts, financials and proprietary designs for tech they manufacture. They stated on Twitter they had intended on leaking all the data they had accessed to the public.

== Bibliography ==
- de Saint Hubert, Christian & Drashpil, Boris V. (1985). "Main Shipyards, Enginebuilders and Manufacturers of Guns and Armour Plate in the Saint Petersburg Area Up to 1917". Warship International. XXII (4). Toledo, Ohio: International Naval Research Organization: 333–60. ISSN 0043-0374.
