= Draft (boiler) =

Pressure difference

In a water boiler, draft is the difference between atmospheric pressure and the pressure existing in the furnace or flue gas passage. Draft can also be referred to as the difference in pressure in the combustion chamber area which results in the motion of the flue gases and the air flow.

== Types of draft ==
Drafts are produced by the rising combustion gases in the stack, flue, or by mechanical means. For example, a boiler can be put into four categories: natural, induced, balanced, and forced.

- Natural draft: When air or flue gases flow due to the difference in density of the hot flue gases and cooler ambient gases. The difference in density creates a pressure differential that moves the hotter flue gases into the cooler surroundings.
- Forced draft: When air or flue gases are maintained above atmospheric pressure. Normally it is done with the help of a forced draft fan.
- Induced draft: When air or flue gases flow under the effect of a gradually decreasing pressure below atmospheric pressure. In this case, the system is said to operate under induced draft. The stacks (or chimneys) provide sufficient natural draft to meet the low draft loss needs. In order to meet higher pressure differentials, the stacks must simultaneously operate with draft fans.
- Balanced draft: When the static pressure is equal to the atmospheric pressure, the system is referred to as balanced draft. Draft is said to be zero in this system.

== Importance/significance ==
For the proper and the optimized heat transfer from the flue gases to the boiler tubes draft holds a relatively high amount of significance. The combustion rate of the flue gases and the amount of heat transfer to the boiler are both dependent on the movement and motion of the flue gases. A boiler equipped with a combustion chamber which has a strong current of air (draft) through the fuel bed will increase the rate of combustion (which is the efficient utilization of fuel with minimum waste of unused fuel). The stronger movement will also increase the heat transfer rate from the flue gases to the boiler (which improves efficiency and circulation).

== Drafting in steam locomotives ==
Since the stack of a locomotive is too short to provide natural draft, during normal running forced draft is achieved by directing the exhaust steam from the cylinders through a cone ("blast pipe") upwards and into a skirt at the bottom of the stack. When the locomotive is stationary or in a restricted space "live" steam from the boiler is directed through an annular ring surrounding the blast pipe to produce the same effect.

== See also ==
- Cooling tower system
- Stack effect
- Controlling draught
