= Raid on Kronstadt =

1919 British raid on the Bolshevik Baltic Fleet

- Part of British campaign in the Baltic (1918–1919)
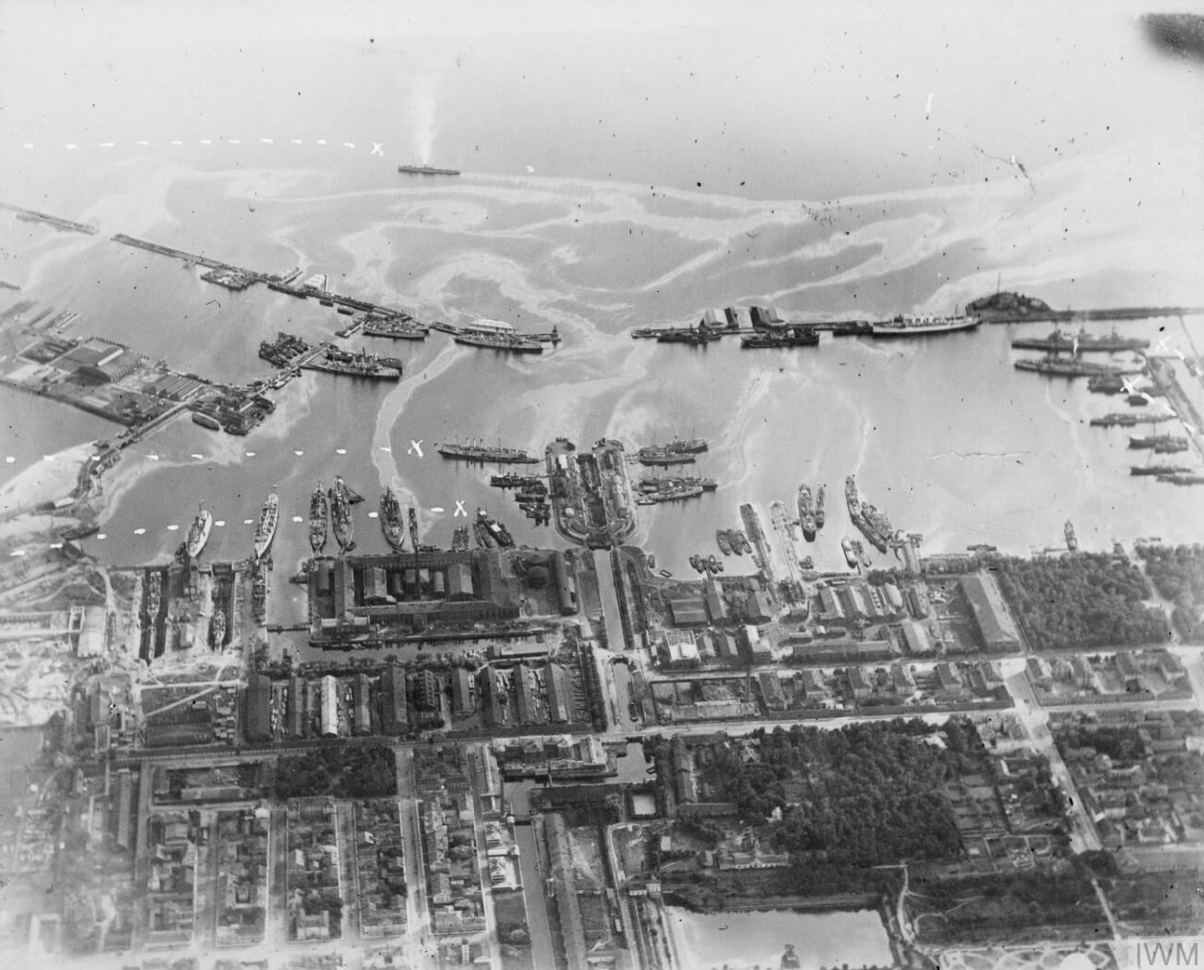
- Aerial photograph of Kronstadt harbour taken on 26 July 1919. The positions of Soviet vessels did not change significantly before the raid. The depot ship Pamiat Azova is berthed at the end of the central pier (right of the middle 'x'), the battleships Petropavlovsk and Andrei Pervozvanny are moored at the end of the pier on the right. A guardship lies just outside the harbour.
Date	18 August 1919
Location	Kronstadt, Russia

Belligerents
United Kingdom	Russian SFSR

Commanders and leaders
Claude Congreve Dobson; Grahame Donald	-

Strength
8 coastal motor boats 12 aircraft	-

Casualties and losses
3 coastal motor boats sunk 7–10 killed 9 captured	1 battleship damaged 1 submarine depot ship sunk

The raid on Kronstadt (also known as Operation RK or the Scooter Raid) was an attack by Royal Navy coastal motor boats (CMBs) and Royal Air Force aircraft on the Bolshevik Baltic Fleet at its home base on 18 August 1919. After the Allied intervention in the Russian Civil War, Allied naval units operated in the Baltic Sea to support the independence of Estonia and Latvia, which were threatened by Bolshevik movements. The raid followed a similar one carried out by a single motor torpedo boat outside the harbour on 17 June 1919, in which Lieutenant Augustus Agar's CMB-4 sank the Bolshevik cruiser Oleg.

The raid on 18 August 1919 was carried out by a newly arrived force of seven larger CMBs under Commander Claude Congreve Dobson, guided by Agar in CMB-4. One CMB broke down en route to the harbour but the remaining six penetrated the defences and scored hits on the submarine depot ship Pamiat Azova, which sank, and the battleship Andrei Pervozvanny, which was damaged. A simultaneous air raid by the Royal Air Force damaged a destroyer. Three of the British CMBs were sunk by Bolshevik fire or collision with each other and up to ten British personnel were killed and nine captured.

The raid was regarded as a British success, with the Baltic Fleet afterwards largely confined to the harbour for the rest of the campaign. Of the 55 British participants 48 received gallantry medals or were mentioned in despatches.

== Background ==
=== Initial intervention ===
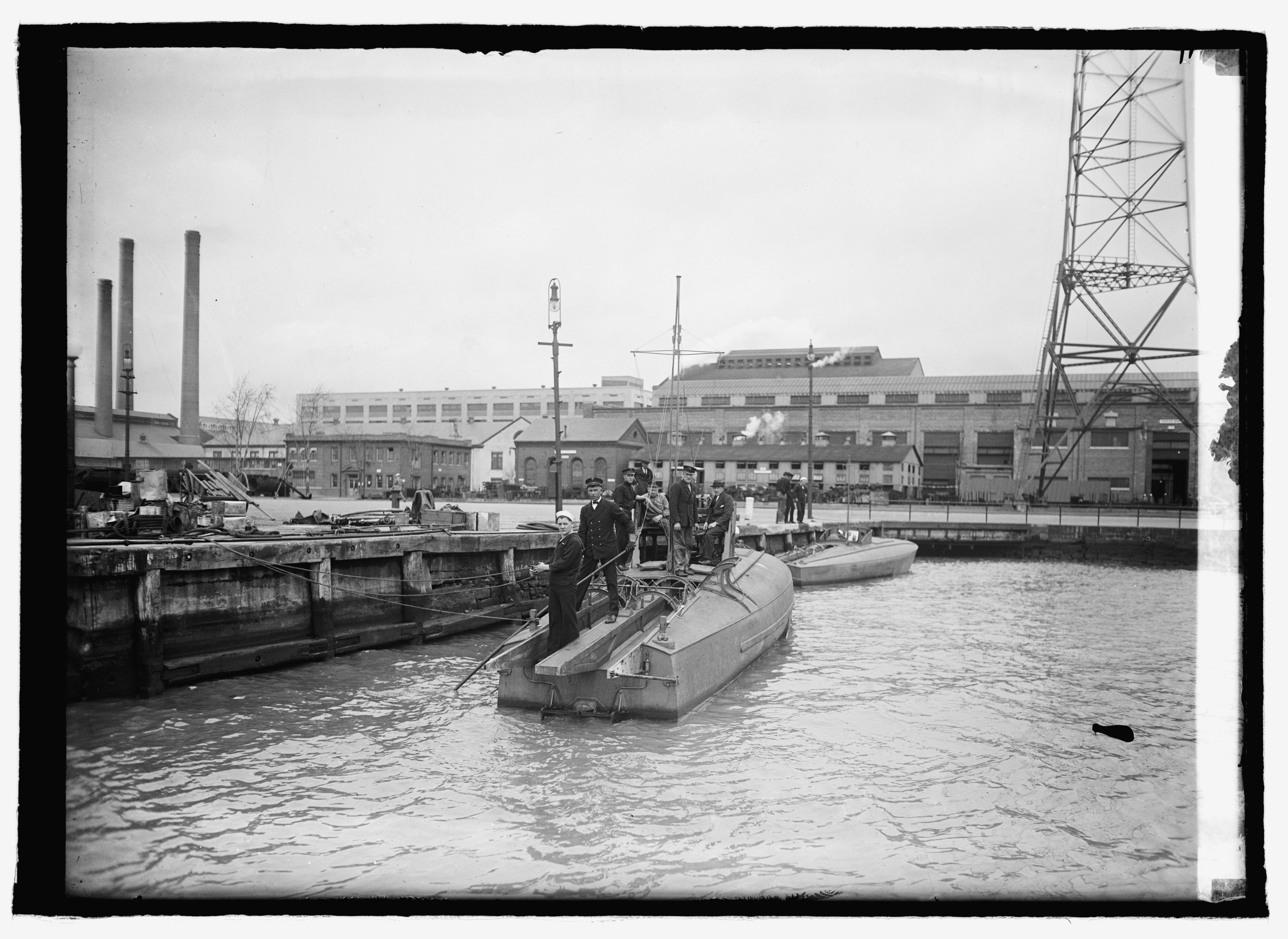
Two CMBs, a two-torpedo version (foreground) and single-torpedo version (rear)

The Allies had intervened in the Russian Civil War since January 1918. The British campaign in the Baltic began on 26 November 1918, just 15 days after the end of the First World War, when a squadron under Rear Admiral Edwyn Alexander-Sinclair departed Britain. Alexander-Sinclair's force was meant as a show of strength against the Bolsheviks and in support of Estonian and Latvian independence, which was threatened following the withdrawal of German garrisons. Alexander-Sinclair's ships delivered ammunition to the Estonians, bombarded Bolshevik positions and evacuated the Latvian government, ahead of advancing Bolshevik troops. The force also engaged the Bolshevik Baltic Fleet at Reval (now Tallinn) and captured two destroyers before the fleet withdrew into their icebound winter quarters at Kronstadt. Alexander-Sinclair was replaced by Rear Admiral Walter Cowan in January 1919.

Cowan was frustrated by his confusing orders from London and the complex political situation. He was reinforced with a French squadron, but the French made it clear that they were unwilling to engage in open hostilities against the Bolshevik forces. In spring 1919 the Bolshevik Baltic fleet sortied and, though the conflict was inconclusive, it spurred Cowan to look for a forward base for his ships. He received permission from the Finns to establish a position at the Bjorko islands (modern-day Beryozovye Islands, Russia). Cowan received reinforcements in early June in the form of two 40 ft (12 m) coastal motor boats (CMBs) - CMB-4 and CMB-7 - under the overall command of Lieutenant Augustus Agar. These were small, fast - capable of 25 knots (46 km/h; 29 mph) - and lightly armed vessels; each carried a machine gun and one British 18-inch torpedo. Agar's instructions were to establish a ferry service for information and agents from Terijoki in Finland into Bolshevik-controlled territory, including Kronstadt.

=== Agar's raid ===
Cowan kept the CMBs in mind for an active combat role as they were capable of sailing through Bolshevik minefields without detonating them. On 13 June the Bolshevik garrison at Krasnaya Gorka fort, guarding the seaward approach to Kronstadt, mutinied. The Baltic Fleet's battleships Petropavlovsk and Andrei Pervozvanny bombarded the fort on 15 June. Cowan seized the chance and despatched Agar against the vessels; the operation was called off when CMB-7 was damaged by debris.

On the night of 16/17 June CMB-4 attacked alone. Agar evaded the Bolshevik destroyer screen but CMB-4 suffered a mechanical failure. Agar moored to a breakwater for 20 minutes, in full view of the Bolshevik vessels, to carry out repairs before resuming his attack. The battleships had returned to Kronstadt but Agar struck the cruiser Oleg with a torpedo. Oleg sank and Agar successfully returned to base, winning the Victoria Cross for his actions and a £5,000 bounty on his head from the Bolsheviks. The action did not affect the battle for the fort, which had already surrendered.

=== Reinforcements ===
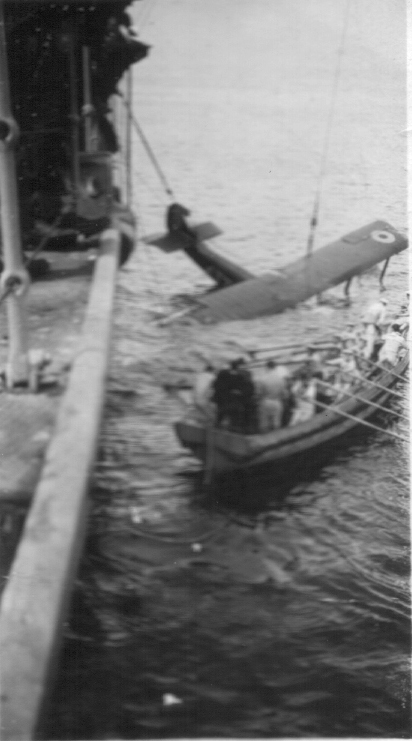
An aircraft returning to Vindictive, ditched in the sea

Cowan was reinforced with the arrival of the aircraft carrier Vindictive in July carrying 12 aircraft, a mix of Sopwith Camels, Sopwith 1½ Strutters, Port Victoria Grain Griffins and Short Type 184s. The air component was commanded by Major Grahame Donald of the Royal Air Force. An air base was constructed at Koivisto, near Bjorko, with the aircraft operating in the meantime from the carrier. Donald carried out two air raids on Kronstadt on 30 July but heavy anti-aircraft fire was reported and no damage was inflicted. Later that day Cowan was reinforced again with a number of minelaying destroyers from the 20th Flotilla. These had towed seven larger 55 ft (17 m) CMBs from Britain, under the command of Commander Claude Congreve Dobson. These larger vessels - of 11 long tons (11 t) displacement compared to the 40 ft (12 m) CMBs 5 long tons (5.1 t) - were capable of speeds of 35–40 knots (65–74 km/h; 40–46 mph) and carried up to two torpedoes. Cowan had requested the vessels following the success of Agar's raid.

During the next few weeks Cowan carried out bombardments of Ingermanland and patrolled Koporye Bay and Seiskari Island in case the Baltic Fleet put to sea. The Bolsheviks remained in harbour at Kronstadt, apart from occasional submarine patrols, so Cowan decided to use his new resources to attack the fleet there.

== Raid ==
=== Preparations ===
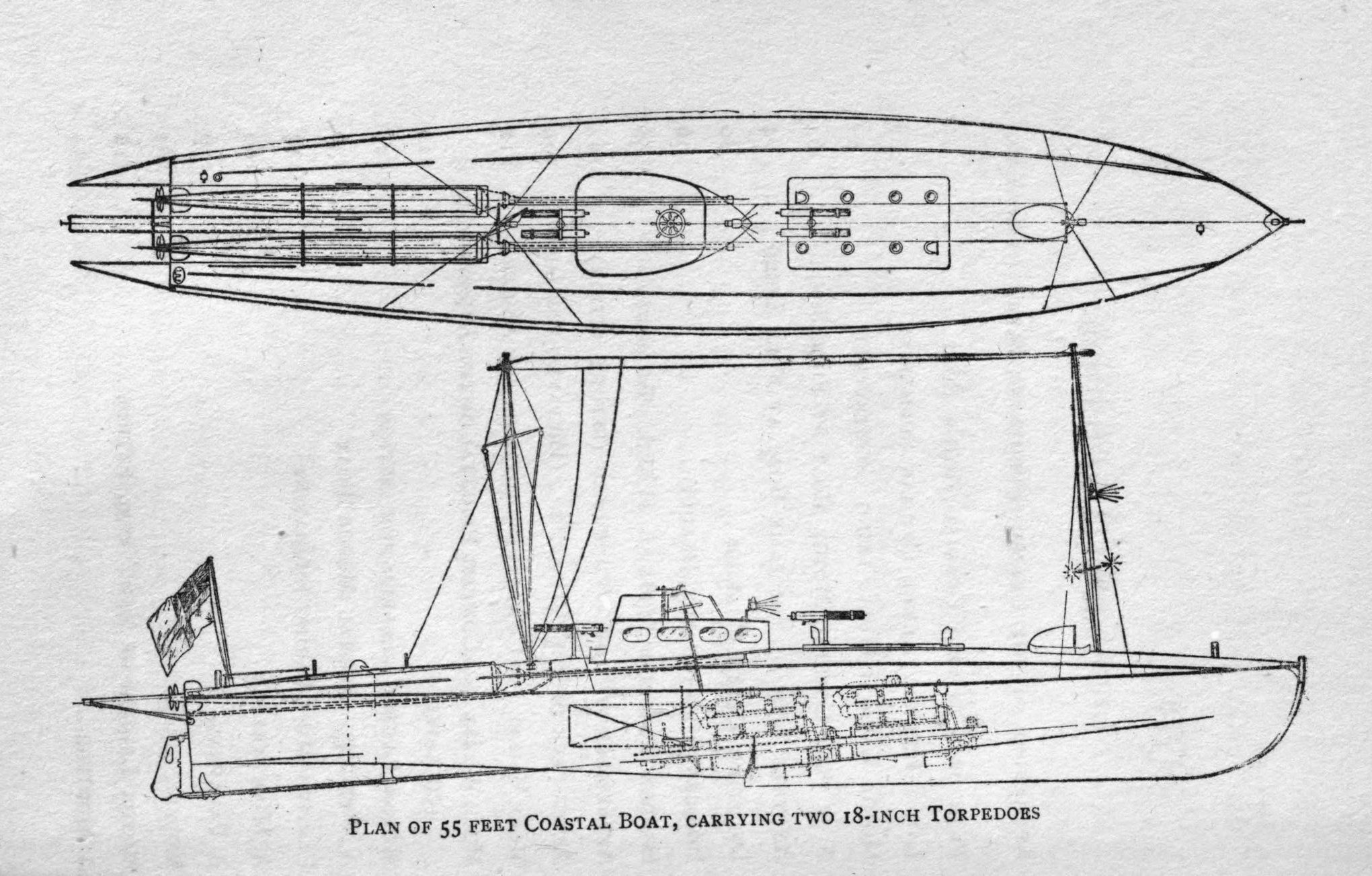
Plans of a 55ft CMB

The raid, known as Operation RK, was planned on board Vindictive. The operation was originally planned to take place on the night of 15/16 August but was postponed due to heavy rain. The raid began at 1 am on 18 August as Dobson led seven CMBs from Bjorko. Agar, commanding an eighth vessel, CMB-4, served as a guide through the minefields around Kotlin Island, which the boats passed to the north of. As the CMBs passed the island an air raid on Kronstadt, intended as a diversion, was launched by Donald's 12 aircraft.

One vessel, CMB-86, was lost to mechanical failure en route and the attack was carried out by two waves of three boats. The first wave consisted of CMB-31 under Dobson, CMB-79 under Lieutenant Bremner and CMB-88 under Lieutenant Dayrell-Reed. The second wave consisted of CMB-24 under Lieutenant Napier, CMB-62 under Lieutenant Commander Brade and CMB-72 under Sub-Lieutenant Bodley. All of these vessels carried two torpedoes, except CMB-79 which carried one. As well as a three-man crew (two officers and an enlisted engineer) each boat carried a Finnish smuggler as a guide. The night was dark and sea conditions were flat and calm.

=== First wave ===
Just after 1.00 am Dobson led the first wave through the harbour entrance, speeding past the guardship, the destroyer Gavriil. The submarine depot ship Pamiat Azova was moored directly opposite the entrance and was hit amidships by a torpedo fired by CMB-79, sinking her. This alerted the Bolsheviks who opened a heavy fire on CMB-31 and CMB-88. The defenders were hindered by the loss of many of the 11.9 inches (300 mm) and 6 inches (150 mm) guns from the coastal forts to help equip the army and by the fact that many of the remaining guns in the forts and on vessels could not depress low enough to engage the CMBs or else could not fire without risking friendly fire.

CMB-31, piloted by Lieutenant Russell Hamilton McBean (as Dobson was in overall command), and CMB-88 moved eastwards to the battleships moorings. From around 100 yd/m range CMB-31 launched two torpedoes at the Andrei Pervozvanny, one of which struck her bow and caused flooding. CMB-88 was illuminated by a Bolshevik searchlight which concentrated the defenders fire upon it. The light was destroyed by a British aircraft strafing attack but not before CMB-88 had been hit, killing Dayrell-Reed. His second-in-command Lieutenant Gordon Charles Steele, moved his body out of the helmsman's seat and took control. Steele launched two torpedoes at the Bolshevik battleship Petropavlovsk but these both missed, striking the harbour wall.

=== Second wave ===
The first wave was leaving the harbour as the second wave arrived. CMB-72 was hit when entering the harbour, rendering her torpedo launch system inoperative, and circled to starboard to leave again. As CMB-62 entered the harbour she collided with CMB-79, causing her to sink. CMB-62 slowed down to pick up the survivors. CMB-24 launched a torpedo, and was destroyed by return fire; her torpedo missed its nominated target, Gavriil. Napier on CMB-62 saw this and launched his two torpedoes at Gavriil but these also missed. CMB-62 was also struck by fire from Gavriil and sank just outside the harbour. Her crew were rescued by the Bolsheviks and taken prisoner.

The distraction caused by the first wave allowed CMB-31 and CMB-88 to escape to open sea, covered by Agar in CMB-4, who launched his torpedo into the harbour entrance to deter any pursuit. The action was over by 2.00 am. During the return to base CMB-86 was found and successfully towed back to Bjorko.

== Impact ==
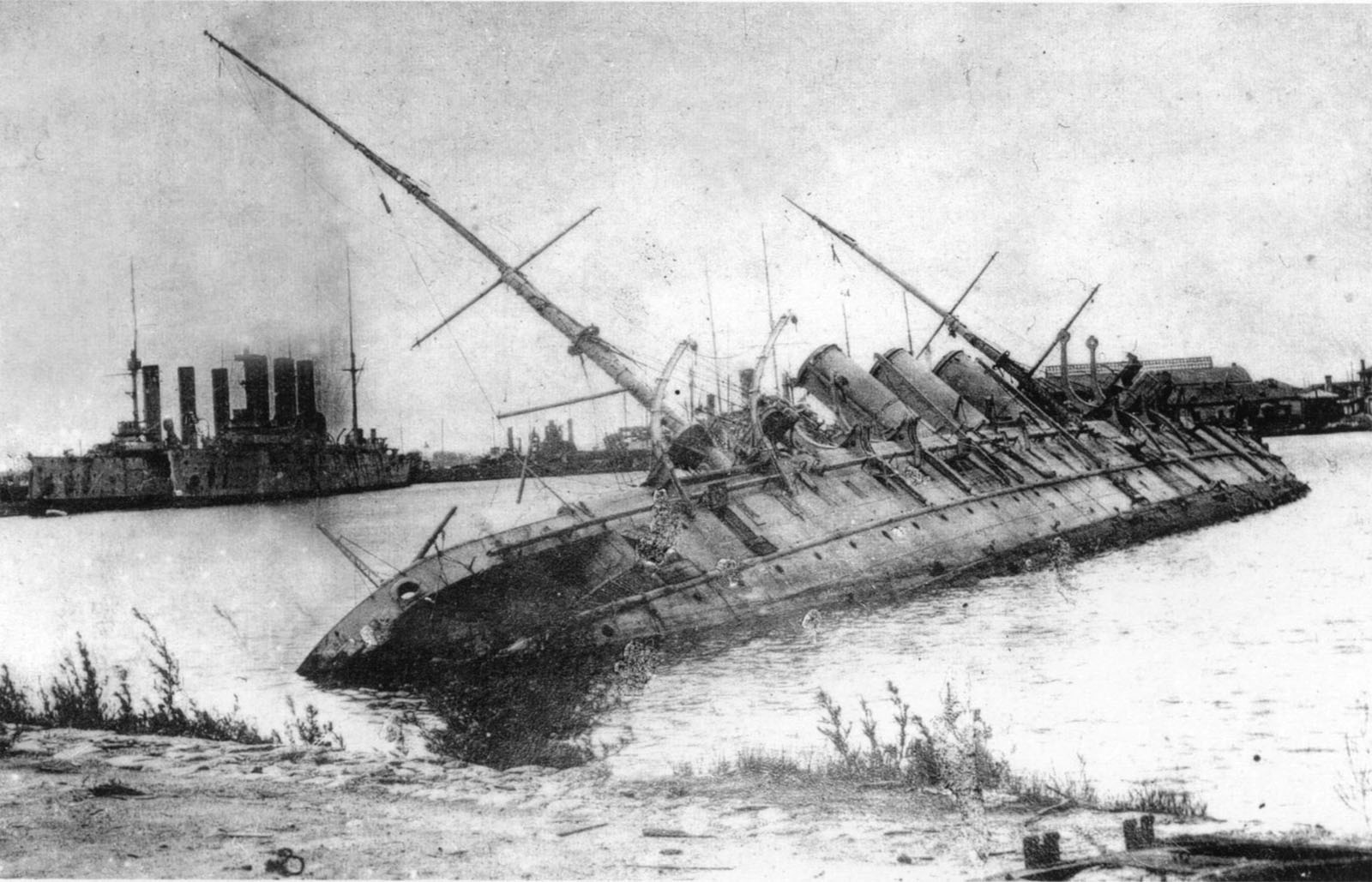
Wreckage of the Pamiat Azova

The action saw three CMBs sunk and two damaged with only CMB-31 unharmed. Between seven and ten men were killed in the action (the Commonwealth War Graves Commission lists eight Royal Navy dead: three each from CMB-79 and CMB-62, plus Brade and Dayrell-Reed). Dayrell-Reed's body remained on board CMB-88 and he was buried at Koivisto. One man later died of wounds sustained on the raid and nine were taken prisoner. Of the 55 British participants 48 were awarded a gallantry medal or mentioned in despatches. This included two Victoria Crosses (to Steele and Dobson), six Distinguished Service Orders, eight Distinguished Service Medals and three posthumous mentions in despatches to Royal Navy personnel and six Distinguished Flying Crosses, a bar to the same medal and six mentions in despatches to RAF personnel. Dobson rose to eventually become a rear admiral, he donated a safety pin from one of the torpedoes fired from CMB-31 to the collection of the Imperial War Museum.

On the Bolshevik side the Pamiat Azova was sunk and never returned to service. The Andrei Pervozvanny suffered critical damage and remained out of action for the rest of the Baltic campaign. A destroyer was also damaged by the RAF aircraft. The dry dock, which had been assigned as Brade's original target, escaped damage.

The raid became known by the British military as the "Scooter Raid". Although the damage inflicted was relatively light the raid demoralised the Bolshevik naval command; the Baltic Fleet, with the exception of its submarines, scarcely left the harbour for the rest of the campaign and the action effectively ended any threat to the Allied forces from a fleet action. Cowan said "after this, nothing bigger than destroyer moved again". Though the submarines continued to operate they had lost much of their spare equipment and torpedoes in the wreck of the Pamiat Azova. The raid served to galvanise the sailors of the Baltic Fleet in their support of the Bolsheviks, as it united disparate factions against a foreign enemy.

== Later actions ==
After the raid Cowan continued to blockade Kronstadt and laid minefields on its approaches and Agar continued to run agents into the area. On 31 August the British destroyer Vittoria was sunk by the Bolshevik submarine Pantera. This was the last engagement between Bolshevik and Allied vessels in the Baltic, though losses of vessels of both sides to mines and British air raids on Kronstadt continued. An attempt in late October to bombard Krasnaya Gorka by a monitor, Erebus, failed due to lack of ammunition and the loss of her spotting aircraft.

In November Cowan's ships drove back attacks on Riga and Libau (modern-day Liepāja) by the German-supported West Russian Volunteer Army. By this point the Bolsheviks had grown weary of war and peace talks began, these led to an armistice. The Treaty of Tartu saw Russian recognition of the independence of Estonia on 2 February 1920, the Soviet–Lithuanian Peace Treaty accomplished the same for Lithuania on 12 July and the Latvian–Soviet Peace Treaty for Latvia on 11 August.
