= Coastal motor boat =

Torpedo boats built by Britain in World War I

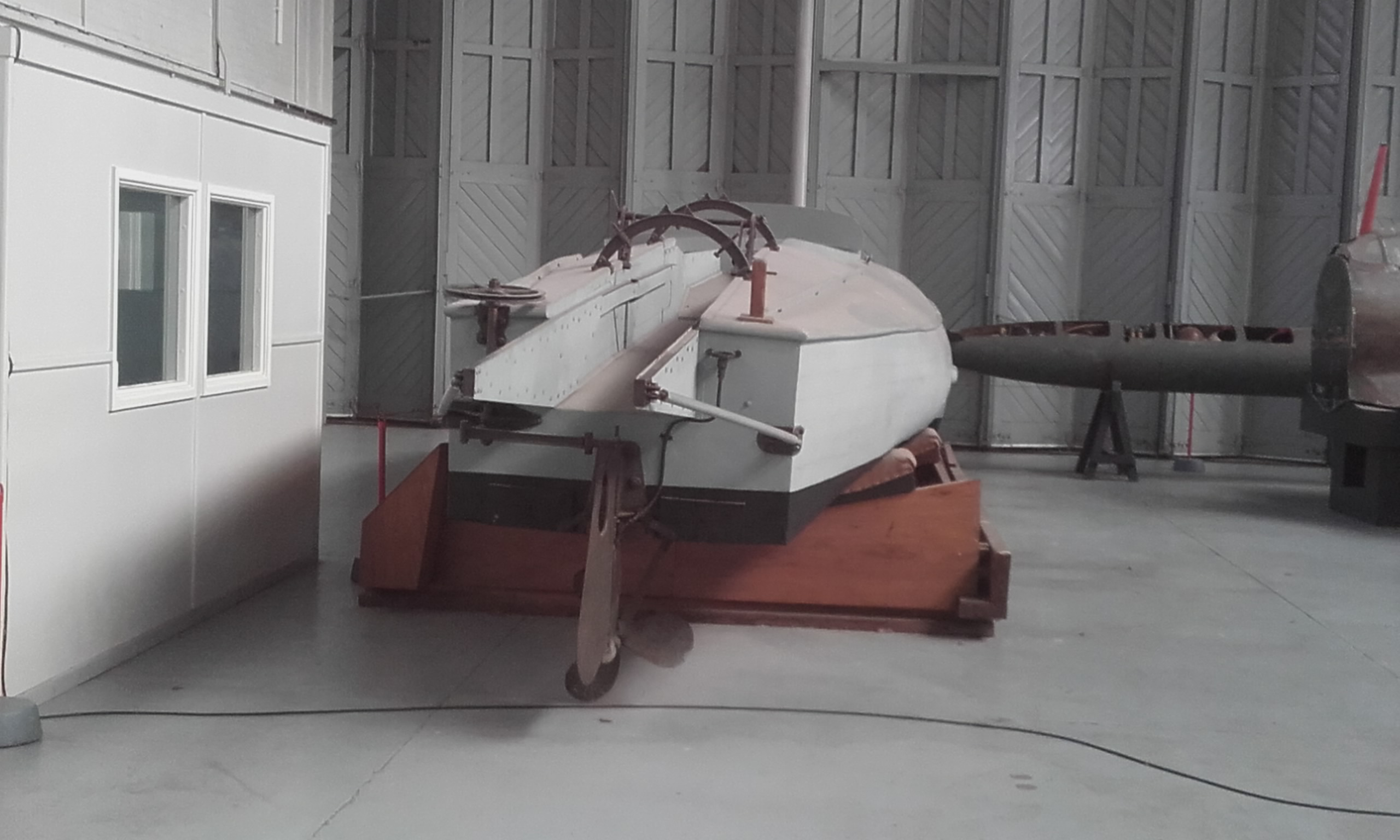
40-foot HM Coastal Motor Boat 4 (1916) on display at the Imperial War Museum Duxford, 2017; view from the stern showing the torpedo launching ramp

Coastal Motor Boat was a small high-speed British motor torpedo boat used by the Royal Navy in the First World War and up to end of the Second World War.

During the First World War, following a suggestion from three junior officers of the Harwich Striking Force that small motor boats carrying a torpedo might be capable of travelling over the protective minefields and attacking ships of the Imperial German Navy at anchor in their bases, the Admiralty gave tentative approval to the idea and, in the summer of 1915, produced a Staff Requirement requesting designs for a Coastal Motor Boat for service in the North Sea.

These boats were expected to have a high speed, making use of the lightweight and powerful petrol engines then available. The speed of the boat when fully loaded was to be at least 30 knots (56 km/h; 35 mph) and sufficient fuel was to be carried to give a considerable radius of action.

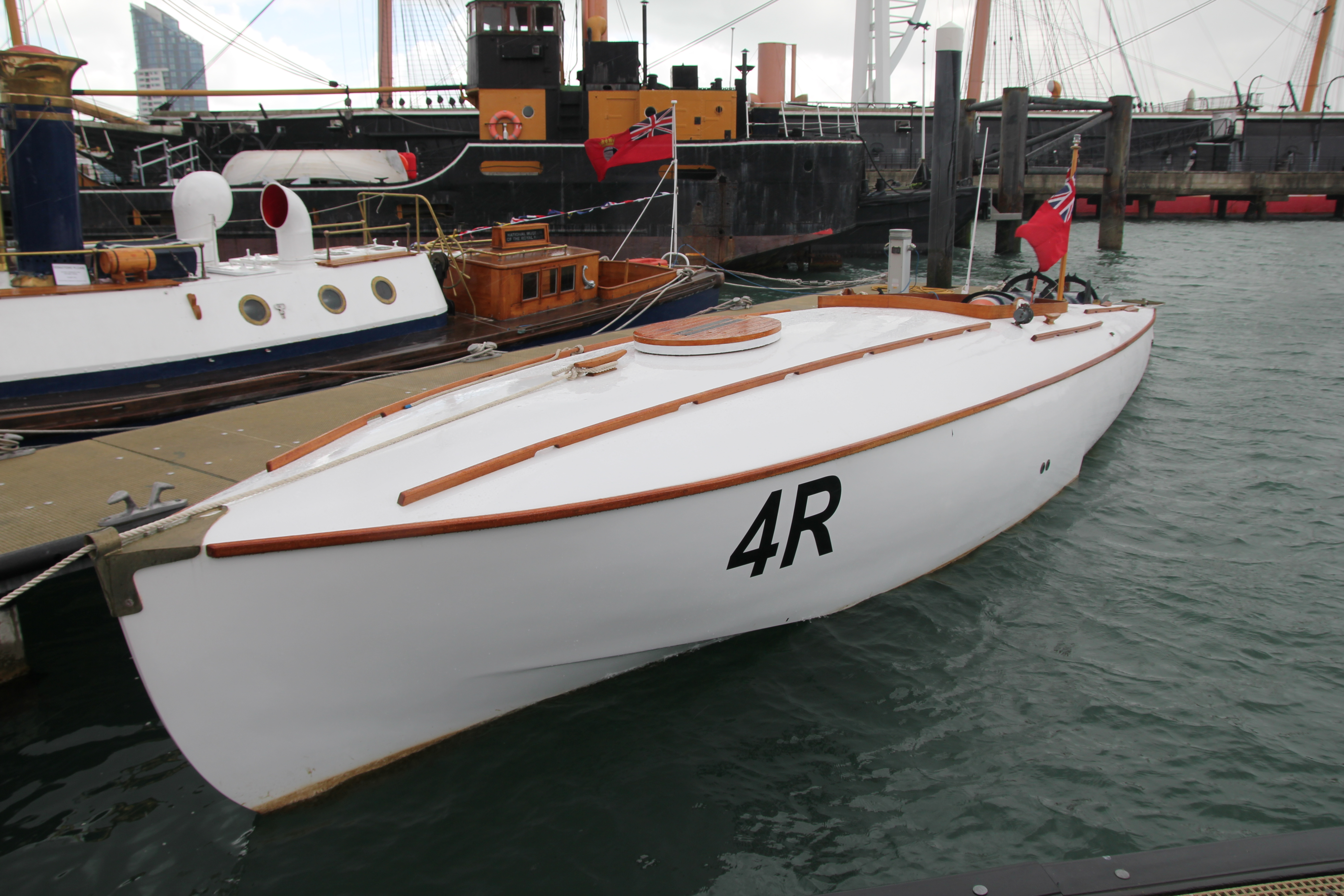
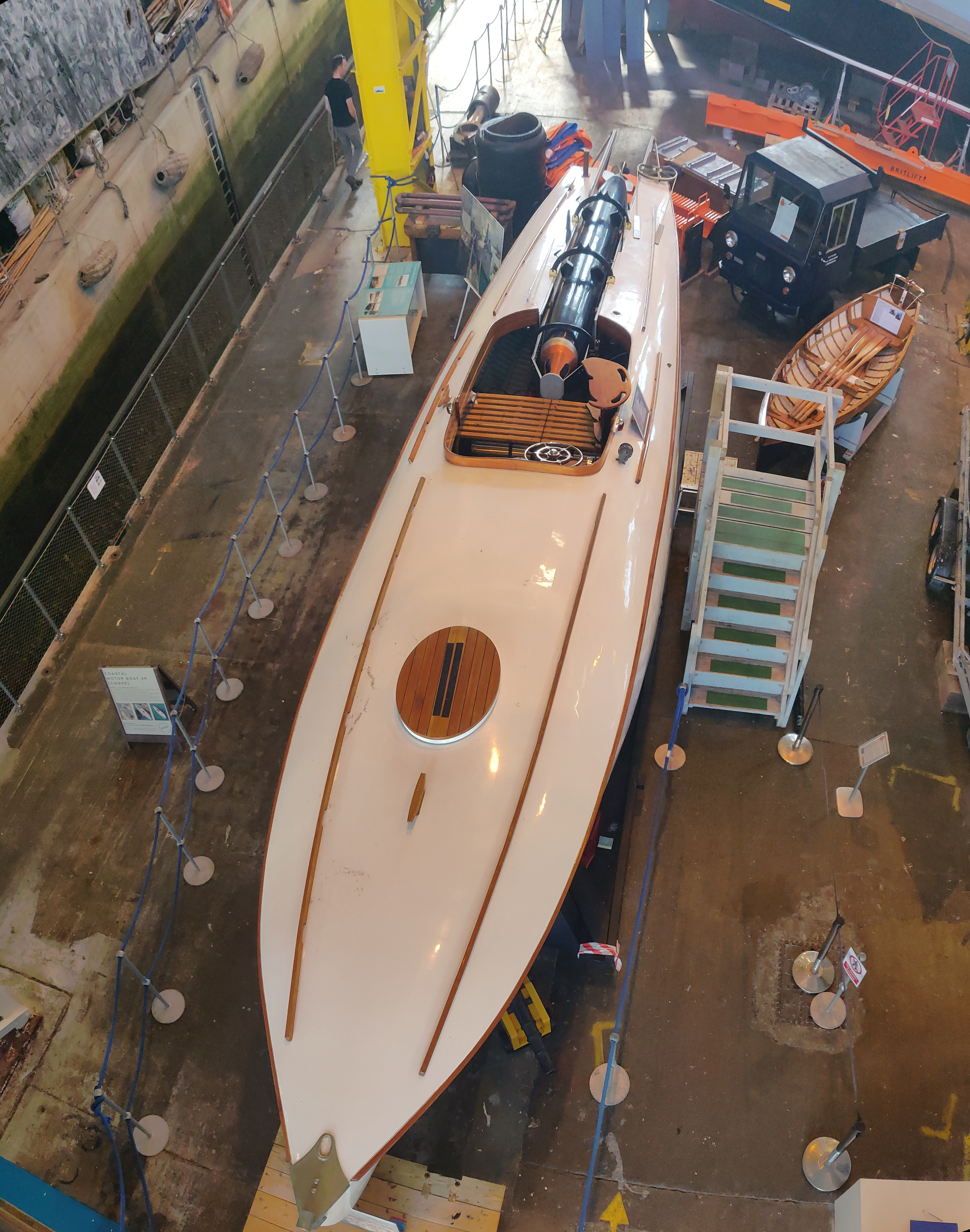
CMB 4R (2024), a replica of 40-foot HM Coastal Motor Boat 4, 2025

They were to be armed in a variety of ways, with torpedoes, depth charges or for laying mines. Secondary armament would have been provided by light machine guns, such as the Lewis gun. The weight of a fully loaded boat, complete with a 18-inch (450 mm) torpedo, (Note: British "18-inch" torpedoes were 17.72 in (45.0 cm) in diameter.) was to not exceed the weight of the 30-foot (9.1 m) long motor boat then carried in the davits of a light cruiser, i.e. 4.5 long tons (5.0 short tons; 4.6 t).

The CMBs were designed by Thornycroft, who had experience in small fast boats, though nearly half were built by eight other boat builders under subcontract. The boat builders were Tom Bunn of Rotherhithe, Taylor & Bates of Chertsey, Camper & Nicholson of Gosport, Wills & Packham of Sittingbourne, Salter Brothers of Oxford, Rowhedge Iron Works of Rowhedge, Frank Maynard of Chiswick, J. W. Brooks of Lowestoft. Engines were not proper maritime internal combustion engines (as these were in short supply) but adapted aircraft engines from firms such as Sunbeam and Napier.

== 40-foot Coastal Motor Boats ==
Class overview
- Name: 40-foot CMB
- Builders: Thornycroft, Tom Bunn, Taylor & Bates, Camper and Nicholsons, J W Brooke, Frank Maynard, Salter Bros, Wills & Packham
- Operators: Royal Navy
- Completed: 39 + 2 not taken into service as CMB
- Canceled: 16
- Preserved: 1 (CMB 4)

General characteristics
- Displacement: 5 long tons (5.6 short tons; 5.1 t)
- Length: 45 ft (14 m) o/a
- Propulsion: One shaft; various choices of petrol engine
- Complement: 2–3
- Armament: 1 × 18 in (450 mm) torpedo; 2–4 × Lewis guns; Depth charges or mines
- Notes: Mahogany plank on frame construction; single-step planing round-form hull

In 1910, Thornycroft had designed and built a 25 ft (7.6 m) speedboat called Miranda IV. She was a single-step hydroplane powered by a 120 hp (89 kW) Thornycroft petrol engine and could reach 35 knots (65 km/h; 40 mph).

A 40 ft (12 m) boat based on Miranda IV was accepted by the Admiralty for trials. A number of these boats were built and had a distinguished service history, but in hindsight they were considered to be too small to be ideal, particularly in how their payload was limited to a single 18-inch torpedo.

Several companies were approached, but only Thornycroft considered it possible to meet such a requirement. In January 1916, twelve boats were ordered, all of which were completed by August 1916. Further boats were built, to a total of 39.

The restriction on weight meant the torpedo could not be fired from a torpedo tube, but instead was carried in a rear-facing trough. On firing it was pushed backwards by a cordite firing pistol and a long steel ram, entering the water tail-first. A trip-wire between the torpedo and the ram head would start the torpedo motors once pulled taut during release. The CMB would then turn hard over and get out of its path. There is no record of a CMB ever being hit by its own torpedo, but in one instance the firing pistol was triggered prematurely and the crew had a tense 20 minutes close to the enemy whilst reloading it.

== 55-foot Coastal Motor Boats ==
Class overview
- Name: 55-foot CMB
- Operators: Royal Navy
- Completed: 88

General characteristics
- Displacement: 11 long tons (12.3 short tons; 11.2 t)
- Length: 60 ft (18 m) o/a
- Beam: 11 ft (3.4 m)
- Draught: 3 ft (0.91 m)
- Propulsion: 750–900 hp (560–670 kW) total power depending on engines; Two shafts
- Speed: 34–42 knots (63–78 km/h; 39–48 mph)
- Crew: 3–5
- Armament: 2 × 18 in (450 mm) torpedoes or 1 × 18-inch torpedo plus four depth charges; 4 × Lewis guns

Larger versions of the 40-footer were ordered in 1916.

In 1917, John I. Thornycroft & Company produced an enlarged 60-foot (18 m) overall version. This allowed a heavier payload, and now two torpedoes could be carried. A mixed warload of a single torpedo and four depth charges could also be carried, the depth charges released from individual cradles over the sides, rather than a stern ramp.

Speeds from 35–41 knots (65–76 km/h; 40–47 mph) were possible, depending on the various petrol engines fitted. At least two unexplained losses due to fires in port are thought to have been caused by a build-up of petrol vapour igniting.

History

United Kingdom
- Name: MTB 331
- Builder: Thornycroft
- Launched: 1941

Class overview
- Name: 55-foot CMBT (1941 class)
- Operators: Royal Navy
- Completed: 14
- Preserved: 1 (MTB 331)

General characteristics
- Displacement: 17 long tons (19.0 short tons; 17.3 t)
- Length: 60 ft (18 m)
- Beam: 11 ft 6 in (3.5 m)
- Draught: 4 ft (1.2 m)
- Propulsion: 2 × 650 hp (480 kW) Thornycroft RY12 petrol engines; Two shafts
- Speed: 40 knots (74 km/h; 46 mph)
- Armament: 2 × 18 in (450 mm) torpedoes; Depth charges or mines
- Notes: Mahogany plank on frame construction; single-step planing round-form hull

The design was so successful that more were built during World War II. The last survivor, MTB 331, is of this group, built in 1941.

== 70-foot Coastal Motor Boats ==
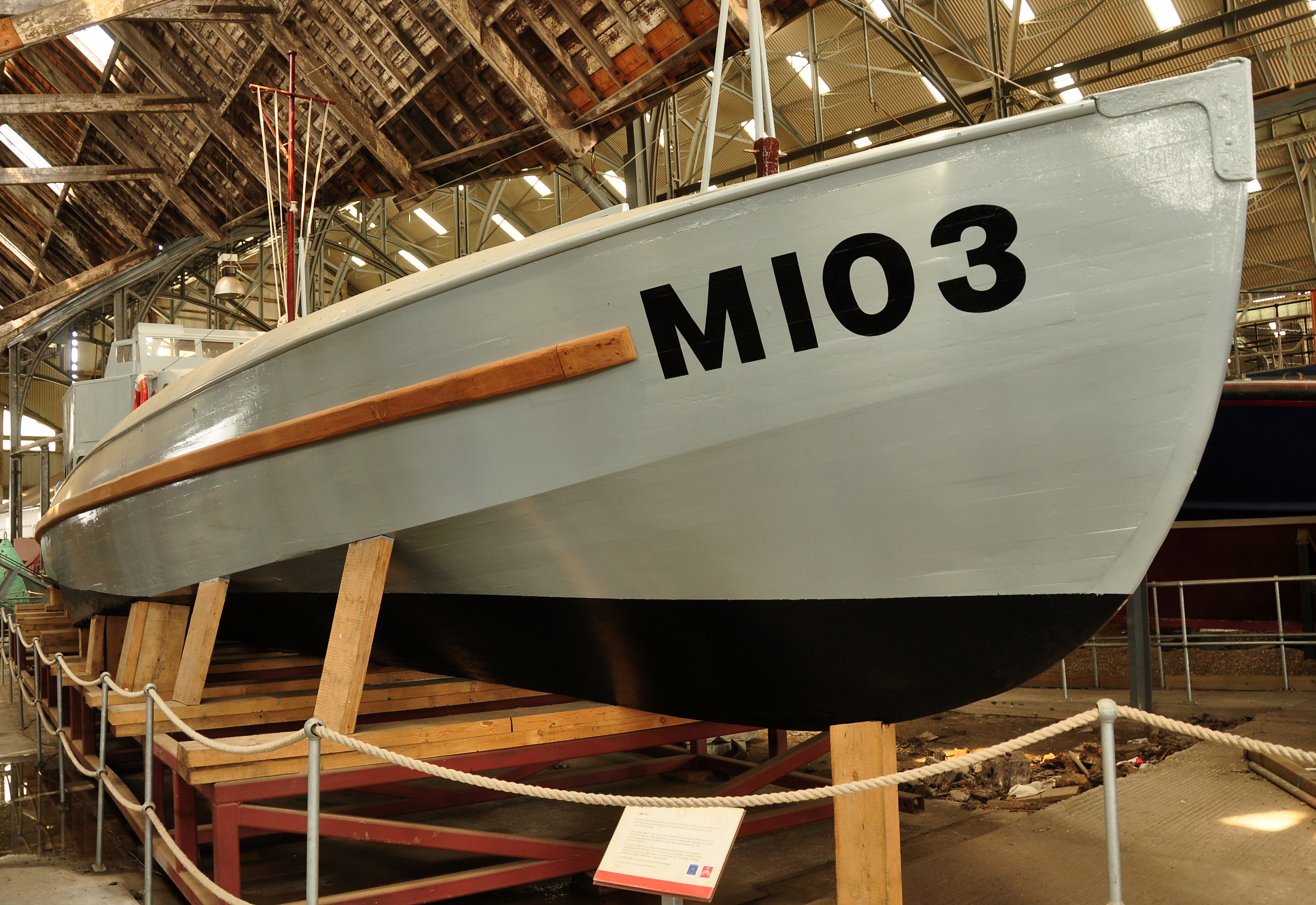
CMB 103 at Chatham, 2012

Twelve 72 ft long CMBs were ordered in early 1918 for minelaying (7 magnetic mines) or torpedo work (6 torpedoes). Five were cancelled; of the remainder, 3 survived the Second World War, with CMB 103 MT, built by Camper and Nicholsons in 1920, preserved as a museum ship. She was restored in August 2011 and is on display at The Historic Dockyard Chatham.

== Service history ==
In December 1916, the 3rd Coastal Motor Boat Division proceeded to Dunkirk under the command of Lieutenant W. N. T. Beckett commanding HM Coastal Motor Boat 4 and operated on the Belgian coast. On 7 April 1917, the 3rd CMB Division attacked a group of German destroyers anchored at Zeebrugge. As a result, one destroyer was sunk and one very seriously damaged. For these actions Beckett was mentioned in Despatches and was awarded the Distinguished Service Cross (DSC).

During the Zeebrugge Raid on 23 April 1918 to block the port, Coastal Motor Boats and Motor Launches were fitted out to deploy a smoke screen.

Sixteen Coastal Motor Boats were lost during the war.

In 1919 the British operated against Soviet Red forces in the Baltic. Coastal Motor Boats were initially used for secret duties to move agents in and out of Soviet Russia from a base in Finland. But in June 1919, the commander of the force, Lieutenant Augustus Agar, took two CMBs in a raid on Bolsheviks' ships in Kronstadt. Agar, in Coastal Motor Boat 4, entered the harbour and sank the cruiser Oleg. Agar was awarded the Victoria Cross for his part in this operation.

In August, a larger operation supported with aircraft managed to damage one battleship and sink a depot ship. There were casualties as the mission came under heavy fire. For piloting the boats there Lt. Agar was awarded a Distinguished Service Order to accompany his Victoria Cross. Gordon Charles Steele (Coastal Motor Boat 88) and Claude Congreve Dobson (Flotilla commander in the 55 ft Coastal Motor Boat 31) received Victoria Crosses. Russell Hamilton McBean (commander of CMB 31), Edward Bodley (CMB 72) and Francis Yates received DSOs.

In January 1919 a force of 12 CMBs was dispatched to the Caspian Sea (travelling by rail from Batumi on the Black Sea coast to Baku) to join a British naval unit supporting the anti-Bolshevik governments of the Republic of Armenia, Azerbaijan Democratic Republic and the Democratic Republic of Georgia.

== Survivors ==
The hull of CMB 4 in which Augustus Agar won his VC for the attack on Kronstadt naval base in 1919 and sank the cruiser Oleg was, for many years, at the Vosper Thornycroft works on Platt's Eyot on the Thames near Kingston. When these works closed it was restored and can now be seen in Boathouse 4 at Portsmouth Historic Dockyard where it is on loan from the Imperial War Museum Duxford with details of these boats and the action. Agar's VC is at the Imperial War Museum in London.

The hull of the other remaining example, CMB 9, is identical to that of CMB 4, for many years thought to be the sole survivor of the type. Her crew consisted of Archibald Dayrell Reed and Lieutenant Harold Drew. CMB 9 was converted to a Distance Control Boat in 1917, the first CMB so converted and in so doing became DCB 1. The DCB role was and still is in part classified, completely autonomous, unmanned and radio controlled via aircraft, therefore can considered to be the first autonomous drone vessel. Following the success of the Royal Flying Corps drone 'Aerial Target' aircraft trials in March 1917, A. M. Low's Experimental Works at Feltham adapted their radio control system, enabling two DCB craft to be controlled from one aircraft and proving in the 1918 trials that a flotilla of up to eight DCBs could be controlled in close formation. At the conclusion of extensive post war trials CMB 9 / DCB 1 was converted back to her original condition, remaining in service until 1950. She has been restored in her role as CMB 9 and is based at Avonmouth and took part in the 2014 Remembrance Day events in Bristol. The boat is listed on the register of National Historic Ships, certificate no 2430.

MTB 331, owned by Hampshire County Council and on-loan to the British Military Powerboat Trust (BMPT) at Marchwood, is the sole surviving 55-foot CMB. Built in 1941, the penultimate 55-foot built, her design was based on that of the CMBs of 1917 with two V12 engines. Her post-war history is incomplete, but she was registered as the Jonrey at Teignmouth, then later at Bristol. She was acquired by the Council around 1990. Some restoration after this was carried out at Priddy's Hard, then she was transported by road to BMPT Marchwood in March 2000.

== See also ==
- Coastal Forces of the Royal Navy
