= Alexander McBean =

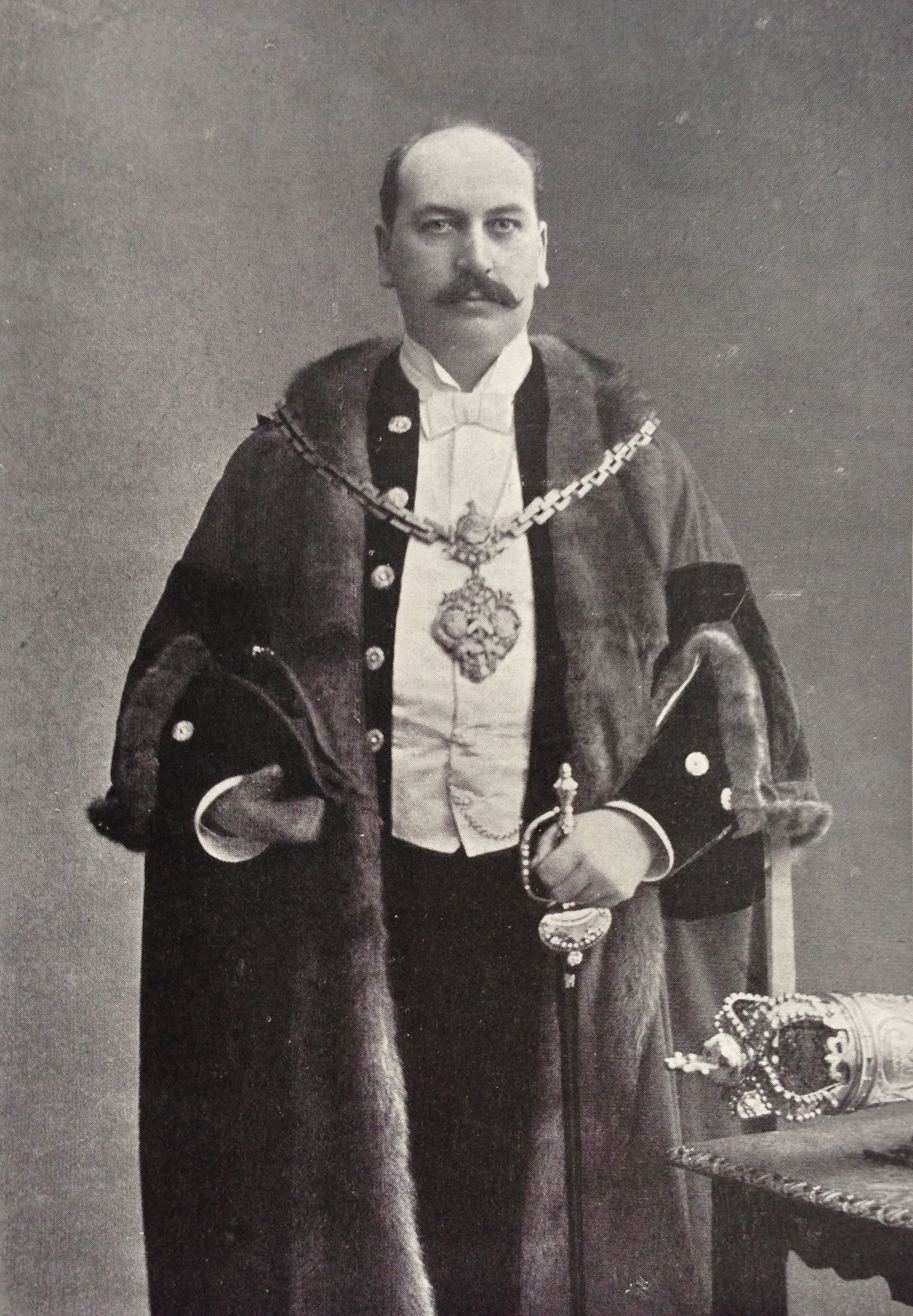
Colonel Alexander McBean VD, DL, JP., of Tyninghame, Tettenhall, Staffordshire. Photograph of him when Mayor of Wolverhampton 1897–1898.

Colonel Alexander McBean V.D., D.L., J.P., of Tyninghame, Tettenhall, Staffordshire (born: 12 Apr 1854, died: 16 Feb 1937) was a leading businessman, soldier, local Conservative politician, Freemason and Churchman in the Midlands.

== Background and education ==
He was the second son of Captain Thomas Hamilton McBean, Scots Greys and his wife Rosanna Taylor (born: Grange, Kildare), daughter of Reverend Thomas Taylor M.A. of Ballynure, County Wicklow and Kingston, Ontario, Canada. His mother's brother Thomas Dixon Taylor was the grandfather of Edward Plunkett Taylor, the creator of Canadian Breweries and well known race-horse owner who amongst other horses bred 'Nijinsky II' and 'Northern Dancer', the most successful sire of the 20th century.

Six months after Alexander's birth, his father took part in Charge of the Heavy Brigade during the battle of Balaclava in the Crimea. The family came from Haddingtonshire, to where a forebear had migrated from Inverness-shire after the battle of Culloden. Quite a few McBeans fought at Culloden, most famously Gillies McBean, Major in Lady Anne Mackintosh's (Clan Chattan) Regiment. His father was christened with the names of his godfather Thomas Hamilton, Lord Binning (9th Earl of Haddington from 1828), who was a brother-officer and friend of Thomas's father John McBean (Macbean), a Farmer from Tyninghame, East Lothian and then Brewer in Haddington. Thomas's mother Catherine was 1st cousin to Scottish artist William Yellowlees who was known as 'the Little Raeburn' to contemporaries and was cabinet portrait artist to the Duke of Sussex - their mothers were the sisters Catherine and Isabella Newton - the latter married John Yellowlees, the former married Alexander Matthew. Alexander Matthew and Catherine Newton's banns were recorded at Edinburgh's West Kirk (St Cuthbert's) on 1 February 1783, and marriage at Haddington 5 February 1783.

Alexander's father died whilst the Scots Greys were stationed at Birmingham, when Alexander was still young; the family remained in the Midlands rather than settle back at his father's home in Scotland. Alexander was sent to be educated privately in Edinburgh and later at King Edward's School, Birmingham.

== Business career ==
He originally intended to pursue an army career but needing to abandon the idea in order to help look after his family, he joined a leading firm of Iron Merchants, where he was taken into partnership. He soon founded his own business as an Iron and Steel Merchant—Alexander McBean & Son—and became one of the leading men in his trade and one of the best known men on the Birmingham Iron Exchange. He was prominently associated with iron & steel works in Staffordshire and other counties, and with collieries and coke production in South Wales. For many years he was a director of blast furnaces and mines in Northamptonshire, and he was well known in the iron districts, not only of the Midlands, but Scotland, the West Coast of England and, Cleveland, Sheffield and South Wales. He was President of the Wolverhampton Chamber of Commerce, 1895-96. His brother Thomas McBean of Hallow Park near Worcester was also involved in the Iron and Steel trade.

== Service to his community ==
Nominated as a Conservative Councillor for St. Mark's Ward in 1890 and became an active member of the Public Works, Water and Lighting Committees. After the division of the wards he became Councillor for Dunstall Ward. He became Mayor of Wolverhampton, 1897/8 and then an Alderman of the Borough. During his Mayoralty, he displayed special earnestness in his advocacy of better housing for the poor and created momentum for the achievement of this objective.

He was a staunch Conservative and Unionist, and was one of the party's leaders in Wolverhampton, becoming Vice-President of Wolverhampton Conservative Association.

He served as a Justice of the Peace from 1896, was appointed as Chief Magistrate for the Borough of Wolverhampton in 1898 and was appointed a County Magistrate in April 1903.

He was a well known Freemason and became Worshipful Master of two Masonic Lodges in Wolverhampton—the Lodge of Honour (initiated 9 March 1883—his younger brother Thomas McBean (later of Hallow Park, near Worcester) was initiated into the same lodge 12 June 1885) and the Tudor Lodge of Rifle Volunteers (initiated 1883); he was also a past officer of the Provincial Grand Lodge of Staffordshire and a past member of the Chapter and Mark Lodges.

McBean was a thorough Churchman and served as a lay representative at Diocesan Conferences.

He was an honorary member of several Friendly Societies and his name was found on a closed-up honours board in the front bar of the Stile Inn, Whitmore Reans, along with the names of several dozen Wolverhampton worthies from the late Victorian period to just after the First World War, all of whom were 'Honorary Members' of Lodge 626 of a Friendly Society.

He maintained a strong interest in his Scottish heritage and was President of the local Burns' Club 1895-96.

McBean Road in Whitmore Reans is named after him and Tyninghame Avenue and Lothians Road in Tettenhall are named after his house there and the place in Scotland his family was connected to i.e. Tyninghame, East Lothian.

== Military appointments ==
Alexander continued his family's military traditions by joining the local regiment and became Lieutenant Colonel Commandant and Honorary Colonel of the 3rd Battalion, South Staffordshire Regiment in 1903, 1901–1906. He served on the District Command of the National Reserve, South Staffordshire, 1911–1914 and was on the War office Committee framing regulations for National Reserve; he helped raise new Battalions in 1914 and was later in command of Districts and Depots. He served as Lt. Colonel of 6th Battalion South Staffordshire Regiment 1915–1917. He took active interest before and during South African Campaign period and after, and in the Great War in all associations for sailors and soldiers and their families and also for Royal Patriotic Fund. It was a result of the movement he set up with his wife during the South African war, which included efforts to find employment or ex-soldiers in pre-Labour Exchange days, that he became known as 'the Soldiers' Friend'.

He was appointed as a Deputy Lieutenant of Staffordshire on 20 April 1933.

== Family ==
He married Eliza ('Lesa') Ward Amatt on 31 October 1876 at Birchfield, Staffordshire, daughter of Henry ('Harry') Alfred Amatt and Mary Ann Ward. Harry Amatt had a first cousin John Harley Amatt whose mother Mary Harley was daughter of John Harley one of the Harleys of Osgathorpe. John Harley Amatt had a son also called Henry, who died 2 July 1861. When Alexander was recorded as owning 118 acres of land in Staffordshire in 1873, his address was noted as 'Harley'. It is not known if this name of his property was coincidental or indicated an ongoing Harley connection, nor if the address and land is synonymous with the place he later built a new home he named 'Tyninghame'. Part of the lands he originally owned in Tettenhall were used to build South Staffordshire Golf Course.

They had two sons, Captain Alexander Hamilton McBean, Queen's Own Cameron Highlanders and Archibald Darby-Griffith McBean, and four daughters. The elder son, Alexander was his father's heir. Having initially joined the volunteer battalion of the South Staffordshire regiment, he joined the 4th Battalion, Cameron Highlanders after the outbreak of the 1st World War, and commanded the battalion at Etaples in 1916. He then served in the 1st Battalion and finally the 5th Battalion. He was gassed twice, once severely, wounded twice, once very severely. He was mentioned in dispatches and awarded the Belgian Croix de Guerre. Alexander Hamilton McBean had the honour of commanding the 9th (Scottish) Division contingent from the Army of Occupation at Cologne at the great Victory Parade in Paris, on Bastille Day 14 July 1919. One month later, his 1st cousin Captain Russell Hamilton McBean won a DSO for his part in the daring raid on Kronstadt, the Baltic base of the Bolshevik fleet.

Archibald gained his middle name from General Henry Darby-Griffith (son of Major-General Matthew Darby-Griffith), who was his grandfather Thomas Hamilton McBean's Colonel, had commanded the Scots Greys in the Crimea and led them (including Thomas) at the successful Charge of the Heavy Brigade during the Battle of Balaclava. Both he and his brother died unmarried and without children, Archibald on 23 September 1945, and Alexander Hamilton on 30 December 1950.

Their sister Esmé Lesa McBean married another well-known figure from Staffordshire, Colonel William John Beddows MC, TD, DL JP; they lived at Ardgowan, a home adjoining Tyninghame in Tettenhall, and then Ackleton House near Bridgnorth, Shropshire.

Colonel McBean had three other daughters. Margaret Isobel McBean married Henry Murdoch. Muriel Helen McBean married Guy Louis Martin, who served as an Officer in the French army during the First World War; they lived at St. Malo, Brittany. Hilda Beatrice McBean, the youngest daughter, married George Reginald Barnett-Smith who served in A Battery, Honourable Artillery Company during the South African War and, after being commissioned like many other HAC soldiers, as a Captain in the Sherwood Foresters during the First World War.
