= CMB4 =

CMB4 may refer to:

- HM Coastal Motor Boat 4, a British torpedo boat notable for a VC operation against Soviet ships.
- Lake Rosseau/Morgan Bay Water Aerodrome, a Canadian aerodrome for water based planes.
