= Claude Congreve Dobson =

English recipient of the Victoria Cross

Rear-Admiral Claude Congreve Dobson VC DSO
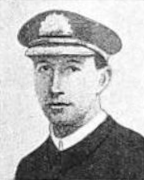
- Born: 1 January 1885; Clifton, Bristol, England
- Died: 26 June 1940 (aged 55); Chatham, Kent, England
- Burial place: Woodlands Cemetery, Gillingham
- Military career
- Allegiance: United Kingdom
- Branch: Royal Navy
- Service years: 1899–1935
- Rank: Rear-Admiral
- Commands: CMB 31BD
- Conflicts: World War I Russian Civil War
- Awards: Victoria Cross; Distinguished Service Order

Rear-Admiral Claude Congreve Dobson, VC, DSO (1 January 1885 – 26 June 1940) was an English recipient of the Victoria Cross, the highest and most prestigious award for gallantry in the face of the enemy that can be awarded to British and Commonwealth forces.

== Biography ==
Dobson was born in Clifton, Bristol, and was educated at Clifton College. He was an experienced submariner and small motor boat captain who served in World War I. He was 34 years old, and a commander in the Royal Navy serving with the North Russia Relief Force when the following deed took place for which he was awarded the VC:

On 18 August 1919 at Kronstadt, Russia, Commander Dobson was in command of the Coastal Motor Boat Flotilla which he led through the chain of forts to the entrance to Kronstadt harbour. CMB 31BD, a 55 ft boat, from which he directed the general operations then passed in under heavy machine-gun fire and hit the battleship Andrei Pervozvanny with both torpedoes, subsequently returning through heavy fire to the open sea. CMB 31BD was commanded and helmed by Lieutenant Russell Hamilton McBean.

His VC is currently displayed at the National Maritime Museum in Greenwich.

== See also ==
- Gordon Charles Steele - awarded VC in same action
- Augustus Agar - took part in the operation, awarded VC for an early action in a CMB and precluded from the main operation because of his special work for the secret services.
- Russell Hamilton McBean - awarded DSO in same action
