= Russell Hamilton McBean =

Royal Navy officer (1894–1963)

Captain Russell Hamilton McBean DSO DSC
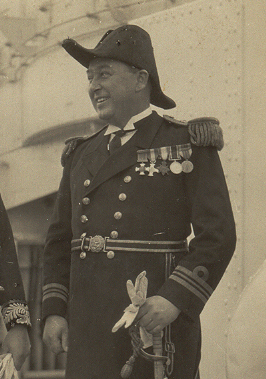
- McBean, when serving as Lieutenant-Commander, Royal Navy
- Born: 1894; England
- Died: 30 September 1963 (aged 68–69); Nyeri, Kenya
- Burial place: St. Peter's Cemetery, Nyeri, Kenya
- Relatives: Alexander McBean
- Military career
- Branch: Royal Navy
- Rank: Captain (Royal Navy)
- Conflicts: World War I Russian Civil War
- Awards: Distinguished Service Order Distinguished Service Cross

Captain Russell Hamilton McBean DSO DSC (3 March 1894 – 30 September 1963) was an officer in the Royal Navy and was one of the men who took part in the Raid on Kronstadt in August 1919.

McBean was born in 1894, the son of Lieutenant-Commander Thomas McBean RNVR, and his wife Jessie Mouat Russell of Hallow Park, Hallow, Worcestershire, and nephew of Colonel Alexander McBean. He joined the Royal Navy and served in both World Wars. He entered Osborne as a cadet in January 1907. He was a sub-lieutenant of the destroyers HMS Racehorse and HMS Lookout during the first part of the First World War During the First World War he was at Jutland and then became the second young officer to volunteer for service in Coastal Motor Boats (May 1916), and was with the force that led the attack on Zeebrugge and Ostend. At the second Ostend Raid during the night of 9/10 May 1918, Lieutenant McBean commanded and helmed CMB No.25, which escorted HMS Vindictive up to the entrance, torpedoed the western and eastern piers and engaged with enemy machine guns at point blank range. McBean was wounded and Acting-Chief Motor Mechanic Keel was killed. Three officers received the Victoria Cross, seven officers received the Distinguished Service Order, three received bars to their DSOs and Russell McBean was one of nine who received the Distinguished Service Cross. Many others also received decorations for gallantry. His citation reads:

"Lieut. Russell H. McBean, R.N. In command of a coastal motor boat. He escorted "Vindictive" close up to the entrance at Ostend, covering her with smokescreen and then assisting her with guiding lights. He torpedoed the eastern and western piers, and finally engaged the machine guns there with his own machine guns at pointblank range with apparently good effect. He most skilfully handled his vessel under a. heavy fire until he was wounded."

The Coastal Motor Boats were used again, successfully, for the Raid on Kronstadt on 18 August 1919. Lieutenant McBean commanded and helmed Coastal Motor Boat (CMB) 31 BD, with the commander of the Flotilla aboard, Commander Claude Dobson. McBean was known to be the best helmsman in the flotilla. CMB 31 led the raid through the chain of forts to the entrance to Kronstadt harbour. CMB 31BD, a 55 ft boat, from which Dobson directed the general operations then passed in under heavy machine-gun fire and hit the battleship Andrei Pervozvanny with both torpedoes, subsequently returning through heavy fire to the open sea. The entry in the London Gazette reads:

"Lieut. Russell Hamilton McBean, D.S.C., R.N. For distinguished services in command of H.M. Coastal Motor Boat No. 31 in the attack on Kronstadt Harbour on 18 August 1919. Under very heavy fire he entered the harbour, torpedoed the Bolshevik battleship "Andrei Pervozanni", and returned through the fire of the forts and batteries to the open sea."

Two safety pins in presentation cases, from torpedoes fired from McBean's CMBs during the Ostend and Kronstadt raids, were donated to the Imperial War Museum by a member of his family.

After the Great War, McBean was promoted to lieutenant-commander and held command of HMS Vindictive at Chatham, part of the Reserve Fleet. Since 1926 McBean commanded HMS Liffey and HMS Dee, fishery gunboats, and HMS Mantis, a river gunboat, in China, and the sloop HMS Chrysanthemum in the Mediterranean (1935–1936). From 1939 to 1945, McBean held a number of appointments in Europe and India. He is cited in 1941 as commanding officer of HMS Beehive (Motor Torpedo Patrol base / coastal forces base at Felixstowe), HMS Woolwich (1941), HMS Mosquito at Alexandria, Egypt (1942), executive officer of HMS Bull at Massawa, Eritrea (1942–44) and Assistant Director General of Ship Repairs at HMS Braganza, for duty at Calcutta (1945–1946). He retired for the last time as captain in the Royal Navy. After his retirement, he emigrated to live on his estate of Chattan Lodge, near Nyeri in Kenya. He was a keen fisherman and made good use of the many miles of trout stream which flowed through his land. He was a member of the Muthaiga Club.

== See also ==
- Gordon Charles Steele – awarded VC in same action
- Claude Congreve Dobson – awarded VC in same action
- Augustus Agar – took part in the operation, awarded VC for an early action in a CMB and precluded from the main operation because of his special work for the secret services.
