= Russian cruiser Pamiat Azova =

Armoured cruiser (1890–1909)

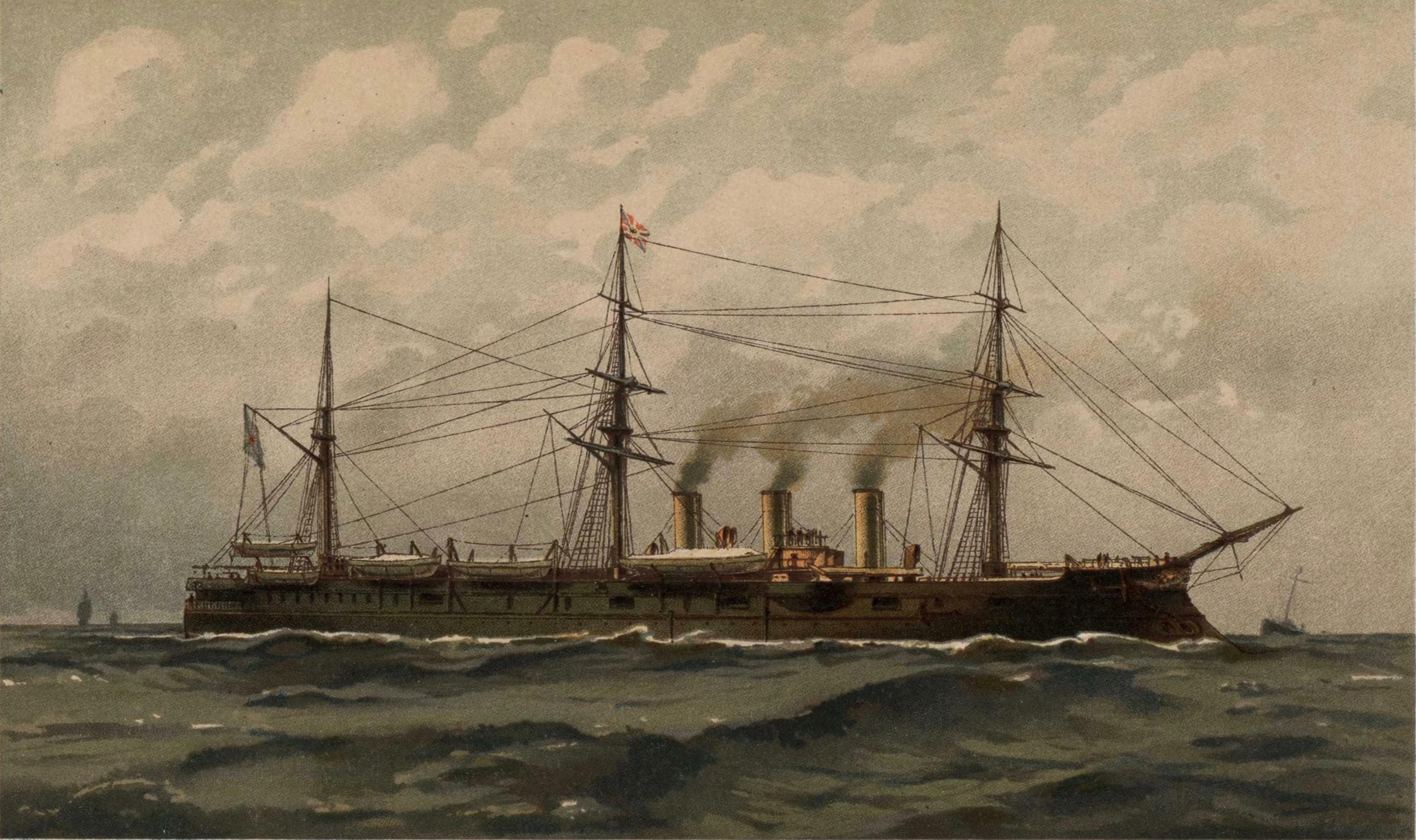
- 1892 lithograph

History

Russian Empire
- Name: Pamiat Azova
- Builder: Baltic Works, St. Petersburg, Russia
- Laid down: 1886
- Launched: 1 July 1888
- Commissioned: 1890
- Renamed: Dvina in 1909
- Reclassified: torpedo school ship, 1909
- Refit: 1904
- Fate: Sunk by British torpedo boats, 18 August 1919

General characteristics
- Type: Armoured cruiser
- Displacement: 6,674 t (6,569 long tons)
- Length: 384 ft 6 in (117.20 m)
- Beam: 56 ft 6 in (17.22 m)
- Draught: 26 ft 10 in (8.18 m)
- Propulsion: As built: Two shaft VTE steam engines; Six cylindrical boilers - 8,500 ihp (6,300 kW); Refitted: Two vertical triple expansion; 18 Bellville boilers - 5,664 ihp (4,224 kW)
- Speed: 17 knots (31 km/h)
- Complement: 640
- Armament: 2 × 8-inch (200 mm) guns; 13 × 6-inch (150 mm) guns; 7 × 47 mm guns; 8 × 37 mm guns; 3 × 15 in (380 mm) torpedo tubes
- Armour: Belt: 6–4 in (150–100 mm); Deck: 2.5 in (64 mm); Gun shields: 2 in (51 mm); Conning tower: 1.5 in (38 mm)

Pamiat Azova (Russian: Память Азовa) was a unique armoured cruiser built for the Imperial Russian Navy in the late 1880s. She was decommissioned from front line service in 1909, converted into a depot ship and sunk by British torpedo boats during the Baltic Naval War, part of the Russian Civil War.

== Name ==
The name of the ship commemorated the Russian ship of the line Azov, the flagship of the Russian squadron in the Battle of Navarino. The name of that ship, in its turn, referred to the Azov campaigns of Peter the Great. After the battle Nicholas I of Russia decreed that after the retirement of Azov the Imperial Navy must perpetually have a ship named Pamyat Azova (English: The Memory of Azov). The cruiser commissioned in 1890 was the third ship carrying this name.

== Design ==
The ship was designed as a commerce raider and rigged with sails to extend her range. She was built by Baltic Works in Saint Petersburg and launched on 1 July 1888. Her machinery was re-built in 1904 with Bellville boilers.

== Service ==
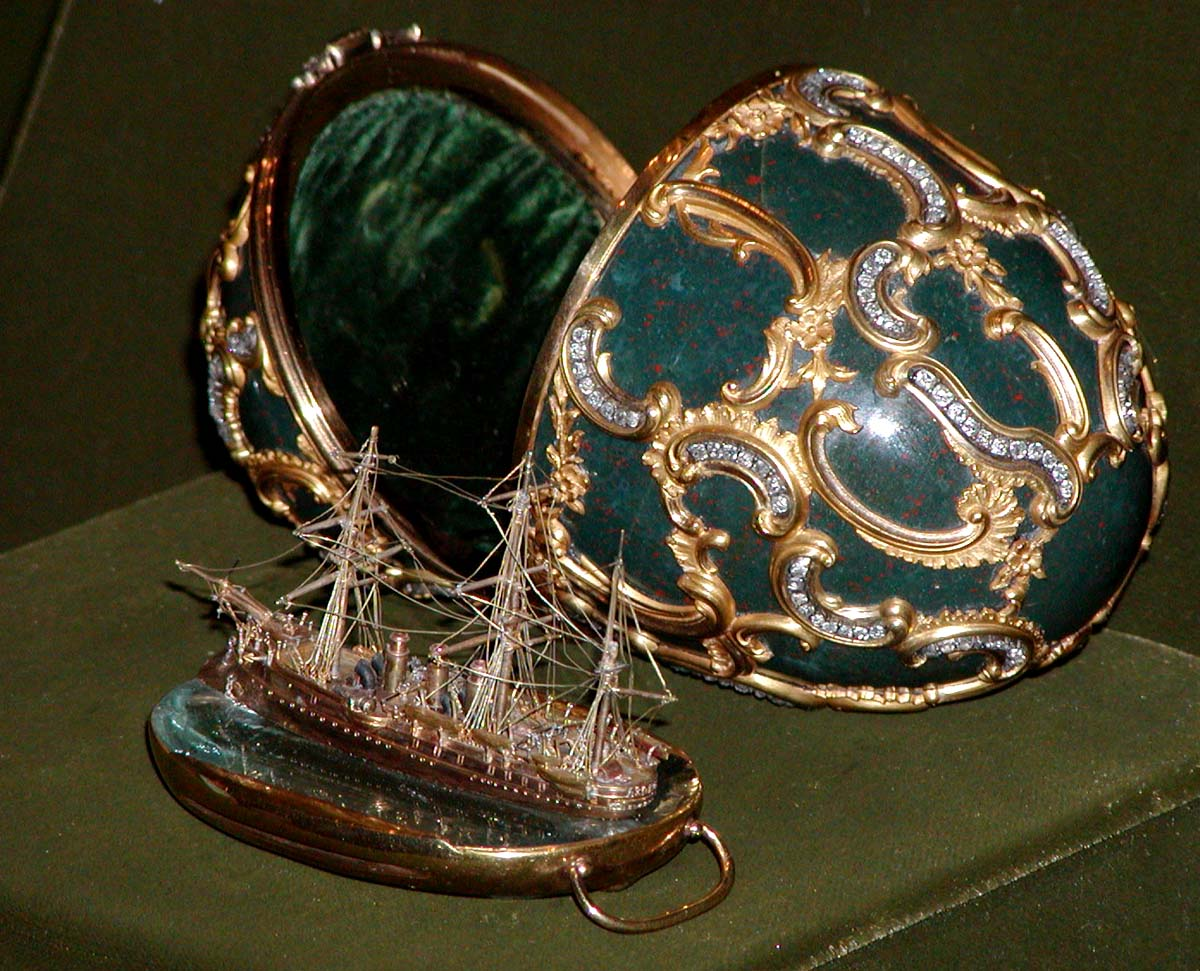
Pamiat Azova Egg

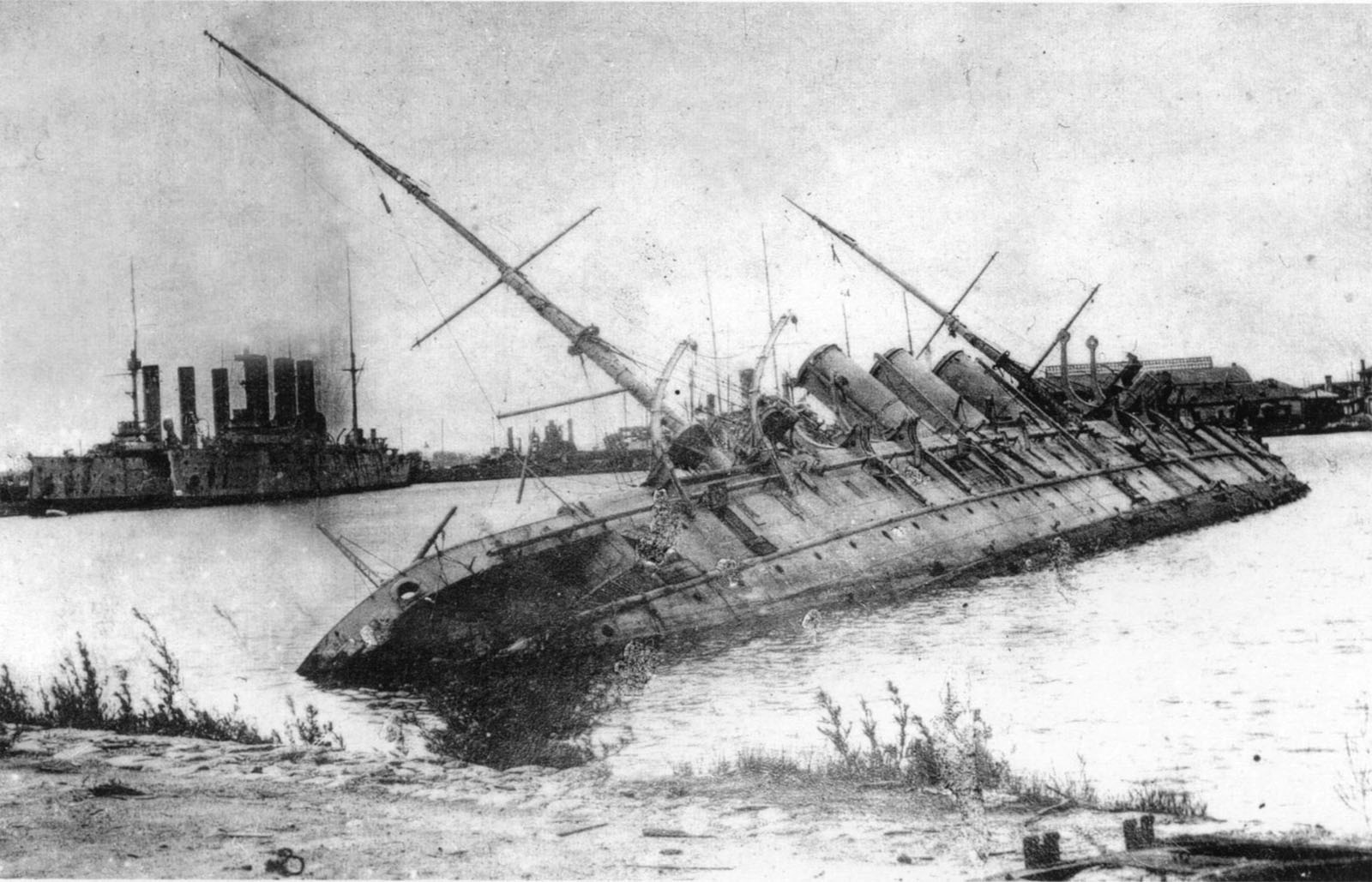
The wreck of Pamiat Azova in Kronstadt

The ship served with the Baltic Fleet, and in 1891–1892 it took part in a Cruise around Asia with Crown Prince Nicholas on board. This led to a Fabergé egg, the Memory of Azov being made to commemorate this event. She made a visit to the French Navy in October 1893 in Toulon to reinforce the Franco-Russian Alliance.

In 1906, during the First Russian Revolution, the crew of the cruiser mutinied while at Hara Bay near Reval. The ship subsequently was placed in reserve. In 1909 she was converted into a torpedo boat depot ship and renamed Dvina.

The ship was sunk by the British torpedo boat CMB79 in Kronstadt Harbour on 18 August 1919. The wreck was raised and scrapped.
