= William Yellowlees =

Scottish painter (1796–1855)

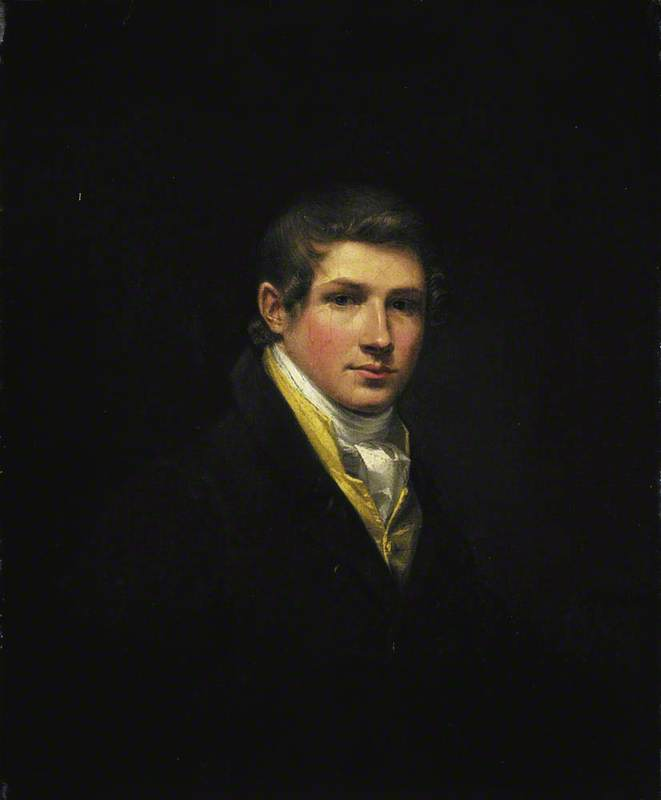
Self-portrait, 1816

William Yellowlees (1796 in Mellerstain – 1855 in London) was a Scottish painter. He came to Edinburgh in 1812, and studied there under William Shiels, the animal painter. He began practice as a portrait painter and soon became popular, winning the sobriquet of "the little Raeburn", partly by the small size, but more by the excellence of his work. He painted in Edinburgh for about fifteen years, and then moved to London, where he met with much success. Prince Albert was among his patrons. He contributed twenty portraits to the Royal Academy between 1829 and 1845. There is a portrait by him in the Scottish National Portrait Gallery. This self-portrait was identified by a descendant of William Yellowlees, Scottish psychiatrist and musician Alexander John Yellowlees, in the 1970s whilst attending medical school in Edinburgh.
