= Gordon Charles Steele =

English Royal Navy officer, VC recipient (1892–1981)

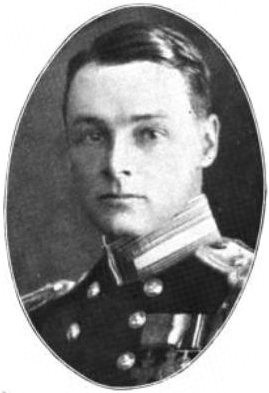
- Born: 1 November 1891; Exeter, Devon, England
- Died: 4 January 1981 (aged 89); Winkleigh, Devon, England
- Burial place: All Saint's New Cemetery, Winkleigh
- Military career
- Allegiance: United Kingdom
- Branch: Royal Navy
- Rank: Captain
- Conflicts: World War I Russian Civil War; World War II
- Awards: Victoria Cross

Captain Gordon Charles Steele VC (1 November 1891 – 4 January 1981) was an English Royal Navy captain and a recipient of the Victoria Cross, the highest and most prestigious award for gallantry in the face of the enemy that can be awarded to British and Commonwealth forces.

== Early life ==
On 1 November 1891, Steele was born in Exeter, Devon, England.

== Career ==
Steele was 27 years old, and a lieutenant in the Royal Navy serving with the North Russia Relief Force when the following deed took place for which he was awarded the VC.

On 18 August 1919 at Kronstadt, Russia, Lieutenant Steele was second-in-command of Coastal Motor Boat 88. Steele's boat became illuminated by an enemy searchlight. Very heavy machine gun fire followed immediately, the captain being killed and the boat thrown off course. A British aircraft saw the problem, dived on the searchlight and put it out with gunfire. Lieutenant Steele took the wheel and steadied the boat, lifting the dead officer away from the steering and firing position, and successfully torpedoed the battleship Andrei Pervozvanny at 100 yards range. He then manoeuvred the CMB in a very confined space to get a clear shot at the other battleship Petropavlovsk before making for the safety of the bay.

He was later promoted to the rank of captain and served in the Royal Navy during World War II. In 1940 he met, by chance and for the first time, the pilot of the aircraft (by now Group Captain Fletcher, RAF) who had attacked the searchlight.

He was the subject of This Is Your Life in 1958 when he was surprised by Eamonn Andrews at the BBC Television Theatre.

== Personal life ==
Steele's wife was May Mariette Steele. On 4 January 1981, Steele died in Winkleigh, Devon county, England. He was 89. On 28 October 1982, Steele's wife also died in Winkleigh. Both are buried at All Saint's New Cemetery in Winkleigh.

== See also ==
- Claude Congreve Dobson - won VC in same action
- Augustus Agar - won VC in same campaign in similar action
- Russell Hamilton McBean - awarded DSO in same action
