= HM Coastal Motor Boat 4 =

First World War torpedo boat

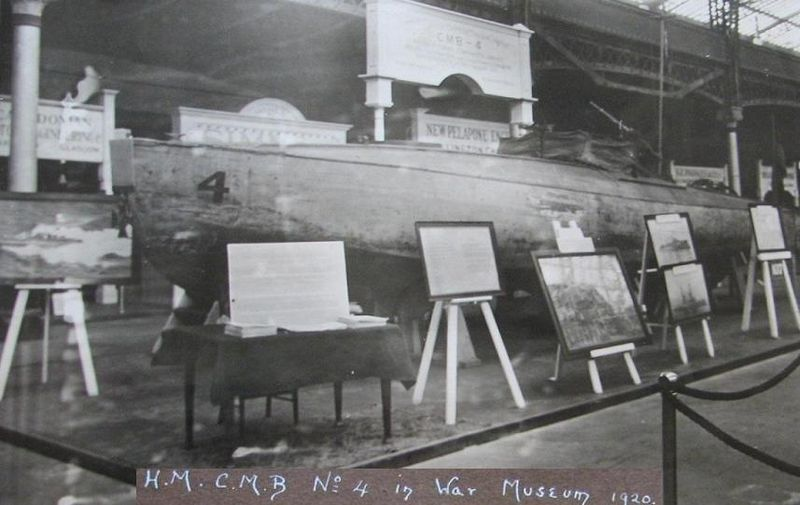
- HM CMB No 4 in Imperial War Museum London (1920)

History

United Kingdom
- Name: HM Coastal Motor Boat 4
- Ordered: 1916
- Builder: John I. Thornycroft & Company
- Acquired: 1916
- Out of service: 1919
- Status: Museum ship

General characteristics
- Type: Coastal Motor Boat
- Displacement: 5 tons
- Length: 45 ft (14 m)
- Beam: 8 ft 6 in (2.59 m)
- Draft: 2 ft 9 in (0.84 m)
- Propulsion: 1 shaft Thornycroft V-12 petrol engine which developed 275 bhp (205 kW)
- Speed: 24.8 kn (45.9 km/h; 28.5 mph)
- Complement: 3
- Armament: 1 × 18-inch torpedo

HM Coastal Motor Boat 4 is the torpedo boat used when Lieutenant Augustus Agar earned a Victoria Cross for carrying out a raid on Soviet warships in Kronstadt and sinking the cruiser Oleg.

It was one of a large series of small, fast, shallow draught Coastal Motor Boats used during the First World War. She was designed by John I. Thornycroft & Company of Hampton, England, ordered in January 1916, built by them and delivered that summer.

CMB 4 was 45 feet (14 m) long and 8 ft 6 in (2.59 m) in the beam. She displaced 5 tons drawing 2 ft 9 in (0.84 m) of water. Power was a 275 bhp (205 kW) Thornycroft V-12 petrol engine driving a single propeller and achieved a top speed of 24.8 knots (45.9 km/h). The boat was armed with one 18 inch (450 mm) torpedo and two single .303 in (7.62 mm) Lewis machine guns for the attack on Oleg. It was operated by a crew of three.

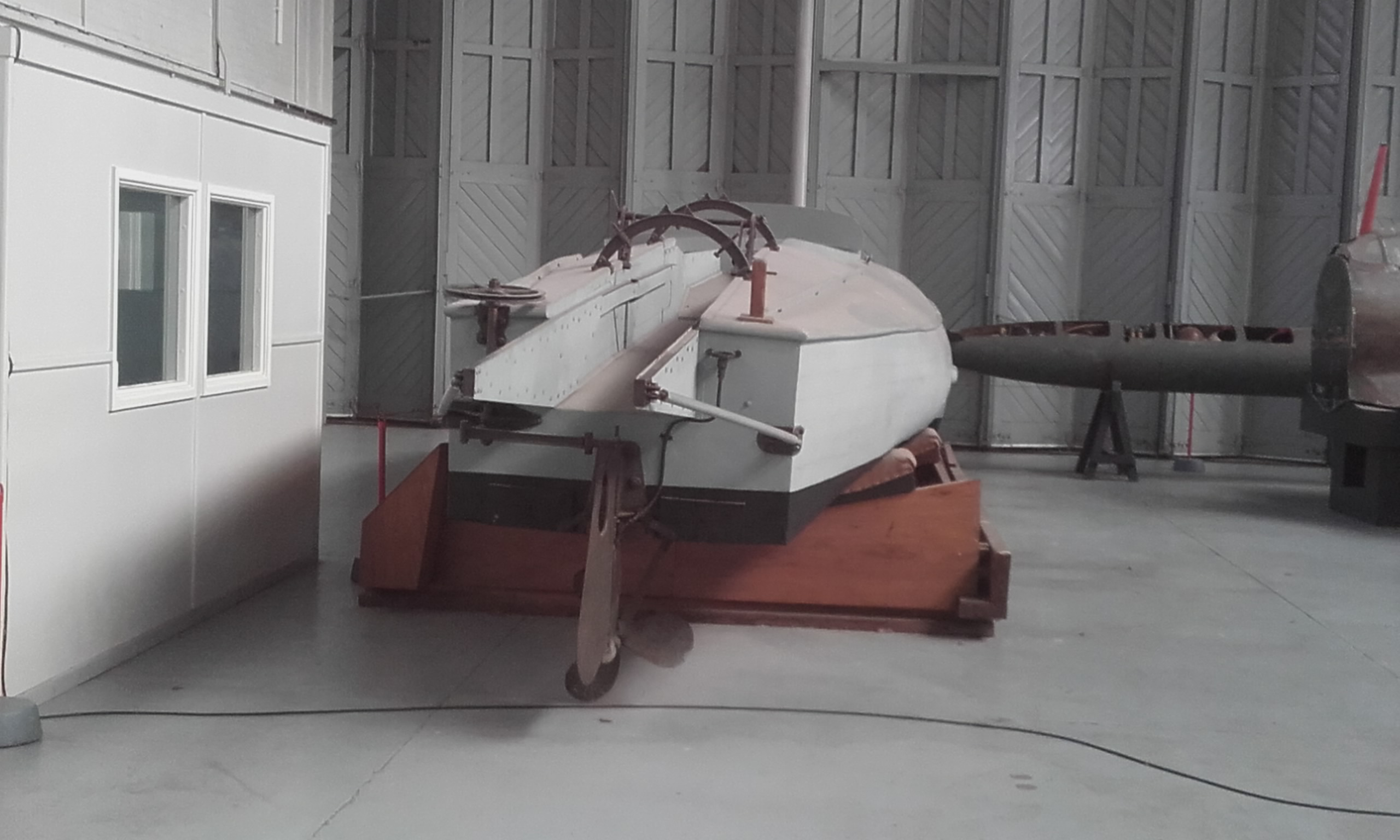
HM Coastal Motor Boat 4 on display at the Imperial War Museum Duxford in October 2017.

In May 1916, Lieutenant W. N. T. Beckett took command of the newly built HM Coastal Motor Boat 4. In December 1916 he proceeded to Dunkirk in charge of the 3rd CMB Division and operated on the Belgian coast. Beckett was in command of a Divisional CMB attack on German destroyers at Zeebrugge on 7 April 1917; as a result one was sunk and one very seriously damaged. For these actions Beckett was mentioned in Despatches and was awarded the Distinguished Service Cross (DSC).

The boat, under the command of Lieutenant Augustus Agar, was made famous by his part in the British operations in the Baltic Sea against the Bolsheviks in 1919, where she operated with her sister ships in activities such as the raid on Kronstadt.

After the action the boat was returned to the United Kingdom, where it was on display first at the Imperial War Museum in London and then at the Vosper works on Platt's Eyot (island) on the River Thames near Kingston for many years with a Victoria Cross painted on the side until the Vosper works there closed. It was then restored and displayed (with details of the action but with the painted VC removed) at the Imperial War Museum's out-station Imperial War Museum Duxford near Cambridge. In July 2019 the boat was moved to Boathouse 4 in the Portsmouth Historic Dockyard, where she is being displayed above a full-size, working replica being constructed by volunteers. The replica boat will be ready for sea trials in the spring of 2022. CMB 4 remains in the ownership of the Imperial War Museum, and is currently on loan to Boathouse 4.

Agar's VC is held by the Imperial War Museum in London.

The boat was inscribed on the National Register of Historic Vessels in May 1996, becoming part of the National Historic Fleet.

== See also ==
- Harbour Defence Motor Launch
- Coastal Forces of the Royal Navy
