= List of shipwrecks in 1919 =

The list of shipwrecks in 1919 includes ships sunk, foundered, grounded, or otherwise lost during 1919.

table of contents
1919
Jan	Feb	Mar	Apr
May	Jun	Jul	Aug
Sep	Oct	Nov	Dec
Unknown date

== January ==
=== 1 January ===
List of shipwrecks: 1 January 1919
Ship	State	Description
HMS Iolaire	Royal Navy	The naval yacht ran aground on the Beasts of Holm, Stornoway, Isle of Lewis and sank with the loss of 205 of the people on board.
USS Northern Pacific	United States Navy	USS Northern Pacific The troopship ran aground off Fire Island, New York, She was refloated on 18 January.

=== 2 January ===
List of shipwrecks: 2 January 1919
Ship	State	Description
Nanyo Maru	Japan	The cargo ship foundered off Tukuyama, Hokkaidō with the loss of all hands.
Polly and Emily	France	The schooner ran aground off Ambleteuse, Pas-de-Calais, France. Her crew were rescued.

=== 3 January ===
List of shipwrecks: 3 January 1919
Ship	State	Description
Fairhaven	United Kingdom	The cargo ship ran aground 1.5 nautical miles (2.8 km) off Walney Island, Lancashire. Her crew were rescued. She later broke her back.
William Morton	United Kingdom	The schooner foundered 10 nautical miles (19 km) south of Cape Sacratif, Spain with the loss of three of her crew.

=== 4 January ===
List of shipwrecks: 4 January 1919
Ship	State	Description
Amazon	United States	The motor vessel capsized in the Pacific Ocean two miles (3.2 km) south of Point Robinson. Six crewmen killed.
Temple E. Dore	United States	The cargo ship caught fire and sank at Colimar, Cuba.

=== 5 January ===
List of shipwrecks: 5 January 1919
Ship	State	Description
Earnholm	United Kingdom	The steamship foundered 17 nautical miles (31 km) south of "Okratag", Faroe Islands. She was on a voyage from "Vaag" to Aberdeen.
War Marvel	United Kingdom	The cargo ship lost her rudder and sprang a leak in the Atlantic Ocean and was abandoned. All 38 crew were rescued by Absaroka (United States).

=== 6 January ===
List of shipwrecks: 6 January 1919
Ship	State	Description
Vila de Buarcos	Portugal	The sailing ship was abandoned in the Bay of Biscay off Ouessant, Finistère, France. All eleven crew were rescued by Malte (France).

=== 8 January ===
List of shipwrecks: 8 January 1919
Ship	State	Description
Ribbleton	United Kingdom	The steamship departed from Kilkeel, County Down for Cardiff, Glamorgan. No further trace, reported missing.
Westgate	United Kingdom	The cargo ship collided with Bayano (United Kingdom) and foundered in the Atlantic Ocean off the Wolf Rock, Cornwall. She was on a voyage from Barry, Glamorgan to Malta.

=== 9 January ===
List of shipwrecks: 9 January 1919
Ship	State	Description
Knut Jarl	Norway	The cargo ship collided with Impoco (United Kingdom) and Munin (Norway) in the River Seine at Rouen, France and was beached.

=== 10 January ===
List of shipwrecks: 10 January 1919
Ship	State	Description
Calista	United Kingdom	She was sighted in Ballaghennie Bay whilst on a voyage from Preston, Lancashire to Dublin. No further trace, reported missing.
Fleetwing	United Kingdom	The schooner was driven ashore at Bels Point, Caernarfonshire and was wrecked with the loss of one of her five crew.
Northumbria	United Kingdom	The cargo ship struck two mines and sank in the North Sea with the loss of twelve of her fourteen crew; one buried in Renton, six buried in Embleton, Northumberland.

=== 11 January ===
List of shipwrecks: 11 January 1919
Ship	State	Description
Castalia	United States	The steamship foundered in the Atlantic Ocean 60 nautical miles (110 km) south of Canso, Nova Scotia, Canada. One crewman died in the sinking and four of exposure. Forty-six survivors were rescued by Bergensfjord (Norway). Castalia was on a voyage from Sydney, Nova Scotia to New York.
Yuna	United States	The steamer was wrecked on Mouchoir Bank. Sixty-four people died.

=== 13 January ===
List of shipwrecks: 13 January 1919
Ship	State	Description
Effort	United States	The 24-gross register ton motor vessel was destroyed by fire on the coast of Southeast Alaska between Kasaan, Territory of Alaska, and Twelve Mile Arm (55.4583333°N 132.6433333°W). Her crew of two survived.

=== 15 January ===
List of shipwrecks: 15 January 1919
Ship	State	Description
Chaouia	France	The passenger ship struck a mine and sank in the Strait of Messina (38°18′N 15°41′E) with the loss of 476 lives.
La Canadienne	Canada	The steamer was wrecked off Elmswood Island.

=== 16 January ===
List of shipwrecks: 16 January 1919
Ship	State	Description
USS Lake Erie	United States Navy	The collier was sunk in a collision with Hazel Branch (United Kingdom) five miles (8.0 km) off Cardiff, Wales. Raised in August, sold in November, repaired and returned to service as Gezina (Norway).

=== 17 January ===
List of shipwrecks: 17 January 1919
Ship	State	Description
Glenogle	United Kingdom	The cargo liner ran aground on the Syriam Flats, off Rangoon, Burma. She hogged and broke in two and was a total loss.

=== 20 January ===
List of shipwrecks: 20 January 1919
Ship	State	Description
Ruth	United States	The fishing schooner sank in the harbor at South Boston, Massachusetts after being rammed by the tug Piedmont (United States).

=== 21 January ===
List of shipwrecks: 21 January 1919
Ship	State	Description
SM UC-40	Imperial German Navy	The Type UC II submarine foundered in the North Sea (54°55′N 4°47′E) with the loss of a crew member.

=== 22 January ===
List of shipwrecks: 22 January 1919
Ship	State	Description
Espada	United States	The schooner ran aground on the Mumbulau Reef, Fiji and was wrecked. Her crew survived.
325	French Navy	The torpedo boat struck a mine and sank in the Gulf of Gabès off the Kerkennah Islands, Tunisia with the loss of eighteen of her crew.

=== 23 January ===
List of shipwrecks: 23 January 1919
Ship	State	Description
No. 325	French Navy	The torpedo boat struck a mine and sank in the Mediterranean Sea off Tunis, Tunisia.
Marguerite III	France	The cargo ship sprang a leak in the Irish Sea off the Wyre Lighthouse and was abandoned. Her crew survived.

=== 25 January ===
List of shipwrecks: 25 January 1919
Ship	State	Description
E. Starr Jones	United States	The schooner ran aground off Montevideo, Uruguay and was wrecked.

=== 28 January ===
List of shipwrecks: 28 January 1919
Ship	State	Description
Reine d'Arvor	France	The schooner was wrecked at Port Quin, Cornwall, United Kingdom. Her crew were rescued by Brook (United Kingdom).

=== 29 January ===
List of shipwrecks: 29 January 1919
Ship	State	Description
Algeria	Sweden	The steamship foundered in the North Sea 1 1/2 nautical miles (2.8 km) off the Tongue Lightship ( Trinity House). She was on a voyage from Gothenburg to Genoa, Italy.
USS Piave or USAT Piave	United States Navy or United States Army	The cargo ship, sources cite both United States Army or United States Navy ownership, ran aground on the Goodwin Sands, Kent, United Kingdom. She broke in two in a snowstorm on 31 January. At least 30 of her 90 crew were rescued by the Deal Lifeboat; The Ramsgate Lifeboat rescued 23 crew.
Sphynx	Sweden	The cargo ship struck a mine and sank east of Scotland with the loss of seventeen crew, including the master. Only one survivor.

=== 30 January ===
List of shipwrecks: 30 January 1919
Ship	State	Description
Flirt	United States	The cargo ship caught fire in the Atlantic Ocean (25°07′N 56°09′W) and was abandoned. Eleven crew were rescued by City of Savannah (United States).
Nimrod	United Kingdom	The barquentine ran aground on the Barber Sands in the North Sea off the coast of Great Yarmouth Norfolk and sank with the loss of ten of her twelve crew.

== February ==
=== 1 February ===
List of shipwrecks: 1 February 1919
Ship	State	Description
USS Narragansett	United States Navy	USS Narragansett The troopship ran aground in the English Channel off Bembridge, Isle of Wight, United Kingdom. Over 3,500 people were successfully evacuated from the ship. She was refloated on 17 February.

=== 4 February ===
List of shipwrecks: 4 February 1919
Ship	State	Description
HMS Penarth	Royal Navy	The minesweeper struck a mine in the North Sea off the coast of Yorkshire, United Kingdom and sank with the loss of two of her 80 crew.

=== 5 February ===
List of shipwrecks: 5 February 1919
Ship	State	Description
Caledonia	United Kingdom	The paddle steamer collided with Kalfond (Norway) at Rouen, France and was beached.
Carmen	Denmark	The cargo ship struck a mine in the Skaggerak 20 nautical miles (37 km) south of Lista, Norway and sank with the loss of seventeen crew.
Therezina	Brazil	The cargo ship foundered in the Atlantic Ocean off Santos, São Paulo, Brazil.

=== 6 February ===
List of shipwrecks: 6 February 1919
Ship	State	Description
Sis	United Kingdom	The schooner ran aground at Point Saint Quentin, Somme, France and was abandoned by her crew.

=== 7 February ===
List of shipwrecks: 7 February 1919
Ship	State	Description
HMS Erin's Isle	Royal Navy	The minesweeper, a converted paddle steamer, was broken almost in two and sunk by a drifting mine in the Thames Estuary. Twenty-three of her crew were lost and 28 survived.

=== 8 February ===
List of shipwrecks: 8 February 1919
Ship	State	Description
Satsei Maru No.1	Japan	The cargo ship was wrecked on Daisee Island, Korea with the loss of all hands.
SM U-16	Imperial German Navy	The submarine foundered in the North Sea (58°59′N 8°29′E).
W. N. Zwicker	Canada	The schooner was wrecked at the entrance to the Pará River, Brazil.

=== 10 February ===
List of shipwrecks: 10 February 1919
Ship	State	Description
Joseph Davis	United Kingdom	The steamship was reported to be in a sinking condition 25 nautical miles (46 km) north west of Ouessant, Finistère, France. She was on a voyage from Cardiff, Glamorgan to Gibraltar. No further trace, reported missing.
SM UC-91	Imperial German Navy	The Type UC III submarine foundered in the North Sea (54°15′N 3°56′E) with the loss of seventeen of her crew.

=== 11 February ===
List of shipwrecks: 11 February 1919
Ship	State	Description
Accoma	United States	The steamship was abandoned in the Atlantic Ocean. She was on a voyage from New York to Marseille, Bouches-du-Rhône, France.

=== 13 February ===
List of shipwrecks: 13 February 1919
Ship	State	Description
Sassenheim	United States	The steamer went ashore on Handkerchief Shoal, Massachusetts.

=== 15 February ===
List of shipwrecks: 15 February 1919
Ship	State	Description
Hans	Norway	The cargo ship ran aground and sank in Fjensfjord, Norway.

=== 18 February ===
List of shipwrecks: 18 February 1919
Ship	State	Description
Mirabeau	French Navy	The battleship ran aground in the Black Sea off the coast of the Crimean Peninsula in a snowstorm. She was refloated on 6 April 1919 after the removal of 6,000 tonnes (5,900 long tons; 6,600 short tons) of weight, including her guns, turret armour, coal, and ammunition and the upper strake of her belt armor.

=== 20 February ===
List of shipwrecks: 20 February 1919
Ship	State	Description
SM UC-71	Imperial German Navy	The Type UC II submarine foundered, probably scuttled, in the North Sea (54°10′N 7°54′E).

=== 22 February ===
List of shipwrecks: 22 February 1919
Ship	State	Description
SM U-21	Imperial German Navy	The Type U 19 submarine foundered in the North Sea (54°19′N 3°42′W) whilst under tow.

=== 23 February ===
List of shipwrecks: 23 February 1919
Ship	State	Description
USS Sixaola	United States Navy	The cargo liner caught fire at Pier 7, Hoboken, New Jersey, or New York, and was filled up by fireboats and partially capsized and sank. Two killed. Raised a few months later, repaired and turned over to the United States Army.

=== 24 February ===
List of shipwrecks: 24 February 1919
Ship	State	Description
Philorth	United Kingdom	The steamship foundered in the Mediterranean Sea. She was on a voyage from Constantinople, Ottoman Empire to Malta.

=== 27 February ===
List of shipwrecks: 27 February 1919
Ship	State	Description
Taiun Maru No.8	Japan	The steamship foundered off Vuruga Bay.

=== 28 February ===
List of shipwrecks: 28 February 1919
Ship	State	Description
General Gordon	Norway	The barque was driven ashore 20 nautical miles (37 km) north of Tybee Island, Georgia, United States. Her crew were rescued by W. B. Keene (United States).
Lord Dufferin	United Kingdom	The cargo ship was in collision with Aquitania (United Kingdom) at New York, United States and sank. Her crew were rescued by Aquitania. She was later refloated and beached.

=== Unknown date ===
List of shipwrecks: Unknown date 1919
Ship	State	Description
Jan	Denmark	The cargo ship struck a mine in the English Channel and was damaged. She was beached at Dungeness, Kent, United Kingdom for temporary repairs to be carried out. She was later refloated and arrived in the River Thames at Higham, Kent on 9 February.

== March ==
=== 2 March ===
List of shipwrecks: 2 March 1919
Ship	State	Description
Lewis McDonald	United States	The 9-gross register ton motor vessel sank while at anchor in a cove in the southwestern part of Red Bay (56°20′N 133°18′W) on the coast of Prince of Wales Island in the Alexander Archipelago in Southeast Alaska when large waves broke over her during a snowstorm with high winds. The two people aboard survived.
Milos	Sweden	The cargo ship, en route from Blyth, Northumberland to Halmstad, struck a mine and sank off the Swedish west coast, with the loss of one crew.

=== 3 March ===
List of shipwrecks: 3 March 1919
Ship	State	Description
Hera	Finland	The cargo ship ran aground off Arholma, Sweden and sank.
SMS Senator Schaefer	Imperial German Navy	The Vorpostenboot was lost on this date.

=== 5 March ===
List of shipwrecks: 5 March 1893
Ship	State	Description
Kersaint	French Navy	The sloop-of-war was stranded on a reef at Tahiti.

=== 6 March ===
List of shipwrecks: 6 March 1919
Ship	State	Description
Ejdern	Sweden	The steam trawler, fishing northwest of Skagen in Denmark, sank with the loss of her entire crew of 10, apparently after striking a mine, which is considered proven by state of wreckage found on the Swedish coast.

=== 7 March ===
List of shipwrecks: 7 March 1919
Ship	State	Description
HNoMS Thor	Royal Norwegian Navy	The monitor ran aground in the Skagerrak off Verdens Ende, Norway, and sank with the loss of two lives.

=== 12 March ===
List of shipwrecks: 12 March 1919
Ship	State	Description
Prinsengracht	Netherlands	The steamship was abandoned at sea. She was on a voyage from Port Talbot, Glamorgan, United Kingdom to Barcelona, Spain.

=== 14 March ===
List of shipwrecks: 14 March 1919
Ship	State	Description
Yselhaven	United States	The cargo ship was sunk by a mine 20 miles (32 km) off Coquet Island, England, 40 miles (64 km) north east of Hartlepool (55°12′N 00°30′W). Ten crew killed. Survivors were rescued by Taycraig (United Kingdom) ten hours later.

=== 15 March ===
List of shipwrecks: 15 March 1919
Ship	State	Description
City of Gulfport	United States	The five-masted barquentine was destroyed by fire in the River Plate at Buenos Aires, Argentina.

=== 16 March ===
List of shipwrecks: 16 March 1919
Ship	State	Description
Nordanvind	Sweden	The cargo ship struck a mine and sank in the North Sea. The crew was saved.

=== 18 March ===
List of shipwrecks: 18 March 1919
Ship	State	Description
Bonovento	Denmark	The barque caught fire in the Indian Ocean south of Ceylon (approximately 4°N 82°E) and was abandoned. Her crew were rescued by Martinique (Denmark).

=== 19 March ===
List of shipwrecks: 19 March 1919
Ship	State	Description
Conservator	United Kingdom	The steam yacht foundered off Cardigan, Wales, United Kingdom. Her ten crew were rescued by Elizabeth Austin ( Royal National Lifeboat Institution).

=== 24 March ===
List of shipwrecks: 24 March 1919
Ship	State	Description
Cecil Fearn	United Kingdom	The schooner was driven ashore at Figuera, Cape Verde Islands, Portugal and was wrecked.

=== 27 March ===
List of shipwrecks: 27 March 1919
Ship	State	Description
Vincio	Spain	The cargo ship ran aground at Bayonne, Basses-Pyrénées, France and was a total loss.

=== 28 March ===
List of shipwrecks: 28 March 1919
Ship	State	Description
Conservator	United Kingdom	The cargo ship ran aground on the Black Rocks in the River Teifi and was wrecked.

=== Unknown date ===
List of shipwrecks: Unknown date in March 1919
Ship	State	Description
Castor II	Norway	The steamship capsized and sank in the North Sea. She was on a voyage from Sunderland, County Durham, United Kingdom to Porsgrunn.
Perun	Soviet Navy	Russian Civil War, Kronstadt Rebellion: The Uragan-class monitor was hit by artillery fire and severely damaged by fire at Kronstadt.

== April ==
=== 3 April ===
List of shipwrecks: 3 April 1919
Ship	State	Description
Allen A	United States	After her mooring lines broke during a storm, the 342-gross register ton three-masted schooner was blown 30 feet (9.1 m) up onto the beach at Baranoff (55°14′30″N 160°32′55″W) on Unga Island in the Territory of Alaska's Shumagin Islands. Declared a constructive total loss, she was later sold, rebuilt, and returned to service as the whaling and fur-trading vessel Fox (United States).

=== 6 April ===
List of shipwrecks: 6 April 1919
Ship	State	Description
Vulkan	United Kingdom	The salvage tug sank in the North Sea off Denmark (54°54′N 6°18′E) whilst under tow.

=== 9 April ===
List of shipwrecks: 9 April 1919
Ship	State	Description
Hastier	Belgium	The coaster, on her maiden voyage, departed Brixham, Devon, United Kingdom for Barcelona, Spain. A damaged lifeboat discovered on 21 June by Courier (United Kingdom) and landed at Guernsey Channel Islands.

=== 12 April ===
List of shipwrecks: 12 April 1919
Ship	State	Description
Carolus	Sweden	The cargo ship, en route from Halmstad to West Hartlepool, struck a mine from the World War I minefield at Herthas flak and sank with the loss of two crew.

=== 15 April ===
List of shipwrecks: 15 April 1919
Ship	State	Description
U-118	United Kingdom	U-118 The Type UE II submarine was driven ashore at Hastings, Sussex, United Kingdom. She was scrapped in situ between October and December 1919.

=== 16 April ===
List of shipwrecks: 16 April 1919
Ship	State	Description
Lusitania	Portugal	The schooner caught fire off Cemaes Head, Cardiganshire. Her crew was rescued by Elizabeth Austin ( Royal National Lifeboat Institution).

=== 17 April ===
List of shipwrecks: 17 April 1919
Ship	State	Description
USS Freehold	United States Navy	The minesweeping tug was sunk in New York Harbor while assisting with the docking of RMS Saxonia (United Kingdom) with the loss of a crew member. She was later raised, repaired and returned to service.

=== 18 April ===
List of shipwrecks: 18 April 1919
Ship	State	Description
Rosedale	Canada	The cargo ship collided with Luella (United States) in the Bristol Channel and sank. Her crew were rescued by Luella.

=== 19 April ===
List of shipwrecks: 19 April 1919
Ship	State	Description
Tyne	United Kingdom	The cargo ship collided with the brigantine Fleur de Mer (France) in Langland Bay, Glamorgan and cut her in two. Her five crew survived. Tyne then ran aground at Rotherslade, Glamorgan and broke her back. Her 50 crew were rescued. Tyne was on a voyage from London, United Kingdom to Swansea, Glamorgan, United Kingdom
Wild Rose	United Kingdom	The cargo ship collided with Afon Lledi (United Kingdom) off the coast of Cornwall, United Kingdom and sank with the loss of four of her crew.

=== 21 April ===
List of shipwrecks: 21 April 1919
Ship	State	Description
AG-21	Imperial Russian Navy White Movement	World War I: The AG-class submarine was scuttled at Sevastopol by the British.

=== 24 April ===
List of shipwrecks: 24 April 1919
Ship	State	Description
LV-51	United States Lighthouse Service	Within eight minutes of colliding with a barge under tow while she was relieving Cornfield Point Station, the 118-foot (36 m), 375-ton lightship sank in 190 feet (58 m) of water in Long Island Sound off Cornfield Point, Old Saybrook, Connecticut, approximately 2 nautical miles (3.7 km; 2.3 mi) south of Long Sand Shoal, 3.3 nautical miles (6.1 km; 3.8 mi) bearing 211° from Lynde Point Lighthouse at 41°12′N 072°22′W. Her entire crew of seven survived.
Solid	Sweden	The cargo ship, en route from Montrose to Karlstad, struck a mine at a position northeast of Skagen Lighthouse, and sank quickly. The crew was saved.

=== 27 April ===
List of shipwrecks: 27 April 1919
Ship	State	Description
USS Courtney	United States Navy	The naval trawler/minesweeper sank in a storm in the Bay of Biscay off Brest, Finistère, France.
USS Otis W. Douglas	United States Navy	The naval trawler/minesweeper sank in a storm in the Bay of Biscay off Brest, Finistère, France.

=== 28 April ===
List of shipwrecks: 28 April 1919
Ship	State	Description
Capitaine Beauchamp	France	The auxiliary schooner sank in a collision with the barge Detroit (United States) eight miles (13 km) north of Port Eads, Louisiana. The vessel was refloated 13 days later.
Detroit	United States	The barge sank in a collision with the schooner Capitaine Beauchamp (France) eight miles (13 km) north of Port Eads, Louisiana.
USS Gypsum Queen	United States Navy	The naval tug struck a rock, her boiler blew up and she sank in the Bay of Biscay off Brest, Finistère, France with the loss of 15 of her crew.
USS James	United States Navy	The naval trawler/minesweeper sprung a leak in a storm on 27 April and sank under tow in the Bay of Biscay off Brest, France on 28 April. Her crew were rescued by USS Marietta (United States Navy).
Valkyr	Sweden	The three-masted schooner ran aground at Birchington, Kent United Kingdom. She was on a voyage from Setubal, Portugal to Gothenburg. She was declared a total loss.

=== 29 April ===
List of shipwrecks: 29 April 1919
Ship	State	Description
Professor Koch	Finland	The barque stranded on Cox's Shoal off Scituate, Massachusetts.

=== Unknown date ===
List of shipwrecks: Unknown date 1919
Ship	State	Description
Borets za Svobodu	Soviet Navy	Russian Civil War: The pre-dreadnought battleship was scuttled at Sevastopol.
Dunvegan	United Kingdom	The cargo ship was driven aground at Margate, Kent. She was later repaired and refloated.

== May ==
=== 1 May ===
List of shipwrecks: 1 May 1919
Ship	State	Description
Ilim	Soviet Navy Red Movement	Russian Civil War: The gunboat was rammed and sunk on the Kama River by Pronzitelnyy (Soviet Navy). Raised on 12 June, repaired and returned to service.

=== 2 May ===
List of shipwrecks: 1 May 1919
Ship	State	Description
USS SC-58	United States Navy	The SC-1-class submarine chaser was destroyed in fire at Charleston, South Carolina. Sixteen (13 firefighters and 3 members of ship's crew) men were injured when one of SC-58's fuel tanks exploded.

=== 4 May ===
List of shipwrecks: 4 May 1919
Ship	State	Description
HMS Tryphon	Royal Navy	The destroyer ran aground in the Mediterranean. She was declared a constructive total loss.

=== 5 May ===
List of shipwrecks: 5 May 1919
Ship	State	Description
HMS Cupar	Royal Navy	The Aberdare-class minesweeper struck a mine and sank off the River Tyne.
SMS Leipzig	Imperial German Navy	The hulked sail corvette capsized in Wilhelmshaven. She was raised in 1921 and scrapped.
USS SC-343	United States Navy	The submarine chaser was sunk by an explosion in the engine room that set the vessel afire, while moored inside the breakwater in His Majesty's dockyard at Ireland Island, Bermuda. One killed, five wounded.

=== 9 May ===
List of shipwrecks: 9 May 1919
Ship	State	Description
Factor	United Kingdom	The cargo ship collided with Ursus (United Kingdom) in the North Sea 6 nautical miles (11 km) north east of Scarborough, Yorkshire and sank.
Peter	United States	Placed in a slough at Chena, Territory of Alaska in the autumn of 1918 before the onset of ice for the winter of 1918–1919, the 458-ton scow was carried away, crushed, and broken up by ice when the ice broke up in the spring while the river was unusually high.

=== 11 May ===
List of shipwrecks: 11 May 1919
Ship	State	Description
Lyubimets	Soviet Navy Red Movement	Russian Civil War: The gunboat was shelled and sunk on the Kama River by artillery. She was raised post-war and scrapped.

=== 13 May ===
List of shipwrecks: 13 May 1919
Ship	State	Description
Premier	United States	During a voyage from Grays Harbor, Washington, to Ugashik, Territory of Alaska, with ten crewmen and a cargo of 426 tons of lumber and salt on board, the 307.69-gross register ton, 141.7-foot (43.2 m) schooner was wrecked without loss of life at Cape Lutke on Unimak Island in the Aleutian Islands, about 18 nautical miles (33 km; 21 mi) east of Scotch Cap Light, during a snowstorm. The steamer Kvichak (United States) rescued all on board, but Premier was pounded to pieces as the surf broke over her and became a total loss.

=== 15 May ===
List of shipwrecks: 15 May 1919
Ship	State	Description
Derband	Soviet Union	Russian Civil War: Allied Intervention in the Russian Civil War: The schooner was sunk by gunfire by the auxiliary cruisers HMS Kruger and HMS Emile Nobel (both Royal Navy) in the Caspian Sea.
Nanticoke	United States	The schooner barge, under tow of Triton (United States), sank in a strong wind off Portsmouth, New Hampshire, or three miles (4.8 km) south south west of the Isles of Shoals. The captain and one crewman landed at Rye Beach, New Hampshire in her boat, the captain's wife and four children, and the engineer, died.
Useyn Abdad	Soviet Union	Russian Civil War: Allied Intervention in the Russian Civil War: The schooner was sunk by gunfire by the auxiliary cruisers HMS Kruger and HMS Emile Nobel (both Royal Navy) in the Caspian Sea.

=== 16 May ===
List of shipwrecks: 16 May 1919
Ship	State	Description
D. R. Hanna	United States	The cargo ship, a bulk carrier, was in Lake Huron during a voyage from Duluth, Minnesota, to Buffalo, New York, with a cargo of wheat when the cargo ship Quincy A. Shaw (United States) accidentally rammed her in Thunder Bay off Alpena, Michigan. She eventually rolled over and sank in 135 feet (41 m) of water at 45.084167°N 83.08655°W.

=== 19 May ===
List of shipwrecks: 19 May 1919
Ship	State	Description
No. 5	Soviet Navy	Russian Civil War: Allied Intervention in the Russian Civil War: Battle of Troitsa: The floating battery was bombed in the Dvina River by British aircraft, beached, and scuttled.

=== 20 May ===
List of shipwrecks: 20 May 1919
Ship	State	Description
Lake Placid	United States	The cargo ship was sunk by a mine 20 miles (32 km) off Vinga Light, near Gothenburg, Sweden.

=== 21 May ===
List of shipwrecks: 21 May 1919
Ship	State	Description
Demosthenes	Soviet Navy Russian Red forces	Russian Civil War, Allied intervention: Battle of Alexander Fort: The minelayer was damaged and abandoned after the explosion of Revel (Soviet Navy).
Gelma	Soviet Navy Russian Red forces	Russian Civil War, Allied intervention: Battle of Alexander Fort: The auxiliary vessel was destroyed by the explosion of Revel (Soviet Navy).
Moskvitianin	Soviet Navy Russian Red forces	Russian Civil War, Allied intervention: Battle of Alexander Fort: The Emir Bukharsky-class destroyer was sunk by ships of a British flotilla, or beached and abandoned after failures of gun and electrical systems during the battle, in Tyub-Karagan Bay in the Caspian Sea. The destroyer was bombed and damaged the next day by an aircraft from HMS Aladir Useynov. She was refloated on 10 January 1920 by White forces.
No. 2	Soviet Navy Russian Red forces	Russian Civil War, Allied intervention: Battle of Alexander Fort: The floating battery was shelled and sunk by HMS Kruger (Royal Navy). 12 crewmen were killed.
No. 107	Soviet Navy Red Movement	Russian Civil War: The gunboat was rammed and sunk on the Kama River by Tovarishch Markin (Soviet Navy).
Revel	Soviet Navy Russian Red forces	Russian Civil War, Allied intervention: Battle of Alexander Fort: The depot ship, loaded with a cargo of fuel, was shelled, caught fire and exploded.
Schastlivvy	Soviet Navy Russian Red forces	Russian Civil War, Allied intervention: Battle of Alexander Fort: The patrol boat was wrecked while trying to decoy the British ships during the battle.
Tuman	Soviet Navy Russian Red forces	Russian Civil War, Allied intervention: Battle of Alexander Fort: The mine carrier was destroyed by the explosion of Revel (Soviet Navy).
Zoroaster	Soviet Navy Russian Red forces	Russian Civil War, Allied intervention: Battle of Alexander Fort: The vessel was destroyed by the explosion of Revel (Soviet Navy).

=== 24 May ===
List of shipwrecks: 24 May 1919
Ship	State	Description
Alexander	Soviet Navy Red Movement	Russian Civil War: Battle of Yelabuga: The transport was shelled and sunk on the Kama River by artillery.
Roshal	Soviet Navy Red Movement	Russian Civil War: Battle of Yelabuga: The gunboat was shelled and damaged on the Kama River by HMS Kent (Royal Navy) and beached.
Terek	Soviet Navy Red Movement	Russian Civil War: Battle of Yelabuga: The gunboat was shelled and damaged on the Kama River by British and White Russian ships and beached. Captured by Whites and refloated ten days later.
Virginia	United States	The steamer burned near Smith's Point Light, at the mouth of the Potomac River. Six people were killed.

=== Unknown date ===
List of shipwrecks: Unknown date 1919
Ship	State	Description
Donetz	(Russia) Russian White forces	Russian Civil War: The gunboat sank in the Gulf of Tendra during a storm.
Terek	Soviet Navy	Russian Civil War: The Kuban-class minelayer was heavily damaged in the Kama River and was abandoned. Refloated and towed off by White Forces. Never repaired and destroyed by the Whites late in 1919.

== June ==
=== 2 June ===
List of shipwrecks: 2 June 1919
Ship	State	Description
Rucumilla	Chilean Navy	The H-class submarine sank near the naval base at Talcahuano, Chile, when a valve was left open inadvertently during a training dive. All 25 men on board survived. She later was refloated, repaired, and returned to service.
Skoryi	Russian Navy White Movement	Russian Civil War: The gunboat was shelled and damaged by artillery and run aground on the Kama River, pulled off and towed away.
Statnyi	Russian Navy White Movement	Russian Civil War: The gunboat was shelled and sunk on the Kama River by artillery.

=== 9 June ===
List of shipwrecks: 9 June 1919
Ship	State	Description
HMS L55	Royal Navy	Russian Civil War: British campaign in the Baltic: The L-class submarine was sunk by the Bolshevik Orfey-class minelayer-destroyers Gavril and Azard in the Gulf of Finland off Kronstadt. The Soviet Union refloated her in 1928, repaired her, and placed her in service as L55, later renamed Bezbozhnik (Soviet Navy).

=== 11 June ===
List of shipwrecks: 11 June 1919
Ship	State	Description
Yankee	United States	During a voyage from Norfolk, Virginia, to Boston, Massachusetts, with a cargo of coal, the 2,418-gross register ton steamer sank in 110 feet (34 m) of water in the North Atlantic Ocean off Fire Island Lighthouse on Fire Island off the south coast of Long Island, New York, 21 nautical miles (39 km; 24 mi) from Jones Inlet, after colliding in dense fog with the ocean liner Argentina (Italy). Argentina rescued all 30 people – eight passengers and 22 crew members – aboard Yankee.

=== 14 June ===
List of shipwrecks: 14 June 1919
Ship	State	Description
USS Patrol No. 7	United States Navy	The patrol vessel sank while in tow of USS SC-241 (United States Navy) between Scituate, Massachusetts, and Minot's Ledge about 15 miles (24 km) southeast of Boston Light, Massachusetts. The wreck was later raised and sold.

=== 15 June ===
List of shipwrecks: 15 June 1919
Ship	State	Description
Flottbeck	Imperial German Navy	The Ditmar Koel-class Vorpostenboot was sunk by mines 35 miles (56 km) north west of Norderney
Vesterby	Sweden	The cargo ship, en route from Antwerp to Kolding, sank after striking a mine in Danish waters. The crew was saved.

=== 16 June ===
List of shipwrecks: 16 June 1919
Ship	State	Description
HMS Kinross	Royal Navy	The Aberdare-class minesweeper struck a mine and sank in the Aegean Sea.

=== 17 June ===
List of shipwrecks: 17 June 1919
Ship	State	Description
Cairnside	United Kingdom	The cargo ship ran aground in the North Sea off Aldeburgh, Suffolk and was wrecked. Her crew were rescued by Vaunter (United Kingdom).

=== 18 June ===
List of shipwrecks: 18 June 1919
Ship	State	Description
Oleg	Soviet Navy	Russian Civil War, British campaign in the Baltic: The Bogatyr-class protected cruiser was torpedoed and sunk by the motor torpedo boat HM CMB-4 (Royal Navy) off Kronstadt. Five crewmen were killed, five others wounded.

=== 21 June ===
List of shipwrecks: 21 June 1919
Ship	State	Description
SMS B109	Imperial German Navy	Scuttling of the German fleet at Scapa Flow: The B97-class destroyer was scuttled in Scapa Flow, Orkney Islands, United Kingdom. She was raised in March 1926 and scrapped.
SMS B110	Imperial German Navy	Scuttling of the German fleet at Scapa Flow: The B97-class destroyer was scuttled in Scapa Flow. She was raised in December 1925 and scrapped.
SMS B111	Imperial German Navy	Scuttling of the German fleet at Scapa Flow: The B97-class destroyer was scuttled in Scapa Flow. She was raised in March 1926 and scrapped.
SMS B112	Imperial German Navy	Scuttling of the German fleet at Scapa Flow: The B97-class destroyer was scuttled in Scapa Flow. She was raised in February 1926 and scrapped.
SMS Baden	Imperial German Navy	SMS Frankfurt (left) and SMS Baden Scuttling of the German fleet at Scapa Flow: The Bayern-class battleship was beached in Scapa Flow. She was refloated in July. Subsequently repaired and entered Royal Navy service.
SMS Bayern	Imperial German Navy	SMS Bayern Scuttling of the German fleet at Scapa Flow: The Bayern-class battleship was scuttled in Scapa Flow. She was raised in September 1934 and scrapped.
SMS Bremse	Imperial German Navy	Scuttling of the German fleet at Scapa Flow: The Brummer-class cruiser was scuttled in Scapa Flow. She was raised on 29 November 1930 and scrapped.
SMS Brummer	Imperial German Navy	Scuttling of the German fleet at Scapa Flow: The Brummer-class cruiser was scuttled in Scapa Flow, where she remains as of 2026.
SMS Cöln	Imperial German Navy	Scuttling of the German fleet at Scapa Flow: The Cöln-class cruiser was scuttled in Scapa Flow, where she remains as of 2026.
SMS Dresden	Imperial German Navy	Scuttling of the German fleet at Scapa Flow: The Cöln-class cruiser was scuttled in Scapa Flow, where she remains as of 2026.
SMS Derfflinger	Imperial German Navy	SMS Derfflinger Scuttling of the German fleet at Scapa Flow: The Derfflinger-class battlecruiser was scuttled in Scapa Flow. She was raised in 1939 and anchored in a capsized state off Rysa Little until 1946, when she was scrapped.
SMS Emden	Imperial German Navy	Scuttling of the German fleet at Scapa Flow: The Königsberg-class cruiser was beached in Scapa Flow. She was later refloated and passed to the French Navy in 1920.
SMS Frankfurt	Imperial German Navy	Scuttling of the German fleet at Scapa Flow: The Wiesbaden-class cruiser was beached in Scapa Flow. She was refloated in July 1920 and subsequently passed to the United States Navy.
SMS Friedrich der Grosse	Imperial German Navy	Scuttling of the German fleet at Scapa Flow: The Kaiser-class battleship was scuttled in Scapa Flow. She was raised in 1936 and scrapped.
SMS G38	Imperial German Navy	Scuttling of the German fleet at Scapa Flow: The G37-class torpedo boat was scuttled in Scapa Flow. She was raised in 1936 and scrapped.
SMS G39	Imperial German Navy	Scuttling of the German fleet at Scapa Flow: The G37-class torpedo boat was scuttled in Scapa Flow. She was raised on 3 July 1925 and scrapped.
SMS G40	Imperial German Navy	Scuttling of the German fleet at Scapa Flow: The G37-class torpedo boat was scuttled in Scapa Flow. She was raised in 1925 and scrapped.
SMS G86	Imperial German Navy	Scuttling of the German fleet at Scapa Flow: The G85-class torpedo boat was beached in Scapa Flow. She was later raised scrapped.
SMS G89	Imperial German Navy	Scuttling of the German fleet at Scapa Flow: The G85-class torpedo boat was beached in Scapa Flow. She was later raised scrapped.
SMS G91	Imperial German Navy	Scuttling of the German fleet at Scapa Flow: The G85-class torpedo boat was beached in Scapa Flow. She was later raised scrapped.
SMS G92	Imperial German Navy	Scuttling of the German fleet at Scapa Flow: The G85-class torpedo boat was beached in Scapa Flow. She was later raised scrapped.
SMS G101	Imperial German Navy	Scuttling of the German fleet at Scapa Flow: The G101-class destroyer was scuttled in Scapa Flow. She was raised in April 1926 and scrapped.
SMS G102	Imperial German Navy	SMS G102 Scuttling of the German fleet at Scapa Flow: The G101-class destroyer was scuttled in Scapa Flow. She was later refloated and passed to the United States Navy.
SMS G103	Imperial German Navy	Scuttling of the German fleet at Scapa Flow: The G101-class destroyer was scuttled in Scapa Flow. She was raised in September 1925 and scrapped.
SMS G104	Imperial German Navy	Scuttling of the German fleet at Scapa Flow: The G101-class destroyer was scuttled in Scapa Flow. She was raised in April 1926 and scrapped.
SMS H145	Imperial German Navy	Scuttling of the German fleet at Scapa Flow: The Grosses Torpedoboot 1913-class torpedo boat was scuttled in Scapa Flow. She was raised in March 1925 and scrapped.
SMS Hindenburg	Imperial German Navy	SMS Hindenburg Scuttling of the German fleet at Scapa Flow: The Derfflinger-class battlecruiser was scuttled in Scapa Flow. She was raised on 29 July 1930 and scrapped.
SMS Grosser Kurfürst	Imperial German Navy	Scuttling of the German fleet at Scapa Flow: The König-class battleship was scuttled in Scapa Flow. She was raised on 29 April 1938 and scrapped.
SMS Kaiser	Imperial German Navy	Scuttling of the German fleet at Scapa Flow: The Kaiser-class battleship was scuttled in Scapa Flow. She was raised in 1929 and scrapped the next year.
SMS Kaiserin	Imperial German Navy	Scuttling of the German fleet at Scapa Flow: The Kaiser-class battleship was scuttled in Scapa Flow. She was raised on 14 May 1936 and scrapped.
SMS Karlsruhe	Imperial German Navy	Scuttling of the German fleet at Scapa Flow: The Königsberg-class cruiser was scuttled in Scapa Flow, where she remains as of 2026.
SMS König	Imperial German Navy	Scuttling of the German fleet at Scapa Flow: The König-class battleship was scuttled in Scapa Flow, where she remains as of 2026.
SMS König Albert	Imperial German Navy	Scuttling of the German fleet at Scapa Flow: The Kaiser-class battleship was scuttled in Scapa Flow. She was raised on 31 July 1935 and scrapped.
SMS Kronprinz Wilhelm	Imperial German Navy	Scuttling of the German fleet at Scapa Flow: The König-class battleship was scuttled in Scapa Flow, where she remains as of 2026.
SMS Markgraf	Imperial German Navy	Scuttling of the German fleet at Scapa Flow: The König-class battleship was scuttled in Scapa Flow, where she remains as of 2026.
SMS Moltke	Imperial German Navy	Scuttling of the German fleet at Scapa Flow: The Moltke-class battlecruiser was scuttled in Scapa Flow. She was raised in 1927 and scrapped two years later.
North Land	United States	The steamer ran aground on Uest Island near New Bedford, Massachusetts.
SMS Nürnberg	Imperial German Navy	Scuttling of the German fleet at Scapa Flow: The Königsberg-class cruiser was beached in Scapa Flow. She was refloated in July 1919 and subsequently sunk as a target in 1922.
SMS Prinzregent Luitpold	Imperial German Navy	Scuttling of the German fleet at Scapa Flow: The Kaiser-class battleship was scuttled in Scapa Flow. She was raised on 9 July 1931 and scrapped.
SMS S32	Imperial German Navy	Scuttling of the German fleet at Scapa Flow: The Grosses Torpedoboot 1913-class torpedo boat was scuttled in Scapa Flow. She was raised in June 1925 and scrapped.
SMS S36	Imperial German Navy	Scuttling of the German fleet at Scapa Flow: The Grosses Torpedoboot 1913-class torpedo boat was scuttled in Scapa Flow. She was raised in April 1925 and scrapped.
SMS S49	Imperial German Navy	Scuttling of the German fleet at Scapa Flow: The Grosses Torpedoboot 1913-class torpedo boat was scuttled in Scapa Flow. She was raised in December 1924 and scrapped.
SMS S50	Imperial German Navy	Scuttling of the German fleet at Scapa Flow: The Grosses Torpedoboot 1913-class torpedo boat was scuttled in Scapa Flow. She was raised in October 1924 and scrapped.
SMS S51	Imperial German Navy	Scuttling of the German fleet at Scapa Flow: The Grosses Torpedoboot 1913-class torpedo boat was beached in Scapa Flow. She was later refloated and passed to the Admiralty.
SMS S52	Imperial German Navy	Scuttling of the German fleet at Scapa Flow: The Grosses Torpedoboot 1913-class torpedo boat was scuttled in Scapa Flow. She was raised in October 1924 and scrapped.
SMS S53	Imperial German Navy	Scuttling of the German fleet at Scapa Flow: The Grosses Torpedoboot 1913-class torpedo boat was scuttled in Scapa Flow. She was raised in August 1925 and scrapped.
SMS S54	Imperial German Navy	Scuttling of the German fleet at Scapa Flow: The Grosses Torpedoboot 1913-class torpedo boat was scuttled in Scapa Flow. She was partially salvaged.
SMS S55	Imperial German Navy	Scuttling of the German fleet at Scapa Flow: The Grosses Torpedoboot 1913-class torpedo boat was scuttled in Scapa Flow. She was raised in August 1924 and scrapped.
SMS S56	Imperial German Navy	Scuttling of the German fleet at Scapa Flow: The Grosses Torpedoboot 1913-class torpedo boat was scuttled in Scapa Flow. She was raised in June 1925 and scrapped.
SMS S60	Imperial German Navy	Scuttling of the German fleet at Scapa Flow: The Grosses Torpedoboot 1913-class torpedo boat was beached in Scapa Flow. She was later refloated and transferred to the Imperial Japanese Navy as a war reparation, but scrapped in England in 1920.
SMS S65	Imperial German Navy	Scuttling of the German fleet at Scapa Flow: The Grosses Torpedoboot 1913-class torpedo boat was scuttled in Scapa Flow. She was raised in May 1922 and scrapped.
SMS S131	Imperial German Navy	Scuttling of the German fleet at Scapa Flow: The Grosses Torpedoboot 1913-class torpedo boat was scuttled in Scapa Flow. She was raised in August 1924 and scrapped.
SMS S132	Imperial German Navy	Scuttling of the German fleet at Scapa Flow: The Grosses Torpedoboot 1913-class torpedo boat was beached in Scapa Flow. She was later refloated and passed to the United States Navy.
SMS S136	Imperial German Navy	Scuttling of the German fleet at Scapa Flow: The Grosses Torpedoboot 1913-class torpedo boat was scuttled in Scapa Flow. She was raised in April 1925 and scrapped.
SMS S137	Imperial German Navy	Scuttling of the German fleet at Scapa Flow: The Grosses Torpedoboot 1913-class torpedo boat was beached in Scapa Flow. She was later refloated and passed to the Admiralty.
SMS S138	Imperial German Navy	Scuttling of the German fleet at Scapa Flow: The Grosses Torpedoboot 1913-class torpedo boat was scuttled in Scapa Flow. She was raised in May 1925 and scrapped.
SMS Seydlitz	Imperial German Navy	SMS Seydlitz Scuttling of the German fleet at Scapa Flow: The Seydlitz-class battlecruiser was scuttled in Scapa Flow. She was raised on 2 November 1928 and scrapped.
SMS V43	Imperial German Navy	Scuttling of the German fleet at Scapa Flow: The Grosses Torpedoboot 1913-class torpedo boat was beached in Scapa Flow. She was later refloated and passed to the United States Navy.
SMS V44	Imperial German Navy	Scuttling of the German fleet at Scapa Flow: The Grosses Torpedoboot 1913-class torpedo boat was beached in Scapa Flow. She was later refloated and passed to the Admiralty.
SMS V45	Imperial German Navy	Scuttling of the German fleet at Scapa Flow: The Grosses Torpedoboot 1913-class torpedo boat was scuttled in Scapa Flow. She was raised in 1924 and scrapped.
SMS V46	Imperial German Navy	Scuttling of the German fleet at Scapa Flow: The Grosses Torpedoboot 1913-class torpedo boat was beached in Scapa Flow. She was later refloated and passed to the French Navy.
SMS V70	Imperial German Navy	Scuttling of the German fleet at Scapa Flow: The Grosses Torpedoboot 1913-class torpedo boat was scuttled in Scapa Flow. She was raised in August 1924 and scrapped.
SMS V73	Imperial German Navy	Scuttling of the German fleet at Scapa Flow: The Grosses Torpedoboot 1913-class torpedo boat was beached in Scapa Flow. She was later refloated and passed to the Admiralty.
SMS V78	Imperial German Navy	Scuttling of the German fleet at Scapa Flow: The Grosses Torpedoboot 1913-class torpedo boat was scuttled in Scapa Flow. She was raised in September 1925 and scrapped.
SMS V80	Imperial German Navy	Scuttling of the German fleet at Scapa Flow: The V67-class torpedo boat was beached in Scapa Flow. She was later refloated and transferred to the Imperial Japanese Navy as a war reparation, but scrapped in England in 1920.
SMS V81	Imperial German Navy	Scuttling of the German fleet at Scapa Flow: The Grosses Torpedoboot 1913-class torpedo boat was beached in Scapa Flow. She was later refloated but sunk whilst under tow to be scrapped.
SMS V82	Imperial German Navy	Scuttling of the German fleet at Scapa Flow: The Grosses Torpedoboot 1913-class torpedo boat was beached in Scapa Flow. She was later refloated and passed to the Admiralty.
SMS V83	Imperial German Navy	Scuttling of the German fleet at Scapa Flow: The Grosses Torpedoboot 1913-class torpedo boat was scuttled in Scapa Flow. She was raised in 1923 and scrapped.
SMS V86	Imperial German Navy	Scuttling of the German fleet at Scapa Flow: The Grosses Torpedoboot 1913-class torpedo boat was scuttled in Scapa Flow. She was raised in July 1925 and scrapped.
SMS V89	Imperial German Navy	Scuttling of the German fleet at Scapa Flow: The Grosses Torpedoboot 1913-class torpedo boat was scuttled in Scapa Flow. She was raised in December 1922 and scrapped.
SMS V91	Imperial German Navy	Scuttling of the German fleet at Scapa Flow: The Grosses Torpedoboot 1913-class torpedo boat was scuttled in Scapa Flow. She was raised in September 1924 and scrapped.
SMS V100	Imperial German Navy	Scuttling of the German fleet at Scapa Flow: The V99-class destroyer was beached in Scapa Flow. She was later refloated and passed to the French Navy.
SMS V125	Imperial German Navy	Scuttling of the German fleet at Scapa Flow: The V125-class torpedo boat was beached in Scapa Flow. She was later refloated and passed to the Admiralty.
SMS V126	Imperial German Navy	Scuttling of the German fleet at Scapa Flow: The V125-class torpedo boat was beached in Scapa Flow. She was later refloated and passed to the French Navy.
SMS V127	Imperial German Navy	Scuttling of the German fleet at Scapa Flow: The V125-class torpedo boat was beached in Scapa Flow. She was later refloated and passed to the Imperial Japanese Navy.
SMS V128	Imperial German Navy	Scuttling of the German fleet at Scapa Flow: The V125-class torpedo boat was beached in Scapa Flow. She was later refloated and passed to the Admiralty.
SMS V129	Imperial German Navy	Scuttling of the German fleet at Scapa Flow: The V125-class torpedo boat was scuttled in Scapa Flow. She was raised in August 1925 and scrapped.
SMS Von der Tann	Imperial German Navy	Scuttling of the German fleet at Scapa Flow: The battlecruiser was scuttled in Scapa Flow. She was raised on 7 December 1930, scrapping started in 1931 and was completed in 1934.

=== 22 June ===
List of shipwrecks: 22 June 1919
Ship	State	Description
Pericles	Russian Navy White Movement	Russian Civil War: The motor sailer was shelled and sunk at Henichesk by Soviet Armored Trains Nº. 4 and Nº. 85. Three crewmen and her commanding officer were killed.

=== 24 June ===
List of shipwrecks: 24 June 1919
Ship	State	Description
HMS Sword Dance	Royal Navy	Russian Civil War, North Russia Intervention: The Dance-class minesweeper struck a mine and sank in the Dvina River in Russia. One crewman killed.

=== 27 June ===
List of shipwrecks: 27 June 1919
Ship	State	Description
Thomas	United Kingdom	The schooner caught fire in the Atlantic Ocean 80 nautical miles (150 km) north east of Barbados and was abandoned. Her crew were rescued by the schooner Lillian (United Kingdom).

=== 28 June ===
List of shipwrecks: 28 June 1919
Ship	State	Description
Duchess of Richmond	United Kingdom	The paddle steamer struck a mine and sank in the Mediterranean Sea.
Slutskyi	Soviet Navy	Russian Civil War: The hydrographic vessel was shelled and sunk by White artillery off Unitsa in Lake Onega.

=== Unknown date ===
List of shipwrecks: Unknown date 1919
Ship	State	Description
Erinpura	United Kingdom	The cargo ship ran aground on Great Hanish Island, Aden Protectorate in mid-June. She was declared a total loss on 19 August 1920.
T-5	Merivoimat	Russian Civil War: The minesweeper was sunk by mines.
Terek	Russian Navy White Movement	Russian Civil War: The gunboat was scuttled on the Kama River at the end of June.

== July ==
=== 3 July ===
List of shipwrecks: 3 July 1919
Ship	State	Description
HMS Fandango	Royal Navy	Russian Civil War, North Russia Intervention: The Dance-class minesweeper struck a mine and sank in the Dvina River in Russia. Eight crewmen were killed.

=== 5 July ===
List of shipwrecks: 5 July 1919
Ship	State	Description
MP-1	Merivoimat	Russian Civil War: The minesweeper was sunk by mines.

=== 12 July ===
List of shipwrecks: 12 July 1919
Ship	State	Description
USS Richard Bulkeley	United States Navy	The minesweeper struck a mine and sank in the North Sea with the loss of seven of her 25 crew.

=== 15 July ===
List of shipwrecks: 15 July 1919
Ship	State	Description
Derband	Soviet Union	Russian Civil War: The cargo schooner was shelled and sunk in the Caspian Sea by HMS Emile Nobel and HMS Kruger (both Royal Navy).
Useyn Abbad	Soviet Union	Russian Civil War: The cargo schooner was shelled and sunk in the Caspian Sea by HMS Emile Nobel and HMS Kruger (both Royal Navy).

=== 16 July ===
List of shipwrecks: 16 July 1919
Ship	State	Description
HMS Gentian	Royal Navy	Russian Civil War, British campaign in the Baltic: The Arabis-class sloop-of-war struck a mine and sank in the Gulf of Finland.
HMS Myrtle	Royal Navy	Russian Civil War, British campaign in the Baltic: The Acacia-class sloop-of-war struck a mine and sank in the Gulf of Finland.

=== 19 July ===
List of shipwrecks: 19 July 1919
Ship	State	Description
HMS ML 127	Royal Navy	The Elco-type submarine chaser was destroyed by fire in Bridlington harbour, Yorkshire, United Kingdom.

=== 22 July ===
List of shipwrecks: 22 July 1919
Ship	State	Description
Charles E. Dunlap	United States	During a voyage from San Juan, Puerto Rico, to New York City with a cargo of coconuts, the 1,498-gross register ton four-masted schooner ran aground in dense fog on Rockaway Shoal off East Rockaway Inlet on the coast of Long Island, New York, while trying to enter New York Harbor. She broke up and sank in 25 feet (8 m) of water. Her wreck is known as the "Coconut Wreck."

=== 26 July ===
List of shipwrecks: 26 July 1919
Ship	State	Description
Hauruto	United Kingdom	The cargo ship departed Saigon, French Indochina for Hong Kong. No further trace, presumed foundered with the loss of all hands.

=== 27 July ===
List of shipwrecks: 27 July 1919
Ship	State	Description
Admiral Knight	United States	The cargo ship was destroyed by fire off the mouth of the Fraser River. Her crew were rescued.
USS May	United States Navy	The naval yacht ran aground off Cape Engaño, Dominican Republic. She was abandoned as a total loss on 28 February 1920.
Synovya	Russian Navy White Movement	Russian Civil War: The steamer was beached and burned to prevent capture in the Volga Estuary.
Yekaterina	Russian Navy White Movement	Russian Civil War: The steamer was beached and burned to prevent capture in the Volga Estuary.

=== 30 July ===
List of shipwrecks: 30 July 1919
Ship	State	Description
USS G-2	United States Navy	While moored in Twotree Island Channel in Niantic Bay off Waterford, Connecticut, undergoing inspection by a six-man team after being designated for use in weapons tests, the decommissioned G-class submarine suddenly flooded and sank in 81 feet (25 m) of water. Three members of the inspection team were killed. She was partially salvaged in 1962.
Toyo Maru No.2	Japan	The cargo ship was destroyed by fire.

== August ==
=== 1 August ===
List of shipwrecks: 1 August 1919
Ship	State	Description
No. 2	Soviet Navy	Russian Civil War: The gunboat was bombed and damaged by British seaplanes, then damaged further by White gunboats in Lake Onega and beached, abandoned. Retrieved by the Whites and put in service as Silny (Russian Navy) White Movement.
No. 3	Soviet Navy	Russian Civil War: The gunboat was bombed and damaged by British seaplanes or by White gunboats in Lake Onega and beached, abandoned.

=== 9 August ===
List of shipwrecks: 9 August 1919
Ship	State	Description
Quebec		Port Colborne explosion: The steam barge was damaged or destroyed when the Dominion Grain Elevator that she was tied up at exploded on the Welland Canal at Port Colborne, Ontario. She was beached to prevent sinking. Two or three bodies were found on board.
Traveler	United States	The motor yacht was beached near Watch Hill, Rhode Island, after hitting a reef.

=== 10 August ===
List of shipwrecks: 10 August 1919
Ship	State	Description
Wanick	United States	The 18-gross register ton, 48.9-foot (14.9 m) towing vessel became stranded and was lost without loss of life at Lost Harbor (54°13′45″N 165°36′30″W) in the Territory of Alaska.

=== 11 August ===
List of shipwrecks: 11 August 1919
Ship	State	Description
Archangel	Russian Navy White Movement	Russian Civil War: Allied Intervention in the Russian Civil War: The minesweeping tugboat was sunk by mines in the Dvina River. One British officer was killed.
David W. Mills	United States	The 202-foot (61.6 m) 925-gross register ton cargo ship, a "steambarge," ran hard aground in Ford Shoals in Lake Ontario, 4.5 nautical miles (8.3 km; 5.2 mi) west-southwest of Oswego, New York, in heavy fog caused by forest fires in Canada. Salvage attempts failed, and in October 1919 she broke up in a storm and sank in 12 to 25 feet (3.7 to 7.6 m) of water at 43°26′37.68″N 076°35′05.7012″W

=== 13 August ===
List of shipwrecks: 13 August 1919
Ship	State	Description
Basilicata	Regia Marina	The Campania-class protected cruiser was sunk at Tewfik, Egypt, by the explosion of one of her boilers. She was refloated in 1920 and later was scrapped.

=== 14 August ===
List of shipwrecks: 13 August 1919
Ship	State	Description
Ballew	United States	The yug was stranded on Hawes Shoal near Vineyard Haven, Massachusetts.
Lettie	United States	During a voyage in the Aleutian Islands from Atka to Unimak Island and Unalaska with a crew of four and a cargo of four tons off general merchandise and salted cod on board, the 27-gross register ton schooner was wrecked without loss of life in dense fog and strong tides on Samalga Reef off the southwestern end of Samalga Island in the Fox Islands subgroup of the eastern Aleutians.
Skorpion	Soviet Navy	Russian Civil War: Allied Intervention in the Russian Civil War: The patrol boat was shelled and sunk by artillery in the Dvina River.

=== 18 August ===
List of shipwrecks: 18 August 1919
Ship	State	Description
Andrei Pervozvanny	Soviet Navy	Russian Civil War, British campaign in the Baltic: Battle of Kronstadt: The Andrei Pervozvanny-class battleship was torpedoed by HM CMB-31 (Royal Navy) at Kronstadt and beached to prevent sinking. Never fully repaired and scrapped post civil war.
HM CMB-24	Royal Navy	Russian Civil War: British campaign in the Baltic: Battle of Kronstadt: The coastal motor boat was shelled and sunk by Gavril (Soviet Navy).
HM CMB-62	Royal Navy	Russian Civil War: British campaign in the Baltic: Battle of Kronstadt: The coastal motor boat was shelled and sunk by Gavril (Soviet Navy) after possibly being in a collision with HM CMB-62 (Royal Navy).
HM CMB-67	Royal Navy	Russian Civil War: The coastal motor boat sank in a storm.
HM CMB-79	Royal Navy	Russian Civil War: British campaign in the Baltic: Battle of Kronstadt: The coastal motor boat was sunk during the battle, either by Russian shelling, being capsized by a wave/wake, or in a collision with HM CMB-62 (Royal Navy).
Pamiat Azova	Soviet Navy	Pamiat Azova Russian Civil War, British campaign in the Baltic: Battle of Kronstadt: The depot ship was torpedoed and sunk by HM CMB-79 (Royal Navy) at Kronstadt.

=== 19 August ===
List of shipwrecks: 19 August 1919
Ship	State	Description
Frip	Sweden	The wooden schooner, en route from Karlskrona to West Hartlepool, sank after striking a mine from the minefields at Herthas Flak in Kattegat. One crew member was killed.

=== 23 August ===
List of shipwrecks: 23 August 1919
Ship	State	Description
Constance	United States	The 78-gross register ton fishing vessel was wrecked without loss of life on the south-central coast of the Territory of Alaska 25 nautical miles (46 km; 29 mi) east of Cape Suckling (59°59′30″N 143°30′00″W). The schooner Northland (United States) rescued her crew of 15 from the beach.
Rustler	United States	The steamer burned and sank in the Rouge River.

=== 25 August ===
List of shipwrecks: 25 August 1919
Ship	State	Description
Malroe	United States	While out of service and hauled out on the bank of the Snake River near Nome, Territory of Alaska, about 0.5-mile (0.8 km) from the river′s mouth, the 12-gross register ton schooner was destroyed by fire.

=== 30 August ===
List of shipwrecks: 30 August 1919
Ship	State	Description
Sculpin II	United States	The schooner yacht was blown ashore at Groton, Connecticut.

=== Unknown date ===
List of shipwrecks: unknown August 1919
Ship	State	Description
Cyrano	United Kingdom	The 117-foot (36 m), 214-ton steam trawler left Grimsby to fish in the North Sea on 13 August and vanished. Lost with all 11 crew.
Kuryer	Soviet Navy Red Movement	Russian Civil War: The paddle steamer gunboat was scuttled on the Dnieper River to prevent capture in late August.

== September ==
=== 1 September ===
List of shipwrecks: 1 September 1919
Ship	State	Description
Edward J. McKeever Jr.	United States	The fishing steamer went ashore on Sea Flower Reef near Fishers Island, New York.
HMS Vittoria	Royal Navy	Russian Civil War, British campaign in the Baltic: The V-class destroyer was torpedoed and sunk by Pantera (Soviet Navy) in the Gulf of Finland off Seiskari, Finland. She was salvaged in 1925 but found to be beyond repair.

=== 4 September ===
List of shipwrecks: 4 September 1919
Ship	State	Description
Nemassa	United States	The steamer sank in the channel at Baltimore on its first cargo run. Raised, repaired and returned to service.
HMS Verulam	Royal Navy	Russian Civil War, British campaign in the Baltic: The V-class destroyer struck a mine and sank off in the Gulf of Finland off Seiskari, Finland. She was salvaged in 1925 but found to be beyond repair.

=== 5 September ===
List of shipwrecks: 5 September 1919
Ship	State	Description
Leviathan	United States	The steam lighter was stranded on the bank of the Cape Cod Canal near Bourne Bridge, Massachusetts.

=== 8 September ===
List of shipwrecks: 8 September 1919
Ship	State	Description
Arag	Russian Navy White Movement	Russian Civil War: The gunboat was sunk off Lagan Island by mines. Four crewmen killed.
Casco	United States	The 93-ton schooner was wrecked on the southeast coast of King Island in the Bering Sea during a gale. Her wreck sank in 12 feet (3.7 m) of water on 10 September and broke up completely in a gale on 23 September.
Valbanera	Spain	1919 Florida Keys hurricane: The passenger ship foundered 40 miles (64 km) west of Key West, Florida in 30 feet (9.1 m) of water on Half Moon Shoal with the loss of all 488 passengers and crew.

=== 9 September ===
List of shipwrecks: 9 September 1919
Ship	State	Description
Comal	United States	1919 Florida Keys hurricane: The ship broke loose in the Harbor at Key West and grounded.
Corydon	United States	1919 Florida Keys hurricane: The cargo ship sank in the Bahama Channel during a hurricane. 27 killed.
E. V. Drew	United States	1919 Florida Keys hurricane: The schooner sank in the harbor at Key West.
Grampus	United States	1919 Florida Keys hurricane: The dredge sank in the harbor at Key West.
USS St. Sebastian	United States Navy	1919 Florida Keys hurricane: The 50-foot (15 m) patrol vessel was anchored in the North Beach Basin at Key West, Florida. She was pushed against the wall of the basin and beaten to pieces.
USS Sylvia	United States Navy	1919 Florida Keys hurricane: The 48-foot (15 m) patrol vessel was anchored in the North Beach Basin at Key West, Florida. She was pushed against the wall of the basin and beaten to pieces.
Tonawanda	United Kingdom	1919 Florida Keys hurricane: The tanker was scuttled in the harbor at Key West to prevent destruction.
USS Traveler	United States Navy	1919 Florida Keys hurricane: The 50-foot (15 m) patrol vessel was destroyed at Key West, Florida.

=== 10 September ===
List of shipwrecks: 10 September 1919
Ship	State	Description
USS Coco	United States Navy	1919 Florida Keys hurricane: The 36-foot (11 m) patrol vessel foundered off Key West, Florida in a hurricane.
USS Katherine K.	United States Navy	1919 Florida Keys hurricane: The harbor tug/patrol vessel foundered/wrecked/destroyed off Key West, Florida in a hurricane.
USS Mary Pope	United States Navy	1919 Florida Keys hurricane: The 52-foot (16 m) patrol vessel was destroyed at Key West, Florida in a hurricane.
USS Patrol No. 1	United States Navy	1919 Florida Keys hurricane: The 40-foot (12 m) patrol vessel was wrecked at Key West, Florida in a hurricane.
USS Sea Hawk	United States Navy	1919 Florida Keys hurricane: The patrol vessel disappeared from Key West, Florida during the hurricane.

=== 11 September ===
List of shipwrecks: 11 September 1919
Ship	State	Description
USS Helena I	United States Navy	1919 Florida Keys hurricane: The naval yacht/patrol vessel was wrecked at Key West, Florida in a hurricane.

=== 16 September ===
List of shipwrecks: 16 September 1919
Ship	State	Description
Belvedere	United States	Trapped in ice since 15 September in the Chukchi Sea 12 nautical miles (22 km; 14 mi) northeast of "Cape Jinretlen" – presumably a reference to Cape Dzhenretlen (67°06′48″N 173°39′00″W) – on the coast of Siberia, the 523-gross register ton steam whaling bark sank four hours after her three passengers and crew of 30 abandoned her the following morning. All on board survived.
HMS M25	Royal Navy	Russian Civil War, North Russia Intervention: The M15-class monitor ran aground in the Dvina River in Russia after the river level fell and was scuttled.
HMS M27	Royal Navy	Russian Civil War, North Russia Intervention: The M15-class monitor ran aground in the Dvina River in Russia after the river level fell and was scuttled.
West Arvada	United States	The cargo ship was sunk by a mine 16 miles (26 km) north of Terschelling.

=== 21 September ===
List of shipwrecks: 21 September 1919
Ship	State	Description
North Fork	United States	The steam schooner was wrecked in fog between Point Arena and Shelter Cove. Her cargo was salvaged.

=== 23 September ===
List of shipwrecks: 23 September 1919
Ship	State	Description
Belogor	Soviet Navy	Russian Civil War: Allied Intervention in the Russian Civil War: The minesweeper was mined and sunk in the Dvina River.

=== 24 September ===
List of shipwrecks: 24 September 1919
Ship	State	Description
Posylnyy	Soviet Navy	Russian Civil War: Allied Intervention in the Russian Civil War: The minesweeper was mined and sunk in the Dvina River.
Vdachayy	Soviet Navy	Russian Civil War: Allied Intervention in the Russian Civil War: The minesweeper was mined and sunk in the Dvina River.

=== 25 September ===
List of shipwrecks: 25 September 1919
Ship	State	Description
Marie	United States	The 43-gross register ton, 63-foot (19.2 m) fishing vessel was destroyed by fire at Sister Island (54°52′15″N 131°17′15″W) in Southeast Alaska. Her entire crew of six survived.

=== 29 September ===
List of shipwrecks: 29 September 1919
Ship	State	Description
ML-18	Royal Navy	The motor launch presumably was lost in the North Sea while on passage to the United Kingdom from Norway.
ML-62	Royal Navy	The motor launch presumably was lost in the North Sea while on passage to the United Kingdom from Norway.
ML-191	Royal Navy	The motor launch presumably was lost in the North Sea while on passage to the United Kingdom from Norway.
Ossifrage	Canada	The barge struck a shoal and foundered in Northumberland Strait while being towed from Wallace, Nova Scotia, Canada, to Souris, Prince Edward Island, Canada.

=== 30 September ===
List of shipwrecks: 30 September 1919
Ship	State	Description
August Helmerich	Germany	The cargo ship was on a voyage from Kotka, Finland. to Hamburg, Germany, when she sank in the Baltic Sea after a collision with the Normandiet (Denmark) off Dalarö, Sweden, on the east coast of Öland.

== October ==
=== 1 October ===
List of shipwrecks: 1 October 1919
Ship	State	Description
Homer	United States	The 34-gross register ton motor vessel was destroyed in Security Bay (56°53′N 134°21′W) in Southeast Alaska by a fire that started in her engine room. All three crew members transferred to the motor vessel Milleville (United States), which was lying alongside when the fire broke out, and survived.

=== 2 October ===
List of shipwrecks: 2 October 1919
Ship	State	Description
Dobrovolets	Russian Navy White Movement	Russian Civil War: Battle of Pechek: The gunboat ran aground during the battle on the Dnieper River. She was then shelled and machine gunned by Geroyskiy (Soviet Navy) causing her crew to abandon ship. The ship was captured, and refloated a few hours later. Repaired and put in service as Gubitelnyy (Soviet Navy).

=== 3 October ===
List of shipwrecks: 3 October 1919
Ship	State	Description
Frank O'Connor	United States	The bulk carrier caught fire and sank in Lake Michigan.
Ljusne Alf	Germany	The cargo vessel was sunk, possibly by a naval mine.
Sesnon #15	United States	With a crew of six and a cargo of 25 tons of general merchandise aboard, the 40-ton scow was wrecked without loss of life in Golovnin Bay on the coast of the Territory of Alaska during a gale.

=== 4 October ===
List of shipwrecks: 4 October 1919
Ship	State	Description
Mackensen	Imperial German Navy	The Mackensen-class Vorpostenboot was sunk by mines on the Dogger Bank.

=== 5 October ===
List of shipwrecks: 5 October 1919
Ship	State	Description
Milton	United States	The cargo ship caught fire and sank near Lisboain.
Nadezhda	Russian Navy White Movement	Russian Civil War: The gunboat was sunk off Lagan Island by mines.

=== 7 October ===
List of shipwrecks: 7 October 1919
Ship	State	Description
Sizergh Castle	United Kingdom	The cargo ship foundered due to a water leakage in the North Atlantic while she was travelling from Galveston, Texas, United States to Antwerp, Belgium.

=== 8 October ===
List of shipwrecks: 8 October 1919
Ship	State	Description
Hettie B	United States	During a voyage from the Lost River to Nome, Territory of Alaska, the 15-gross register ton motor vessel was wrecked without loss of life during a gale on a shoal approximately 0.5 nautical miles (0.9 km; 0.6 mi) southeast of the mouth of Safety Lagoon (64°29′N 164°45′W) on Alaska′s Norton Sound coast. A motorboat from shore rescued her seven passengers and crew of three. Her gasoline engine later was salvaged, after which her wreck was abandoned in place.
Sesnon #4	United States	While anchored off Nome, Territory of Alaska, with no cargo or crew aboard, the 23-ton barge broke loose from her moorings during a gale, was driven ashore, and was broken apart by waves.
Sesnon #10	United States	With no cargo or crew aboard, the 20-ton barge broke loose from her moorings at Nome, Territory of Alaska, during a gale, was driven ashore on a beach about 2 nautical miles (3.7 km; 2.3 mi) east of Nome, and was broken apart by waves.

=== 9 October ===
List of shipwrecks: 9 October 1919
Ship	State	Description
Daram	United States	The cargo ship ran aground and sank on Long Bar Reef off Bermuda during a voyage from Pensacola, Florida, United States, to Marseille, France.
Flyer	United States	With no one and no cargo aboard, the 6-ton scow was blown from her moorings at the mouth of the Kiwalik River on the coast of the Territory of Alaska and onto the shore, where ice and the surf broke her up. She was declared a total loss.

=== 17 October ===
List of shipwrecks: 17 October 1919
Ship	State	Description
SMS Kaiser Franz Joseph I	Austro-Hungarian Navy	Awarded to France as a war reparation in the aftermath of World War I and overloaded with dismantled machinery, the protected cruiser foundered in a gale in Cattaro Bay off Kumbor on the coast of the Kingdom of Serbs, Croats, and Slovenes during her delivery voyage.

=== 18 October ===
List of shipwrecks: 18 October 1919
Ship	State	Description
HMS H41	Royal Navy	The H-class submarine sank after a collision with HMS Vulcan (Royal Navy) in the North Sea off Blyth, Northumberland.

=== 19 October ===
List of shipwrecks: 19 October 1919
Ship	State	Description
Constanza	Sweden	The cargo ship, en route from Bougie to Gothenburg, Sweden, sank after striking a mine in Kattegat. Two crew members were killed.
Katherine Howard	United States	The barge grounded on the flats in the harbor at Plymouth, Massachusetts.

=== 20 October ===
List of shipwrecks: 20 October 1919
Ship	State	Description
Gavriil	Soviet Navy	Russian Civil War: British campaign in the Baltic: The Orfey-class destroyer was sunk by mines in Koporsky Bay in the Gulf of Finland.
Hollandia	Sweden	The combined cargo and passenger ship, en route from Gothenburg to Antwerp, sank after striking a mine in the North Sea. Only four crew survived. The master and seventeen crew, and two passengers, perished.
Konstantin	Soviet Navy	Russian Civil War: British campaign in the Baltic: The Orfey-class destroyer was sunk by mines in Koporsky Bay in the Gulf of Finland.
Svoboda	Soviet Navy	Russian Civil War: British campaign in the Baltic: The Orfey-class destroyer was sunk by mines in Koporsky Bay in the Gulf of Finland.

=== 22 October ===
List of shipwrecks: 22 October 1919
Ship	State	Description
USS Tecumseh	United States Navy	The tug sank at the Washington Navy Yard wharf in Washington, D. C. The vessel was raised, repaired and returned to service.

=== 24 October ===
List of shipwrecks: 24 October 1919
Ship	State	Description
R01	Royal Navy	The Schastlivy-class destroyer foundered in a storm off Mudros, Greece whilst being towed from İzmit, Ottoman Empire to Malta by HMS Torch (Royal Navy).

=== 28 October ===
List of shipwrecks: 28 October 1919
Ship	State	Description
Muskegon	United States	The passenger ship was wrecked on the south pier of the harbor at Muskegon, Michigan in a gale and heavy seas, a total loss. 23 killed.

=== 29 October ===
List of shipwrecks: 29 October 1919
Ship	State	Description
Frej	Sweden	The wooden schooner, en route from Åbo to Malmö, sank after striking a mine in the Baltic, west of Gotland. The crew survived.

=== 31 October ===
List of shipwrecks: 31 October 1919
Ship	State	Description
Fazilka	United Kingdom	The cargo liner was wrecked on Great Nicobar Island, India.

=== Unknown date ===
List of shipwrecks: Unknown date in October 1919
Ship	State	Description
Guimba	United States	The Design 1015 ship struck a mine at the mouth of the Elbe and was damaged. Subsequently repaired then laid up.

== November ==
=== 1 November ===
List of shipwrecks: 1 November 1919
Ship	State	Description
USS SC-256	United States Navy	The SC-1-class submarine chaser was sunk by a gasoline explosion in an unknown location.
Steamaxe	United Kingdom	The 141-foot (43 m) steam trawler was wrecked on rocks off Inchkeith Island in the Firth of Forth. Salvaged and cut up in 1921.
Volturnus	United Kingdom	The coastal cargo ship was sunk in the Kattegat five miles (8.0 km) southeast of the Skaw light vessel by mines.

=== 4 November ===
List of shipwrecks: 4 November 1919
Ship	State	Description
Lesbos	Belgium	The cargo ship ran aground on Cross Sands, in the North Sea off Great Yarmouth, Norfolk, United Kingdom and was wrecked.

=== 5 November ===
List of shipwrecks: 5 November 1919
Ship	State	Description
Audrey P. Brown	Canada	The schooner ran aground in Liverpool Bay, Nova Scotia.
Silny	Russian Navy White Movement	Russian Civil War: Medvezhyegorsk Operation: The gunboat was scuttled to prevent capture in Lake Onega.

=== 7 November ===
List of shipwrecks: 7 November 1919
Ship	State	Description
No. 7	Soviet Navy	Russian Civil War: Medvezhyegorsk Operation: The gunboat was shelled and damaged by White artillery in Lake Onega and beached, scuttled by retiring Soviet troops to prevent capture.

=== 9 November ===
List of shipwrecks: 5 November 1919
Ship	State	Description
Polar Land	United States	On 7 or 9 November, the cargo ship sank in the Atlantic Ocean east of Halifax, Nova Scotia at (44°25′N 57°50′W). Lost with all 51 crew.

=== 11 November ===
List of shipwrecks: 5 November 1919
Ship	State	Description
John Owen	United States	The steamer sank between Duluth, Minnesota and Midland, Ontario. Lost with all 22 crew.

=== 13 November ===
List of shipwrecks: 14 November 1919
Ship	State	Description
Council Bluffs	United States	The cargo ship was sunk by a mine in the Irish Sea.

=== 14 November ===
List of shipwrecks: 14 November 1919
Ship	State	Description
No. 4	Soviet Navy Red Movement	Russian Civil War: The armed pontoon had to be beached to prevent sinking in the Volga Estuary after a torpedo launched from a White Navy coastal motor boat exploded on the river bottom beneath it.

=== 18 November ===
List of shipwrecks: 18 November 1919
Ship	State	Description
Algoma	United States	While under tow along with two dump scows by the tug Arctic (United States) in Lake Michigan, the non-self-propelled wooden steam dredge was swamped by heavy seas off Cleveland, Wisconsin. After Arctic rescued her crew of five and cut her loose, Algoma sank in 85 feet (26 m) of water at 43°53.518′N 087°40.301′W. The wreck lies within the Wisconsin Shipwreck Coast National Marine Sanctuary, and also is referred to as the "McMullen & Pitz Dredge."

=== 20 November ===
List of shipwrecks: 20 November 1919
Ship	State	Description
Atle Jarl	Weimar Republic	The cargo ship sank after hitting a mine near Öland, Sweden while she was on a voyage from Luleå, Sweden to Amsterdam, the Netherlands with a cargo of wood. She was refloated on 28 June 1920 and repaired.

=== 22 November ===
List of shipwrecks: 22 November 1919
Ship	State	Description
Ady	Belgium	The schooner, carrying a cargo of copra, caught fire off Jamaica and was abandoned.
Myron	United States	The lumber hooker foundered in Lake Superior off Whitefish Point with the loss of 17 of her 18 crew. Only the captain survived.

=== 24 November ===
List of shipwrecks: 24 November 1919
Ship	State	Description
Poltava	Soviet Navy	The Gangut-class battleship was severely damaged by fire at Petrograd. She was not repaired.

=== Unknown date ===
List of shipwrecks: unknown date in November 1919
Ship	State	Description
Bolinder K-5	Russian Navy White Movement	Russian Civil War: Battle of Kiev: The armed barge sank while firing on Red troops, possibly the recoil from her guns opened up her seams.

== December ==
=== 1 December ===
List of shipwrecks: 1 December 1919
Ship	State	Description
Kerwood	United States	The cargo ship was sunk by a mine 20 miles (32 km) northwest of Terschelling or in the Irish Sea.

=== 5 December ===
List of shipwrecks: 5 December 1919
Ship	State	Description
C-1	Finnish Navy	Russian Civil War: The torpedo boat was crushed by ice and sank between Koivisto and Helsinki.
C-2	Finnish Navy	Russian Civil War: The torpedo boat was crushed by ice and sank between Koivisto and Helsinki.
C-3	Finnish Navy	Russian Civil War: The torpedo boat was crushed by ice and sank between Koivisto and Helsinki.
Frigga	Sweden	The wooden barque, en route from North Shields, sank after striking a mine in Kattegat. The master and seven crew died, only two of the crew survived.
Liberty Glo	United States	The cargo ship struck a mine and was almost blown in half off the coast of the Netherlands. She was held together by her deck plates. She was beached near the Ameland Light. She was refloated four months later and taken to Rotterdam where she was repaired with a new bow sent from her builders.

=== 8 December ===
List of shipwrecks: 8 December 1919
Ship	State	Description
Acushla	United States	The 24-gross register ton, 44-foot (13.4 m) fishing vessel was destroyed by fire in Peans Hole (55°13′N 133°32′W) in Bucareli Bay in the Alexander Archipelago in Southeast Alaska. All six people on board survived.

=== 9 December ===
List of shipwrecks: 11 December 1919
Ship	State	Description
Ethie	Canada	She was on passage Battle Harbour, Labrador for Cow Head, Newfoundland with codfish and herring, was lost at Martin's Point, 16 nautical miles (30 km) north of Bonne Bay, Newfoundland

=== 11 December ===
List of shipwrecks: 11 December 1919
Ship	State	Description
C. J. Hooper	United States	The tug was severely damaged by fire at Baltimore, Maryland.
Dreamland	United States	The ship was damaged by fire at Baltimore.
Gretchen	United States	The bugeye was severely damaged by fire at Baltimore.
Governor R. M. McLane	United States	The Maryland State Fishery Force vessel was severely damaged by fire at Baltimore. Subsequently repaired and returned to service.
Lake Duvall	United States	The steamship was damaged by fire at Baltimore.
Major L'Enfant	United States Army	The U.S. Army Quartermaster steamship was destroyed by fire at Baltimore with the loss of a crew member.
Nupolela	United States	The steamship was damaged by fire at Baltimore.
Wilhelm Jebsen	United States	The ship was damaged by fire at Baltimore.

=== 12 December ===
List of shipwrecks: 12 December 1919
Ship	State	Description
Kerwood	United States	The cargo ship struck a mine and sank in the North Sea 20 nautical miles (37 km) north of Terschelling, Netherlands.

=== 18 December ===
List of shipwrecks: 18 December 1919
Ship	State	Description
Cufic	United Kingdom	The cargo ship foundered with the loss of all 40 crew.
J. A. Chanslor	United States	The steamer struck rocks off Cape Blanco, Oregon, she broke in two and sank. 38 killed.

=== 20 December ===
List of shipwrecks: 20 December 1919
Ship	State	Description
May	United States	After losing steering, the 11-gross register ton motor vessel was forced ashore by wind and tide and wrecked on the coast of Prince of Wales Island in the Alexander Archipelago in Southeast Alaska, 2 nautical miles (3.7 km; 2.3 mi) south of Narrow Point (55°47′30″N 132°28′30″W). The only person aboard survived.

=== 25 December ===
List of shipwrecks: 25 December 1919
Ship	State	Description
Dundee	Canada	On a voyage from Lewesport to Port Union, Newfoundland, the vessel was stranded and lost on Noggin Island (Grassy Island), Sir Charles Hamilton Sound near Carmanville, Newfoundland.

=== 26 December ===
List of shipwrecks: 26 December 1919
Ship	State	Description
Eleanor A. Percy	Norway	The six-masted Schooner spang a leak in a storm and sank 350 nautical miles (650 km; 400 mi) off the Irish coast while on a voyage from Rio de Janeiro, Brazil to Copenhagen, Denmark, with the loss of 12 crew. The 5 survivors were rescued by the Swansea trawler Walwyn Castle on 29 December.

=== Unknown date ===
List of shipwrecks: unknown date December 1919
Ship	State	Description
Harburg	Imperial German Navy	The Admiral Scheer-class Vorpostenboot was lost to unknown causes after 2 December in the North Sea.
USS R-6	United States Navy	The R-class submarine was swept from her moorings in a gale and went aground on Black Rock at the entrance to the harbor at New London, Connecticut. She was later refloated, repaired and returned to service.

== Unknown date ==
List of shipwrecks: Unknown date 1919
Ship	State	Description
Alpha	United States	While anchored with no one aboard, the 9-gross register ton motor vessel sank off the point north of the Alaska Seafood Cannery of Cordova, Territory of Alaska, in the spring of 1919.
Challenge	United States	The 39-gross register ton motor vessel filled with water and sank in Bernard Harbour (57.9103°N 152.5086°W) on the coast of the Northwest Territories, Canada in early 1919 after her bottom froze to the bottom of the harbour while she was laid up over the winter of 1918–1919. After she sank, ice broke her up.
SMS Don Juan d'Austria	Austro-Hungarian Navy	The barracks ship, a former central battery ironclad, sank.
Elbrus	Soviet Navy	Raised after having been scuttled at Novorossisk in 1914, then scuttled again to prevent capture. Raised again in 1925, repaired, and returned to service.
Frida Horn	Germany	The cargo vessel was sunk by a naval mine sometime in 1919. Raised, repaired and returned to service.
Lyman D. Foster	New Zealand	The barquentine was last seen leaving Nukuʻalofa, Tonga on 26 March 1919 bound for San Francisco, with cargo of copra. She was posted as missing on 29 October 1919.
San Juan #1	United States	The scow barge was lost in the Gulf of Alaska sometime in 1919. Her loss was not reported until 1928.
Shirley	United States	The 1,049-ton barge – a converted bark – was abandoned at Skagway, Alaska Territory.
UB-14	ex-Imperial German Navy	The Type UB I submarine was scuttled in the Black Sea off Sevastopol, Russia in the early months of 1919.
