= H41 =

H41 may refer to:

- Brazilian ship Almirante Camara (H41), an oceanographic research vessel
- Cessna H-41 Seneca, an American helicopter
- Federal Reserve Statistical Release H.4.1
- Hanriot H.41, a French military trainer aircraft
- HMS Ardent (H41), a Royal Navy A-class destroyer
- HMS H41, a Royal Navy H-class submarine
- HMS Redoubt (H41), a Royal Navy R-class destroyer
