= Daram =

Daram may refer to:

- Daram, Mazandaran, Iran (درام - Darām)
- Daram, Zanjan, Iran (درم - Daram)
- Daram, Samar, Philippines
- SS Daram, an American cargo ship that ran aground on Long Bar Reef, Bermuda

== See also ==
- Daram Rud, Kurdistan, a village in Sursur Rural District, Muchesh District, Kamyaran County, Kurdistan Province, Iran
