= Charles Briggs (Royal Navy officer) =

Royal Navy Admiral (1858–1951)

Admiral Sir Charles Briggs KCB
- Born: 15 July 1858; Brentford, Essex, England
- Died: 16 July 1951 (aged 93); Chippenham, Wiltshire, England
- Burial place: Biddestone, Wiltshire, England
- Military career
- Allegiance: United Kingdom
- Branch: Royal Navy
- Rank: Admiral
- Commands: HMS Vulcan
- Conflicts: World War I
- Awards: Knight Commander of the Order of the Bath

Admiral Sir Charles John Briggs KCB (15 July 1858 – 16 July 1951) was a Royal Navy officer who went on to be Third Sea Lord and Controller of the Navy.

== Naval career ==
Briggs joined the Royal Navy as a cadet in 1872. He was promoted to the rank of Captain on 22 June 1897, and appointed in command of the torpedo boat depot ship HMS Vulcan on 12 December 1901.

He was appointed Rear Admiral in the First Division of the Home Fleet in 1909 before becoming Third Sea Lord and Controller of the Navy in 1910 and then being given command of the 4th Battle Squadron in the Home Fleet in 1913. He retired in 1917.

== Family ==
In 1901 he married Frances Mary Wilson; they had three sons and three daughters.

Military offices
Preceded by Sir John Jellicoe	Third Sea Lord and Controller of the Navy; 1910–1912	Succeeded by Sir Gordon Moore
