= Frank Ragan King =

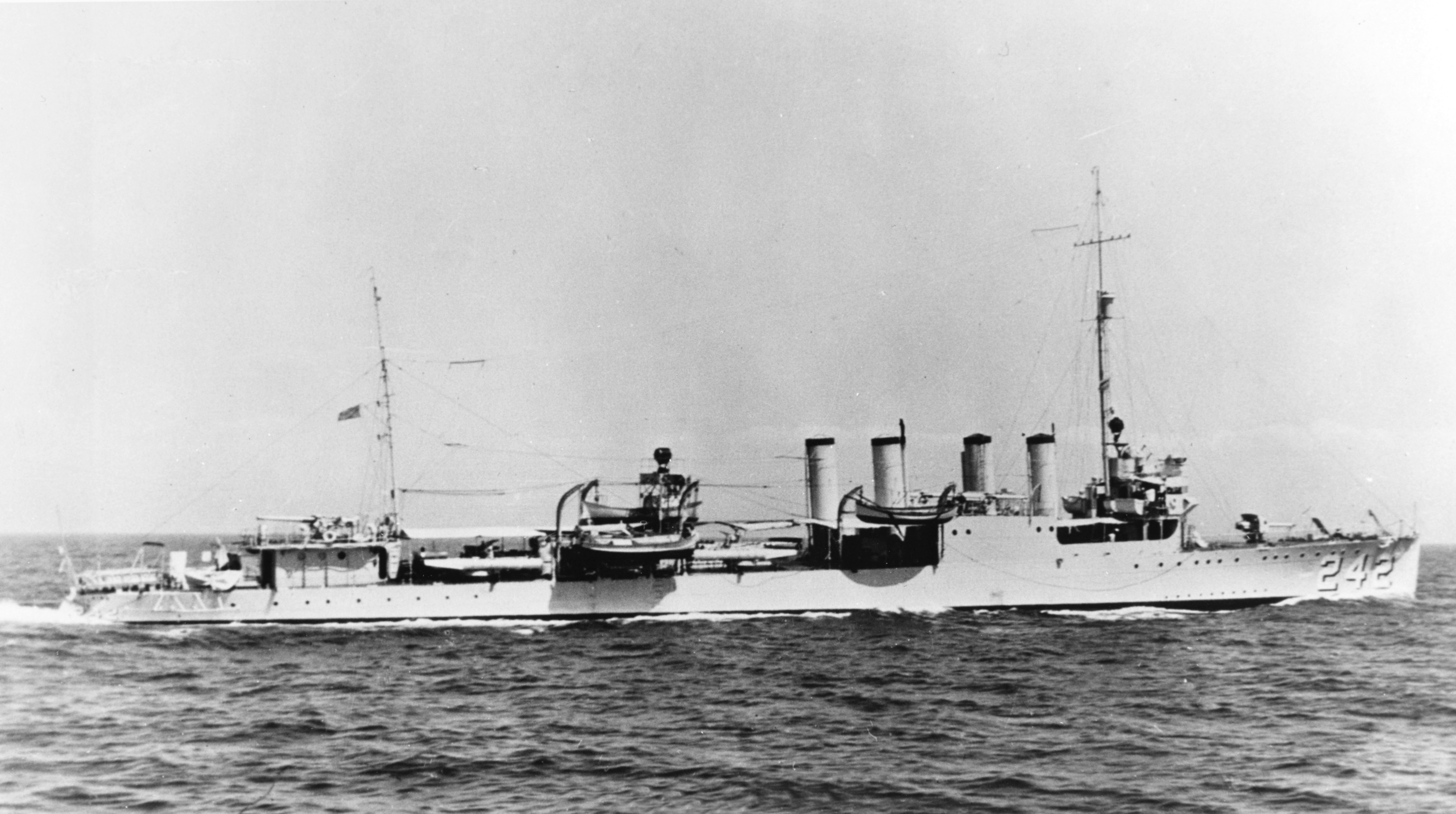
- Frank Ragan King's namesake, the USS King
- Born: October 15, 1884; Montevallo, Alabama, U.S.
- Died: July 12, 1919 (aged 34); North Sea
- Military career
- Allegiance: United States of America
- Branch: United States Navy
- Service years: 1903–1919
- Rank: Midshipman - May 6, 1903 Ensign - February 12, 1909 Commander - September 21, 1918
- Commands: USS Richard Bulkeley (1917)
- Conflicts: World War I
- Awards: Navy Distinguished Service Medal

Commander Frank Ragan King (October 15, 1884 – July 12, 1919) was an officer in the United States Navy who died while conducting minesweeping operations shortly after World War I.

== Biography ==
Born in Montevallo, Alabama, King was appointed midshipman at the Naval Academy 6 May 1903 and graduated February 11, 1907. After serving as a passed midshipman, he was commissioned Ensign February 12, 1909.

King served in Arkansas, USS Hartford, Milwaukee, Pennsylvania, and Illinois before attaining the rank of Commander September 21, 1918.

Comdr. King assumed command of the trawler USS Richard Bulkeley July 7, 1919, during minesweeping operations in the North Sea. On July 12, 1919, his ship struck a mine and went down in only seven minutes.

During the crisis, King exerted himself to see that all of his crew might be saved. King's feeling for his men was evidenced by the fact that his final act before going down with his ship was to strap his own life preserver to a stunned sailor and help him over the side. Comdr. King received the Distinguished Service Medal for his valor.

== USS Richard Buckley ==
Commander Frank Ragan King assumed command of the trawler Richard Buckley July 7, 1919 during minesweeping operations in the North Sea. On July 12, 1919, his ship struck a mine and went down in only seven minutes. During the crisis, King exerted himself to see that all of his crew might be saved. King's feeling for his men was evidenced by the fact that his final act before going down with his ship was to strap his own life preserver to a stunned sailor and help him over the side. Commander King received the Distinguished Service Medal for his valor.

For exceptional meritorious service in a duty of great responsibility as commander of a division of trawlers, engaged in the difficult and hazardous operation of sweeping for and removing mines in the North Sea Barrage; and especially for his heroic conduct on the occasion of the destruction by mine explosion of his flagship, the Richard Bulkeley, of which he was also the commanding officer. Although stunned by the explosion, he made every effort to save the lives of and to rescue men entrapped by steam in the fire-room. The rapid sinking of the vessel prevented his success in the undertaking. Finding the ship about to sink, he proceeded to the bridge, where he took his station, and went down with the ship.

— Citation for the Navy Distinguished Service Medal awarded posthumously to Comdr. Frank Ragan King, USN

== Namesake ==
The destroyer USS King (DD-242) was named for him.

== Bibliography ==
Notes

References

- Stringer, Harry R. (1921). The Navy Book of Distinguished Service. Fassett Publishing Company. - Total pages: 249
