= USS Richard Bulkeley =

Minesweeper of the United States Navy

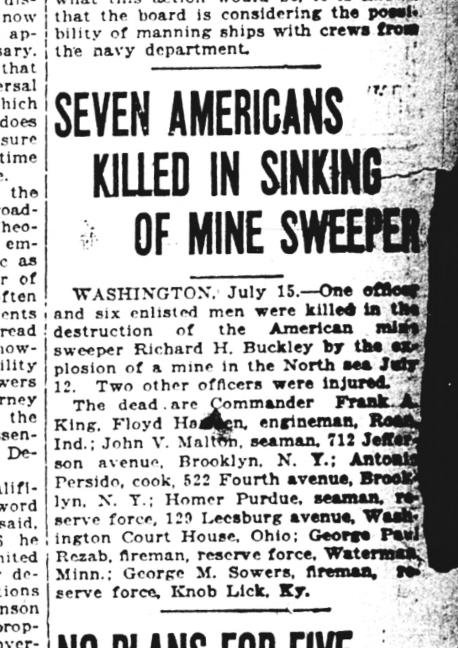
- Newspaper article about the sinking of the USS Richard Bulkeley - 16 July 1919

History

United Kingdom
- Name: HMT Richard Bulkeley
- Builder: Cochrane & Sons, Selby
- Yard number: 820
- Launched: 21 August 1917
- Completed: 16 November 1917
- Fate: 31 May 1919 loaned to United States Navy

United States
- Name: USS Richard Bulkeley
- Acquired: 31 May 1919
- Fate: Sunk by mine on 12 July1919
- Notes: Armed with 12-pounder AA gun

General characteristics
- Class & type: Mersey-class naval trawler
- Tonnage: 324 GRT
- Displacement: 438 tons
- Length: 138.5 ft (42.2 m)
- Beam: 23.7 ft (7.2 m)
- Depth: 12.8 ft (3.9 m)
- Decks: 1
- Propulsion: 600 ihp (450 kW) triple expansion steam engine by C. D. Holmes & Co. Ltd.
- Speed: 11 knots (20 km/h; 13 mph)
- Crew: 18

USS Richard Bulkeley was a minesweeping naval trawler leased from the British Royal Navy. Built as HMT Richard Bulkeley, the ship was a Mersey-class trawler, purpose-built for service with the Auxiliary Patrol. On 12 July 1919, the vessel was sunk by a naval mine while removing minefields in the North Sea.

== Design and construction ==
The early years of the First World War saw the Royal Navy acquire very large numbers of trawlers and drifters for use as minesweepers and patrol boats for the Auxiliary Patrol. By 1916, however, more fishing vessels could not be taken up from trade without causing the commercial fishing fleet to shrink to an unacceptably small size, so the British Admiralty commenced a construction programme of trawlers to meet the navy's needs. Three types of trawler were chosen for mass production, based on successful designs of commercial trawler, with very large numbers (550 were ordered by 1918). One of these types was the Mersey-class, based on Cochrane & Sons' prototype Lord Mersey.

The Mersey-class ships were 148 ft 0 in (45.11 m) long overall and 138 ft 6 in (42.21 m) between perpendiculars, with a beam) of 23 ft 9 in (7.24 m) and a draft of 12 ft 9 in (3.89 m). The ships had a Gross register tonnage of 324 tons, with a displacement of 438 long tons (445 t). They were propelled by a 600 ihp (450 kW) triple expansion steam engine, giving a speed of 11 knots (20 km/h; 13 mph).

Richard Bulkeley (Note: The names of the trawlers of the Mersey class, together with those of the Strath and Castle classes, were taken from the crew lists of the Ships of the line Victory and Royal Sovereign at the Battle of Trafalgar.) was ordered as Admiralty No. 3560 and built as Yard No. 820 at Cochrane & Sons' Selby shipyard, with a steam engine made by C. D. Holmes & Co. Ltd., Hull. It was launched on 21 August 1917 and completed on 16 November that year.

== Service ==
Richard Bulkeley was loaned to the US Navy on 31 May 1919 for use as a minesweeper.

== Sinking ==
Just before sunset on 12 July 1919, while minesweeping off the Orkney Islands, Richard Bulkeley was sunk by the explosion of a mine (said to be an American Mk VI mine) fouled in the “kite” (Type 7 plunger kite) of her sweep gear. USS George Clarke, a British-built Castle-class trawler, was able to retrieve twelve survivors from the icy waters. Seven others perished in the incident:

== Captain King ==
Commander Frank Ragan King assumed command of the trawler Richard Buckley on 7 July 1919 during minesweeping operations in the North Sea. On 12 July 1919 his ship struck a mine and went down in only seven minutes. During the crisis, King exerted himself to see that all of his crew might be saved. King's feeling for his men was evidenced by the fact that his final act before going down with his ship was to strap his own life preserver to a stunned sailor and help him over the side. Comdr. King received the Distinguished Service Medal for his valor. The destroyer USS King was named for him.

For exceptional meritorious service in a duty of great responsibility as commander of a division of trawlers, engaged in the difficult and hazardous operation of sweeping for and removing mines in the North Sea Barrage; and especially for his heroic conduct on the occasion of the destruction by mine explosion of his flagship, the Richard Bulkeley, of which he was also the commanding officer. Although stunned by the explosion, he made every effort to save the lives of and to rescue men entrapped by steam in the fire-room. The rapid sinking of the vessel prevented his success in the undertaking. Finding the ship about to sink, he proceeded to the bridge, where he took his station, and went down with the ship.

— Citation for the Navy Distinguished Service Medal awarded posthumously to Comdr. Frank Ragan King, USN
