= ML-18 (motor launch boat) =

History
- Name: ML-18
- Owner: Royal Navy
- Builder: Electric Launch Company
- Completed: 1915
- Maiden voyage: 1915
- In service: 1915
- Out of service: 29 September 1919
- Fate: Disappeared

General characteristics
- Type: Motor launch
- Tonnage: 37 disp
- Length: 34.1 metres (111 ft 11 in)
- Beam: 5.6 metres (18 ft 4 in)
- Depth: 1.2 metres (3 ft 11 in)
- Propulsion: Diesel engine
- Speed: 19 knots
- Armament: 1 x 3pdr plus depth charges

ML-18 was a British motor launch boat that disappeared in the North Sea while on passage from Norway.

== Construction ==
ML-18 was constructed in 1915 by the Electric Launch Company. She was completed in 1915 and served from 1915 until her loss in 1919.

The ship was 34.1 metres (111 ft 11 in) long, with a beam of 5.6 metres (18 ft 4 in) and a depth of 1.2 metres (3 ft 11 in). The ship was assessed at 37 disp with a diesel engine that could reach a speed of 19 knots.

== Disappearance ==
On 29 September 1919, ML-18 along with ML-62 and ML-191 were on passage from Norway when they disappeared in the North Sea. The crew and ships were never found; the number of casualties is unknown.
