= USS St. Sebastian =

Patrol vessel of the United States Navy

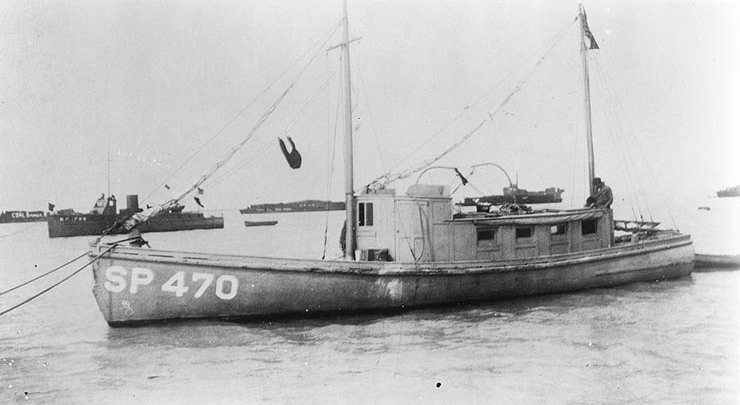
- USS St. Sebastian (SP-470) sometime between 1917 and 1919. The patrol boat USS War Bug (SP-1795) is in the left background.

History

United States
- Name: USS St. Sebastian
- Namesake: Previous name retained
- Builder: Captain R. D. Hardee, St. Sebastian, Florida
- Acquired: 25 June 1917
- Commissioned: 9 August 1917
- Stricken: 24 April 1919 or 4 October 1919
- Fate: Wrecked 9 September 1919
- Notes: Operated as private motorboat St. Sebastian until June 1917

General characteristics
- Type: Patrol vessel
- Length: 50 ft (15 m)
- Beam: 12 ft 4 in (3.76 m)
- Draft: 3 ft 6 in (1.07 m)
- Speed: 10 knots
- Complement: 6
- Armament: 1 × 1-pounder gun; 1 × machine gun

USS St. Sebastian (SP-470) was a United States Navy patrol vessel in commission from 1917 to 1919.

St. Sebastian was built as a private motorboat of the same name by Captain R. D. Hardee at St. Sebastian, Florida. On 25 June 1917, the U.S. Navy acquired her from her owner, J. W. Taylor of Marathon, Florida, for use as a section patrol vessel during World War I. She was commissioned as USS St. Sebastian (SP-470) on 9 August 1917.

St. Sebastian operated on patrol duty in Florida waters for the rest of World War I and into early 1919. She was out of commission and awaiting sale when she became one of several section patrol boats destroyed at Key West, Florida, on 9 September 1919 by the Florida Keys Hurricane.

Sources vary as to when St. Sebastian was stricken from the Navy List. It may have occurred on 24 April 1919 in advance of her being put up for sale or on 4 October 1919 after her destruction.
