= SS Sizergh Castle =

British cargo ship

History

United Kingdom
- Name: Sirocco (1903-1913); Sizergh Castle (1913-1919)
- Namesake: Sirocco; Sizergh Castle
- Owner: Bedouin Steam Navigation Co. (1903-1913); Lancashire Shipping Co. (1913-1919); The Ship Four Winds Co. (1919); Plisson Steam Navigation Co. (1919)
- Builder: William Pickersgill & Sons Ltd., Sunderland
- Yard number: 141
- Launched: 11 August 1903
- Completed: September 1903
- Home port: Liverpool (1903-1919); Cardiff (1919)
- Identification: UK Official Number 118047; Call sign VFQC
- Fate: Sank, 7 October 1919

General characteristics
- Type: Cargo ship
- Tonnage: 3,747 GRT; 2,349 NRT
- Length: 361 ft 0 in (110.03 m)
- Beam: 46 ft 2 in (14.07 m)
- Depth: 17 ft 6 in (5.33 m)
- Installed power: 349 Nhp
- Propulsion: G. Clark 3-cylinder triple expansion

SS Sizergh Castle was a British cargo ship that sprang a leak and foundered in the North Atlantic, while sailing from Galveston, Texas, United States to Antwerp, Belgium with a cargo of wheat.

== Construction ==
Sizergh Castle was constructed at the William Pickersgill & Sons Ltd. shipyard in Sunderland, England. She was completed in 1903.

The ship was 110 metres (360 ft 11 in) long, with a beam of 14.1 metres (46 ft 3 in) and a depth of 5.4 metres (17 ft 9 in), assessed at 3,783 GRT. She had a triple-expansion steam engine rated at 349 nhp driving a single screw propeller.

== Sinking ==
On 7 October 1919, Sizergh Castle was on a voyage from Galveston, Texas, United States, to Antwerp, Belgium, with a cargo of wheat when she sprang a leak and foundered in the North Atlantic (45°15′N 44°6′W). There were no casualties.
