= SS Council Bluffs =

American cargo ship (1918–1919)

History

United States
- Name: Council Bluffs
- Owner: United States Shipping Board
- Builder: Great Lakes Engineering Works
- Launched: 27 December 1918
- Out of service: 13 November 1919
- Fate: wrecked at Terschelling, the Netherland on 13 November 1919

General characteristics
- Type: Steamship
- Tonnage: 2450 BRT
- Length: 124 m (406 ft 10 in)
- Beam: 16 m (52 ft 6 in)
- Crew: 38

SS Council Bluffs was a 1918-built, 77.1 metres long American cargo steamship. It was built by Great Lakes Engineering Works and owned by United States Shipping Board. During the morning of 13 November 1919, the ship sank by a mine near Terschelling, the Netherlands. The wreck of the ship was found in 1993.

== Ship details ==
The steel cargo ship was built in 1918 or 1919 by Great Lakes Engineering Works and owned by United States Shipping Board of Detroit. She was 77.1 metres (252 ft 11 in) long and had a width of 13.3 m (43 ft 8 in). She had tonnage of 2450 GRT. She had a 1 x 3-cylinder triple expansion steam engine with a single shaft and 1 screw. She had a speed of 9.5 knots. She had yard number 213 and the Official number: 217512.

== History ==
On 16 October 1919 she departed from Philadelphia, United States to Rotterdam, the Netherlands. After arriving in Rotterdam, she departed on 12 November 1919 to Hamburg, Germany. From Hamburg she was scheduled to take cargo to the United States.

=== Fate ===
During the morning of 13 November 1919 at around 8am, she struck a mine near the Dutch coast. She broke into two pieces and sank. The 38 crew memberes were able to get into two lifeboats. After being for three hours in the lifeboats, they were found by Dutch minesweeper Hr.Ms. M1 that was actually in search for lifeboats of the sunken ship Zaan.

The crew members arrived at Nieuwediep at 6pm and were brought to several hotels.

== Wreck ==
In 1993 the wreck of the ship was found by divers of Terschelling. The two parts of the ship are lying 80 metres apart from each other. The bow was standing upright. Two anchors were still in the lockers that were secured on the forecastle with chain stoppers. The ship was broken behind the anchor lockers. A porthole is still visible. Very little remains of the stern. Recognizable were the rudder quadrant and the rudder stock that protrudes meters above the bottom. Half in the sand two Scottish steam boilers and a large triple-expansion steam engine. In the stern were many refractory boiler bricks marked “Sawyer & Fisher Phoenix No.1.”; “Savage” and “Sawerville”.
