= USS Courtney (SP-375) =

Minesweeper of the United States Navy

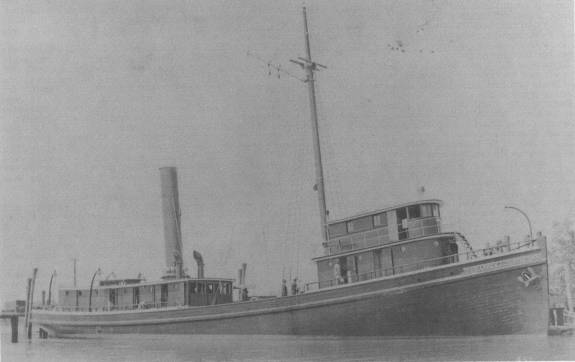
- Warren J. Courtney prior to her 1917-1919 service as USS Courtney

History

United States
- Name: USS Courtney
- Builder: Jackson and Sharp Company, Wilmington, Delaware
- Completed: 1912
- Acquired: 28 May 1917
- Commissioned: 10 August 1917
- Renamed: Courtney 28 July 1917 (had been Warren J. Courtney)
- Stricken: 27 April 1919
- Fate: Foundered 27 April 1919

General characteristics
- Type: Patrol vessel and minesweeper
- Displacement: 276 long tons (280 t)
- Length: 156 ft (48 m)
- Beam: 23 ft 3 in (7.09 m)
- Draft: 2 ft (0.61 m) (mean)
- Propulsion: Steam engine(s)
- Speed: 12 kn (14 mph; 22 km/h)
- Complement: 36
- Armament: 2 × 3 in (76 mm) guns, 2 × machine guns
- Notes: Built as commercial trawler Warren J. Courtney

The first USS Courtney (SP-375) was a patrol boat and minesweeper in commission in the United States Navy from 1917–1919.

Courtney was built in 1912 by Jackson and Sharp, Boat builders of Wilmington, Delaware, as Warren J. Courtney, a wooden-hulled steam fishing vessel of the "Menhaden Fisherman" design. The U.S. Navy acquired her from the C. E. Davis Packing Company of Reedville, Virginia, on 28 May 1917 for World War I service. She was designated SP-375, but before she could be put into commission as USS Warren J. Courtney the Navy shortened her compound name to the surname only under the terms of General order No. 314 promulgated on 28 July 1917. She thus was commissioned at the Norfolk Naval Shipyard at Portsmouth, Virginia, on 10 August 1917, as USS Courtney (SP-375).

Intended for service as a convoy escort and patrol craft for "distant service," Courtney was fitted out and then sailed for France. She convoyed and escorted transports and supply ships, operating out of Brest, France, as a unit of the Patrol Force, until operational difficulties – unseaworthiness – resulted in the restriction of the "Menhaden Fisherman" trawlers to minesweeping and coastal duties. Thus, Courtney operated as a minesweeper for the rest of her career and through the end of World War I on 11 November 1918.

Courtney departed Brest for the United States with minesweeper Otis W. Douglas and other vessels on 27 April 1919. Although weather conditions appeared favorable, a storm developed shortly after their departure. The ships headed back toward Brest, but in the heavy seas, Courtney and Otis W. Douglas sank on 27 April. Courtney was struck from the Naval Vessel Register the same day.
