= USS King (DD-242) =

Clemson-class destroyer

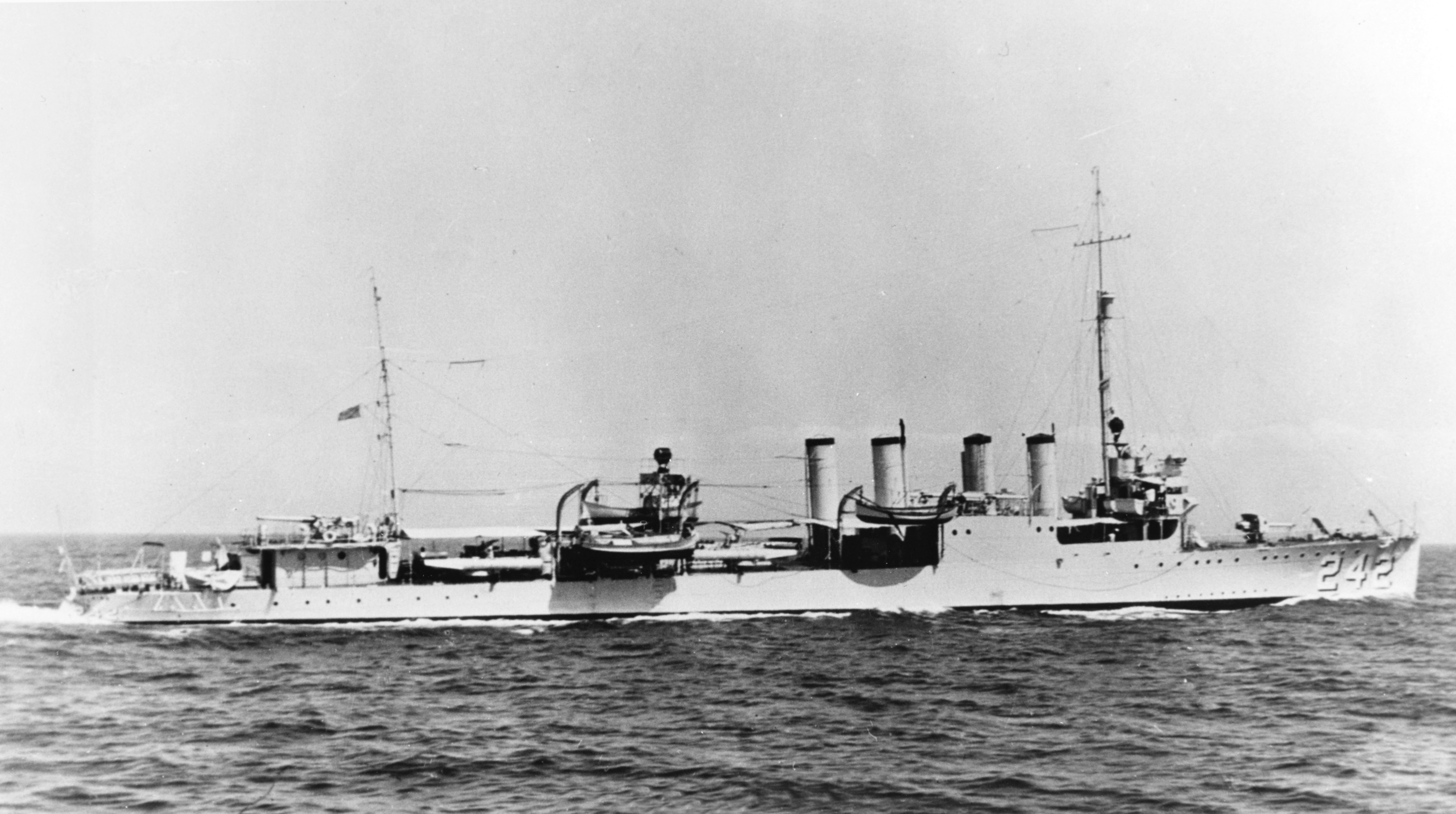
- USS King (DD-242) underway before World War II

History

United States
- Namesake: Frank Ragan King
- Builder: New York Shipbuilding
- Laid down: 28 April 1919
- Launched: 14 October 1920
- Commissioned: 16 December 1920
- Decommissioned: 23 October 1945
- Stricken: 16 November 1945
- Fate: Sold for scrapping, 29 September 1946

General characteristics
- Class & type: Clemson-class destroyer
- Displacement: 1,190 tons
- Length: 314 feet 5 inches (95.83 m)
- Beam: 31 feet 8 inches (9.65 m)
- Draft: 9 feet 3 inches (2.82 m)
- Propulsion: 26,500 shp (20 MW); geared turbines, 2 screws
- Speed: 35 knots (65 km/h)
- Range: 4,900 nm @ 15 kn (9,100 km @ 28 km/h)
- Complement: 101 officers and enlisted
- Armament: 4 x 4 in (100 mm) guns, 1 x 3 in (76 mm) gun, 12 x 21 inch (533 mm) tt.

USS King (DD-242) was a Clemson-class destroyer in the United States Navy during World War II. She was the first ship named for Commander Frank Ragan King.

King was laid down 28 April 1919 and launched 14 October 1920 by the New York Shipbuilding Corporation; sponsored by Mrs. Allene A. King, widow of Commander King; and commissioned 16 December 1920.

== Service history ==
After shakedown and training operations along the Atlantic Coast, King cleared Hampton Roads 2 October 1921 for her first Mediterranean cruise. Arriving Smyrna, Turkey, 8 November, the destroyer received 300 Greek refugees for transport to Mitylene, Greece. The destroyer served as station ship during the Greco-Turkish War, remaining in Turkish waters until June 1923.

Upon return to the United States during the summer, King joined the Atlantic Scouting Fleet and from 1923 to 1930 engaged in fleet exercises and reserve training cruises along the coast and in the Caribbean. She sailed for the Pacific 15 April 1925 for maneuvers in Hawaiian waters. During the spring of 1927, she patrolled waters off Nicaragua to protect American citizens and interests during the civil war in that country. King decommissioned at Philadelphia 10 March 1931.

She recommissioned 13 June 1932 and departed Hampton Roads 18 August to join the Pacific Scouting Force. King operated out of California for the next 6 years, engaging in central Pacific exercises, reserve cruises and training maneuvers to strengthen America's powerful sea force. The destroyer decommissioned at San Diego, California 21 September 1938.

=== World War II ===
Soon after Nazi aggression began the Second World War in Europe, King recommissioned 26 September 1939. The destroyer cleared San Diego 13 November to join the Caribbean Neutrality Patrol. Following arrival at Norfolk, Virginia 22 February 1940, the destroyer operated along the East Coast on Neutrality Patrol out of Boston, Massachusetts and Key West, before returning to the West Coast during the fall. She continued patrol and maneuvers out of San Francisco, California, operating in that area at the outbreak of hostilities with Japan.

During the first five months of the war, King operated on patrol and escort duty along the West Coast. Departing Mare Island 22 May 1942, she joined Task Force 8 escorting troop transport President Fillmore to the Aleutian Islands. Arriving Dutch Harbor 3 June, King operated on antisubmarine warfare (ASW) and screening patrols in the Aleutians throughout the summer, and fought with Task Group 8.6 during the bombardment of Kiska in August. She remained in the Aleutians until she sailed for San Francisco 22 December 1943.

After overhaul, King operated off the West Coast for the rest of the war, as patrol vessel and an ASW screen. She departed Treasure Island 28 August 1945 arriving Philadelphia 20 September. King decommissioned there 23 October 1945, and was sold to Boston Metals for scrapping on 29 September 1946.

== Awards ==
King received one battle star for World War II service.
