= Federal Reserve Statistical Release H.4.1 =

Federal Reserve Statistical Release H.4.1 summarizes the balance sheet of the Federal Reserve System of the United States. The releases are weekly, usually each Thursday, generally at 4:30 p.m.
