= USS Otis W. Douglas =

Minesweeper of the United States Navy

History

United States
- Name: USS Otis W. Douglas
- Namesake: Previous name retained
- Builder: Jackson and Sharp, Wilmington, Delaware
- Completed: 1912
- Acquired: 7 April 1917
- Commissioned: 10 August 1917
- Fate: Foundered, 27 April 1919
- Notes: Served as civilian freight boat Otis W. Douglas 1912-1917

General characteristics
- Type: Minesweeper
- Displacement: 300 long tons (305 t)
- Length: 158 ft (48 m)
- Beam: 24 ft (7.3 m)
- Draft: 8 ft 9 in (2.67 m)
- Speed: 12 miles per hour
- Armament: 2 × 3 in (76 mm) guns, 2 × .30 in (7.6 mm) machine guns

USS Otis W. Douglas (SP-313) was a United States Navy minesweeper in commission from 1917-1919.

Otis W. Douglas was built as a commercial motor freight boat in 1912 by Jackson and Sharp at Wilmington, Delaware. The U.S. Navy purchased her from the Douglas Company of Reedville, Virginia on 7 April 1917 for World War I use. After conversion into a minesweeper, she was commissioned at Norfolk, Virginia on 10 August 1917 as USS Otis W. Douglas (SP-313).

Immediately after commissioning, Otis W. Douglas departed Norfolk for Brest, France, where she assumed minesweeping duties around Belle Île and the entrance to Loire River. Her efforts aided in keeping convoy routes clear for the safe passage of troop ships and supply vessels. Continuing these efforts until the spring of 1919, Otis W. Douglas worked until the last mines were destroyed.

Otis W. Douglas departed Brest for the United States with minesweeper Courtney and other vessels on 27 April 1919. Although weather conditions appeared favorable, a storm developed shortly after their departure. The ships headed back toward Brest, but in the heavy seas, Otis W. Douglas began leaking badly and sank — as did Courtney — on 27 April.
