= ML-191 (motor launch boat) =

History
- Name: ML-191
- Owner: Royal Navy
- Builder: Electric Launch Company
- Completed: 1915
- Maiden voyage: 1915
- In service: 1915
- Out of service: 29 September 1919
- Fate: Disappeared

General characteristics
- Type: Motor launch
- Tonnage: 37 disp
- Length: 34.1 metres (111 ft 11 in)
- Beam: 5.6 metres (18 ft 4 in)
- Depth: 1.2 metres (3 ft 11 in)
- Propulsion: Diesel engine
- Speed: 19 knots
- Armament: 1 x 3pdr plus depth charges

ML-191 was a British motor launch boat that disappeared in the North Sea while on passage from Norway.

== Construction ==
ML-191 was constructed in 1915 by the Electric Launch Company. She was completed in 1915 and she was named ML-191 and served from 1915 until her disappearance in 1919.

The ship was 34.1 metres (111 ft 11 in) long, with a beam of 5.6 metres (18 ft 4 in) and a depth of 1.2 metres (3 ft 11 in). The ship was assessed at 37 disp and she had a diesel engine that could reach a speed of 19 knots.

== Disappearance ==
On 29 September 1919, ML-191 along with ML-18 and ML-62 were on passage from Norway when they disappeared in the North Sea. The crew and ships were never found, and the number of casualties is unknown.
