= HMS Vulcan (1889) =

Cruiser of the Royal Navy

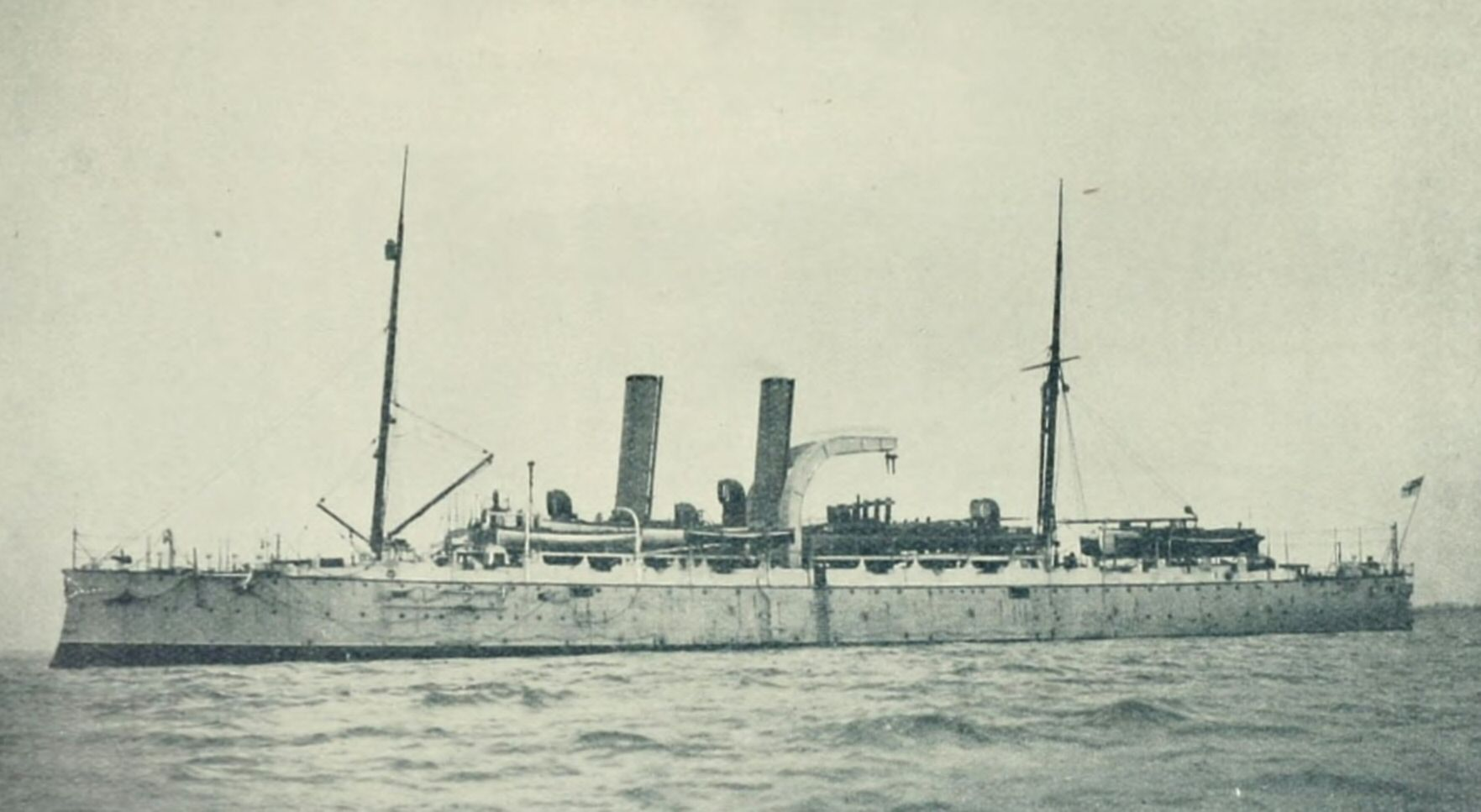
- Vulcan as a torpedo depot ship

History

United Kingdom
- Name: Vulcan
- Builder: Portsmouth Dockyard
- Launched: 13 June 1889

General characteristics
- Displacement: 6820 tons
- Length: 350 ft (110 m) pp
- Beam: 58 ft (18 m)
- Draught: 23 ft 6 in (7.16 m)
- Propulsion: Humphrys and Tennant. 12,000 IHP twin screw
- Speed: 20 kts
- Complement: 432
- Armament: 8 × 4.7 in; 12 × 3 pdr; 1 boat gun; 16 × machine guns; held on deck: 6 × 16-ton torpedo boats; 2 × countermining launches; 4 other steam boats
- Armour: Steel deck, 2.5-5 in

HMS Vulcan was a British torpedo boat depot ship launched in 1889, later converted to a submarine tender in 1908-09. As a training hulk, she was renamed HMS Defiance III in 1931 and used for training at Torpoint, Cornwall. She was scrapped in Belgium in 1955.

== Construction ==
The increasing numbers of torpedo boats which had entered service produced the need for a specialist support ship. Vulcan could carry six torpedo boats on her deck and had repair workshops and equipment stores. She had an armoured deck and could act as a light cruiser.

== Service history ==
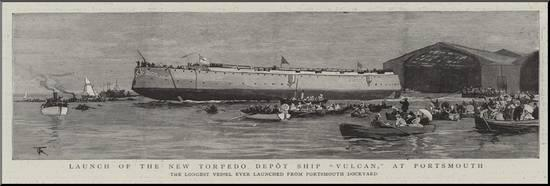
Launch of the New Torpedo Depot Ship 'Vulcan,' at Portsmouth, the longest vessel ever launched from Portsmouth, Dockyard. The Graphic, 1889

Vulcan was launched on 13 June 1889. Captain Henry Jackson was appointed in command in December 1899, when she served as a torpedo depot ship on the Mediterranean Station. In April 1900 she visited Plataea together with HMS Bruizer. Captain Charles John Briggs was appointed in command on 12 December 1901.

Robert Falcon Scott served aboard Vulcan as a midshipman.

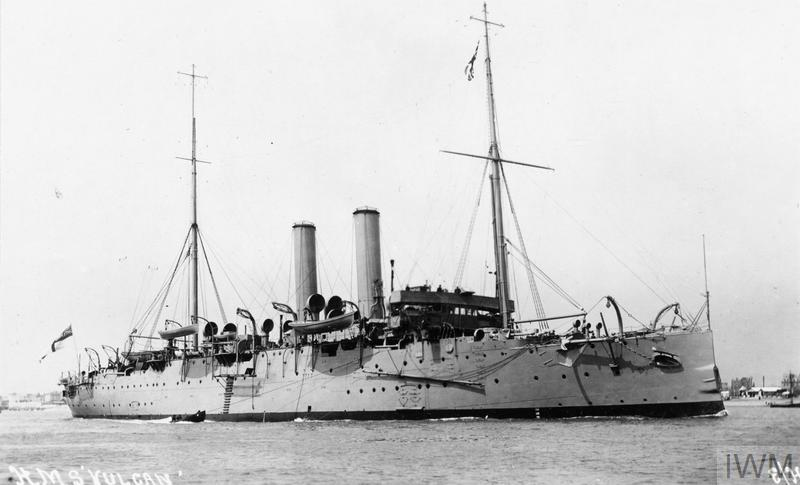
Vulcan, torpedo boat depot ship during WWI

By 1919, Vulcan was serving as a depot ship. On 18 October 1919, she was in harbour at Blyth, Northumberland (NZ319816) for repairs to her main engines and moored a few yards from the Royal Navy submarine HMS H41 when, during the afternoon, she built up a head of steam and began to carry out a slow-speed trial. In the restricted waters of the dock basin the suction from Vulcan′s propellers drew H41 towards her and, despite the efforts of both crews to keep the two vessels apart, Vulcan′s screws struck the stern of the submarine, cut through her outer casing, and sliced open her pressure hull. H41 sank quickly, but her crew escaped. H41 later was raised and sold for scrap.

In February 1930, HMS Titania returned to England from a 10-year period based in Hong Kong and was ordered to relieve HMS Vulcan as depot ship of the Sixth Flotilla. Her arrival in England was reported in The Straits Times on 11 February 1930 as follows:

SUBMARINES FROM CHINA

H.M.S. Titania, Commander A. B. Lockhart, D.S.C., which on her arrival home from China with submarines of the Fourth Flotilla, was ordered to relieve H.M.S. Vulcan, depot ship of the Sixth Flotilla, Portland.

She will retain her seagoing status. Of the six submarines returning with her, one will be retained in full commission to relieve H34 in the Fifth Flotilla. Submarine L3, completed in 1918, will be scrapped. The remaining four submarines will be reduced to reserve at Fort Blockhouse.
