= V125-class torpedo boat =

German ocean-going torpedo boat class

V125 class
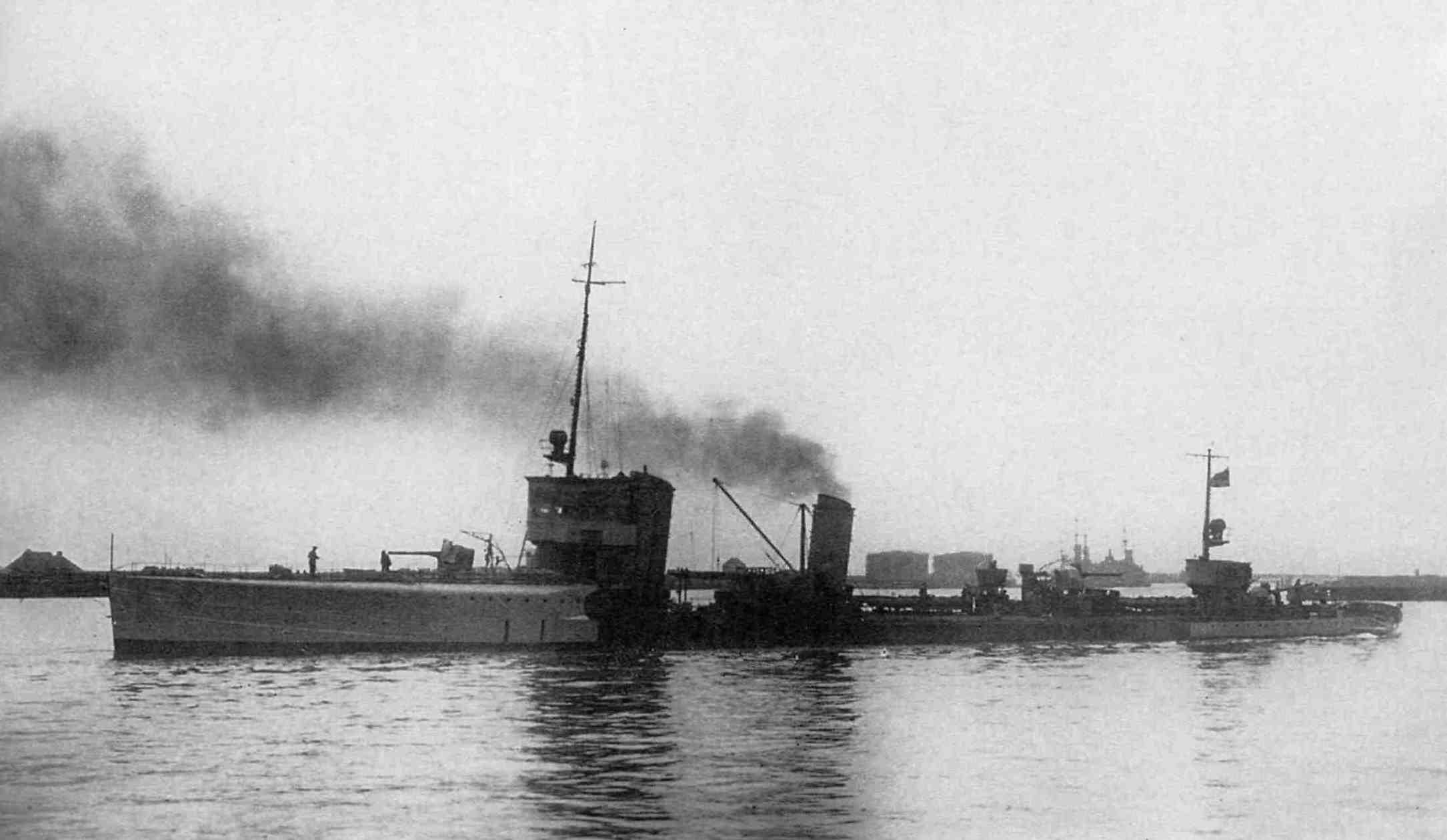
- SMS H147 in 1920

Class overview
- Operators: Imperial German Navy
- Built: 1917–1921
- In commission: 1917–1935
- Planned: 44
- Completed: 19
- Lost: 4

General characteristics
- Type: Torpedo boat
- Displacement: 924 t standard, may differ
- Length: 82 m (269 ft 0 in) oa
- Beam: 8.3 m (27 ft 3 in)
- Draught: 3.5 m (11 ft 6 in)
- Installed power: 23,500 hp (17,500 kW)
- Propulsion: 3 boilers, 2 Germania steam turbines; 2 shafts
- Speed: 34 knots (63 km/h; 39 mph)
- Range: 2,050 nmi (3,800 km; 2,360 mi) at 20 knots (37 km/h; 23 mph)
- Complement: 105
- Armament: 4 × 10.5 cm SK L/45 guns; 6 × 500 mm (19.7 in) torpedo tubes

The V125 class and subsequent H145 subclass, also known as the Großes Torpedoboot Type 1916Mob, were improved versions of the V25-class torpedo boats. They were built with a higher freeboard, which gave them better seakeeping capabilities while retaining good maneuverability.

== French service ==
After the end of World War I, the French Navy acquired five ships of this class as war reparations, becoming the Rageot de la Touche class. The last of the class were decommissioned and scrapped in 1935.

== Ships in class ==
Forty-four ships were planned for the V125 class with only nineteen ever being completed.

Name	Builders	Launched	Commissioned
G96	Germaniawerft	9 September 1916	23 December 1916
V125	Vulcan Stettin	18 May 1917	29 August 1917
V126	Vulcan Stettin	30 June 1917	25 September 1916
V127	Vulcan Stettin	28 July 1917	23 October 1917
V128	Vulcan Stettin	11 August 1917	15 November 1917
V129	Vulcan Stettin	19 November 1917	20 December 1917
V130	Vulcan Stettin	20 November 1917	2 February 1918
S131	Schichau Elbing	3 March 1917	11 August 1917
S132	Schichau Elbing	19 May 1917	2 October 1917
S133	Schichau Elbing	1 September 1917	21 February 1918
S134	Schichau Elbing	25 August 1917	4 January 1918
S135	Schichau Elbing	27 October 1917	15 March 1918
S136	Schichau Elbing	1 December 1917	30 April 1918
S137	Schichau Elbing	9 March 1918	14 June 1918
S138	Schichau Elbing	22 April 1918	29 July 1918
S139	Schichau Elbing	24 November 1917	15 April 1918
V140	Vulcan Stettin	22 December 1917	18 November 1918
V141	Vulcan Stettin	26 March 1918	
V142	Vulcan Stettin	25 September 1918	
V143	Vulcan Stettin	25 September 1918	
V144	Vulcan Stettin	10 October 1918	
H145	Howaldtswerke	11 December 1917	4 August 1918
H146	Howaldtswerke	23 January 1918	3 October 1918
H147	Howaldtswerke	13 March 1918	13 July 1920
G148	Germaniawerft		
G149	Germaniawerft		
G150	Germaniawerft		
Ww151	Kaiserliche Werft Kiel		
S152	Schichau Elbing	6 June 1918	
S153	Schichau Elbing	22 July 1918	
S154	Schichau Elbing	15 August 1918	
S155	Schichau Elbing	7 September 1918	
S156	Schichau Elbing	26 October 1918	
S157	Schichau Elbing	3 December 1918	
V158	Vulcan Stettin	11 November 1918	
V159	Vulcan Stettin	11 November 1918	
V160	Vulcan Stettin		
V161	Vulcan Stettin		
V162	Vulcan Stettin		
V163	Vulcan Stettin		
V164	Vulcan Stettin		
V165	Vulcan Stettin		
H166	Howaldtswerke	25 October 1919	
H167	Howaldtswerke	26 October 1918	
H168	Howaldtswerke	8 November 1919	
H169	Howaldtswerke	19 October 1918	
