= HMS H41 =

British H class submarine built by Armstrong Whitworth, Newcastle Upon Tyne, England

Coordinates: 55.128°N 1.501°W

History

United Kingdom
- Name: HMS H41
- Builder: Armstrong Whitworth, Newcastle upon Tyne
- Laid down: 17 September 1917
- Launched: 26 July 1918
- Commissioned: November 1918
- Fate: Sunk, 18 October 1919; Sold, 12 March 1920

General characteristics
- Class & type: H-class submarine
- Displacement: 423 long tons (430 t) surfaced; 510 long tons (518 t) submerged
- Length: 171 ft 0 in (52.12 m)
- Beam: 15 ft 4 in (4.67 m)
- Propulsion: 1 × 480 hp (358 kW) diesel engine; 2 × 620 hp (462 kW) electric motors
- Speed: 11.5 knots (21.3 km/h; 13.2 mph) surfaced; 9 knots (17 km/h; 10 mph) submerged
- Range: 2,985 nmi (5,528 km) at 7.5 kn (13.9 km/h; 8.6 mph) surfaced; 130 nmi (240 km) at 2 kn (3.7 km/h; 2.3 mph) submerged
- Complement: 22
- Armament: 4 × 21 in (533 mm) bow torpedo tubes; 8 × 21-inch torpedoes

HMS H41 was a British H-class submarine built by Armstrong Whitworth, Newcastle upon Tyne, England. She was laid down on 17 September 1917 and was commissioned in November 1918.

== Sinking ==
The submarine was moored in a dock basin at Blyth (NZ319816), a few yards from the 6,620-ton depot ship Vulcan. The ex-cruiser was in harbour for repairs to her main engines and during the afternoon she built up a head of steam and began to carry out a slow-speed trial. In the restricted waters of the dock basin the suction from the depot-ship's propellers drew the submarine towards her and, despite the efforts of both crews to keep the two vessels apart, Vulcan's screws struck the stern of the submarine, cut through her outer casing and sliced open the pressure hull. H41 sank quickly as the sea rushed in and the crew were lucky to escape.

HMS H41 was raised and was then sold on 12 March 1920 in Sunderland.
