= SS Daram =

American ship that ran aground in Bermuda

Coordinates: 32°16′06″N 64°59′13″W

History
- Name: Daram
- Owner: USSB
- Port of registry: Philadelphia
- Builder: Traylor Shipbuilding Corp., Cornwells Heights
- Yard number: 181
- Laid down: 26 December 1917
- Launched: 19 October 1918
- Completed: 19 December 1918
- In service: 28 December 1918
- Identification: US Official Number 217213; code letters LNSJ
- Fate: Wrecked, 9 October 1919

General characteristics
- Type: Cargo ship
- Tonnage: 2,573 GRT; 1,532 NRT; 3,588 DWT
- Length: 267.3 feet (81.5 m)
- Beam: 46.0 feet (14.0 m)
- Depth: 23.6 feet (7.2 m)
- Installed power: 1,400 ihp
- Propulsion: Screw propeller
- Speed: 10 knots

SS Daram was a Design 1001 wooden cargo ship, built for the Emergency Fleet Corporation of the United States Shipping Board, that ran aground on Long Bar Reef, Bermuda, while she was travelling from Pensacola, Florida, United States, to Marseille, France.

== Construction ==
Daram was constructed in 1918.

The ship was 81.4 metres (267 ft 1 in) long and had a beam of 14 metres (45 ft 11 in). The ship was assessed at 2,573 GRT. She had a Triple expansion steam engine driving a single screw propeller which could hit a speed of 10 knots.

== Sinking ==
On 9 October 1919, Daram was on a voyage from Pensacola, Florida, United States, to Marseille, France, when she ran aground on Long Bar Reef, Bermuda. There were no casualties.
