= Russian destroyer Azard =

Russian naval vessel

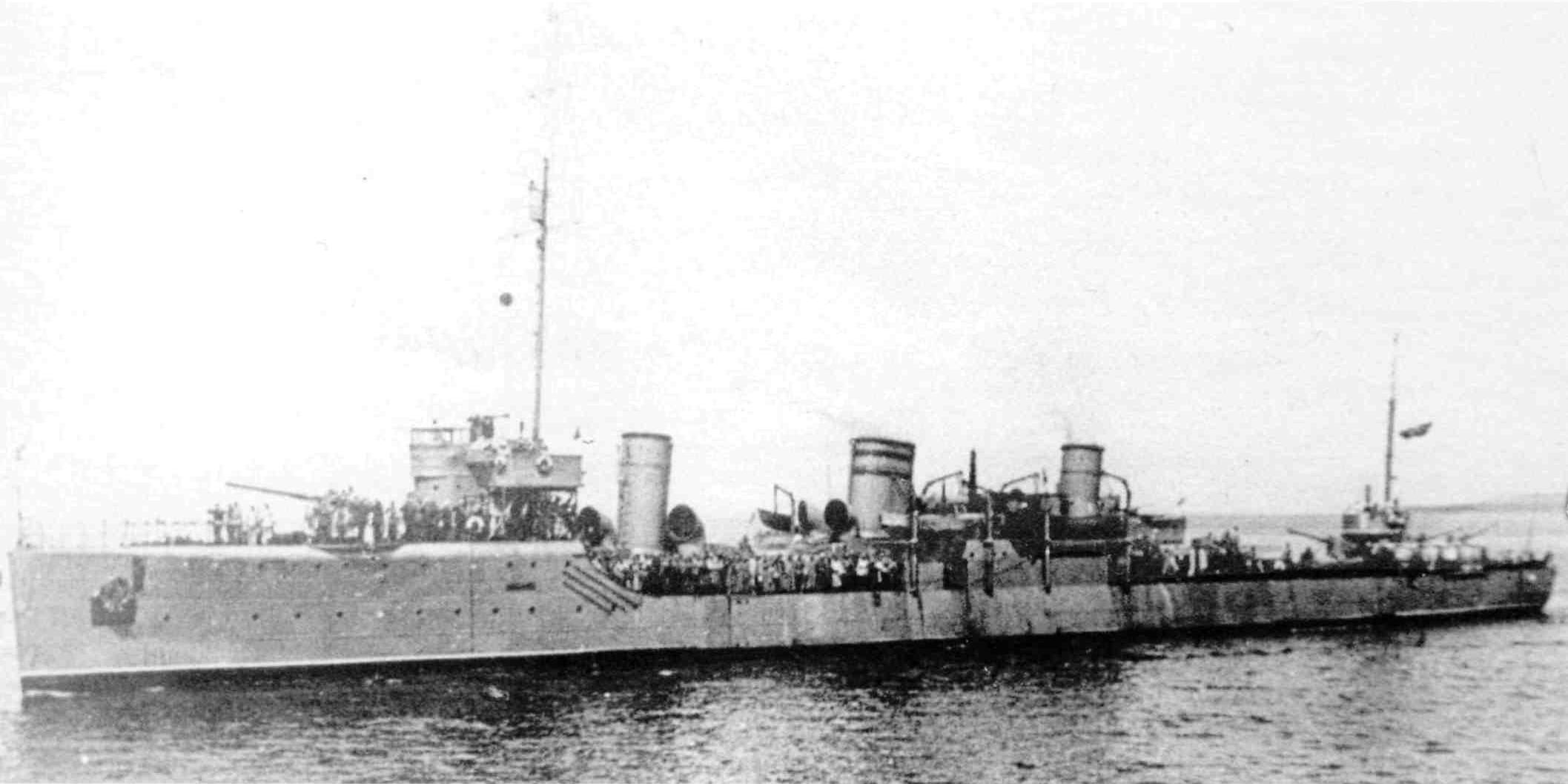
- Artem between 1928 and 1941

History

Russian Empire
- Name: Azard
- Builder: Metal Works, St. Petersburg
- Laid down: July 1915
- Launched: 23 May 1916
- Completed: 10 October 1916
- Fate: Joined the Bolsheviks, November 1917

Soviet Union
- Name: Zinoviev, 31 December 1922; Artem, 27 November 1928
- Acquired: November 1917
- Fate: Mined and sunk, 28 August 1941

General characteristics (as built)
- Class & type: Orfey-class destroyer
- Displacement: 1,260 long tons (1,280 t)
- Length: 98 m (321 ft 6 in)
- Beam: 9.34 m (30 ft 8 in)
- Draught: 2.98 m (9 ft 9 in)
- Installed power: 4 Normand boilers; 32,000 shp (24,000 kW)
- Propulsion: 2 shafts, 2 steam turbines
- Speed: 31 knots (57 km/h; 36 mph)
- Range: 1,680 nmi (3,110 km; 1,930 mi) at 21 knots (39 km/h; 24 mph)
- Complement: 150
- Armament: 4 × single 102 mm (4 in) guns; 1 × single 40 mm (1.6 in) AA gun; 3 × triple 450 mm (17.7 in) torpedo tubes

Azard (Азард) was one of eight Orfey-class destroyers built for the Russian Imperial Navy during World War I. Completed in 1916, she served with the Baltic Fleet and joined the Bolshevik Red Fleet after the October Revolution of 1917. The ship had to be towed from Helsinki, Grand Duchy of Finland, to Kronstadt in early 1918 during the "Ice Cruise". She was active during the Russian Civil War, taking part in several engagements against British ships during the British campaign in the Baltic. The destroyer was renamed Zinoviev (Зиновьев) in 1922 and Artem (Aртём) in 1928. She was still in service with the Soviet Baltic Fleet when the Axis powers invaded the Soviet Union in 1941 (Operation Barbarossa), and participated in the Gulf of Riga campaign. The ship was sunk by a mine on 28 August during the Soviet evacuation of Tallinn, Estonia.

== Design and description ==
In 1912, the Russian State Duma passed a shipbuilding programme for the Imperial Russian Navy that envisioned the construction of four battlecruisers, eight cruisers, 36 destroyers and 18 submarines, mainly for the Baltic Fleet. To meet this requirement, the Putilov Yard of Saint Petersburg proposed a modified version of the Derzky-class destroyer, to be built by Putilov, the Metal Works of Saint Petersburg, and the Russo-Baltic Yard of Reval (Tallinn) in the Governorate of Estonia. An order for 22 destroyers to Putilov's design was placed with the three shipyards in December 1912.

Azard had an overall length of 98 m (321 ft 6 in), with a beam of 9.34 m (30 ft 8 in) and a draught of 2.98 m (9 ft 9 in). She normally displaced 1,260 metric tons (1,240 long tons) and 1,569 t (1,544 long tons) at full load. The Orfey-class destroyers were propelled by two AEG-Vulcan steam turbines, each driving one propeller shaft using steam from four Normand boilers. The turbines were designed to produce a total of 32,000 metric horsepower (24,000 kW) using forced draft for an intended maximum speed of 35 knots (65 km/h; 40 mph). On Azard's sea trials, the ship only reached 31.5 knots (58.3 km/h; 36.2 mph). The Orfeys carried enough fuel oil to give them a range of 1,680 nautical miles (3,110 km; 1,930 mi) at 21 knots (39 km/h; 24 mph). Their crew numbered 150.

The Orfey-class ships were originally intended to have an armament of two single 102-millimetre (four-inch) Pattern 1911 Obukhov guns and a dozen 450-millimetre (17.7 in) torpedo tubes in six double mounts. The Naval General Staff changed this to four triple mounts once they became available in 1914; based on a battle between the destroyer Novik and two German destroyers in August 1915, they decided to exchange the rearmost torpedo mount for two more 102 mm guns while the ships were still under construction. One of these guns was mounted on the forecastle and three on the stern, aft of the torpedo tubes. Azard was completed with a 40-millimetre (1.6 in) anti-aircraft (AA) gun, and was also equipped with a pair of 7.62-millimetre (0.3 in) Maxim machine guns on single mounts. The Orfeys were completed with one triple torpedo mount between the forward funnels and two mounts aft of the rear funnel and could carry 80 M1912 naval mines or 50 larger ones. They were also fitted with a 2.7-metre (9 ft) Barr and Stroud rangefinder and two 60-centimetre (24 in) searchlights.

== Construction and career ==
Azard was laid down in July 1915 at the Metal Works in Saint Petersburg, launched on 23 May 1916 (9 May 1916 Old Style) and commissioned on 10 October 1916 (27 September 1916 Old Style). The ship was assigned to the 2nd Destroyer Division of the Baltic Fleet on commissioning and was employed on screening operations for the fleet, convoy escort and patrol. Possibly due to the drop in combat readiness in the Baltic Fleet consequent to the February Revolution, the Naval General Staff did not plan any offensive sorties into the Baltic Sea in 1917. Sometime during 1917, the ship's 40 mm AA gun was replaced by a 76-millimetre (3 in) Lender weapon. Azard's crew sided with the Bolsheviks following the October Revolution, joining the Red Fleet. In March 1918, Germany intervened in the Finnish Civil War, landing a division of troops (the Baltic Sea Division) to reinforce the Finnish White forces. The advance of the Germans and White Finns soon threatened the ice-bound port of Helsingfors (Helsinki), where the Baltic Fleet was based. Azard was part of the last echelon to depart before the Germans gained control of the city and had to be towed to Kronstadt from 10 to 16 April in the "Ice Cruise". The ship was damaged during the voyage and was subsequently repaired.

=== Russian Civil War ===
Azard was active during the Russian Civil War and from 4–24 December 1918 shelled German and Estonian forces near Aseri and Kunda in Estonia. Fyodor Raskolnikov, Commissar of the Baltic Fleet, planned an attack on British naval forces at Reval (Tallinn) on 25 December, to be carried out by Azard and the destroyers Spartak and Avtroil, with the protected cruiser Oleg and pre-dreadnought battleship Andrei Pervozvanny in distant support. Azard was out of fuel and Avtroil was suffering from mechanical problems, so Spartak attacked Reval alone on the morning of 26 December, but was caught by the British destroyers Vendetta, Vortigern and Wakeful while trying to retreat to Kronstadt. Spartak ran aground and surrendered to the British.

On 29 May 1919, Azard was escorting six minesweepers when the ships were spotted by the British submarine L16. The submarine unsuccessfully attacked the destroyer with two torpedoes the following day; the submarine E27's subsequent attack was equally unsuccessful. This encounter prompted the British to send a force of three light cruisers and six destroyers into the Gulf of Finland, arriving off Seskar on 30 May. The following day, Azard was again escorting minesweepers, with the dreadnought Petropavlovsk as distant cover, when it encountered the British destroyer Walker. Azard opened fire on Walker, but the remainder of the British force soon arrived on the scene, and Azard retreated towards Petropavlovsk and behind a minefield, with both the two Russian ships and coastal artillery maintaining fire on Walker until the British broke off the engagement. Walker was hit twice with slight damage. On 2 June 1919, Azard and the destroyer Gavriil were engaged by the British destroyers Vivacious and Voyager across a minefield, with no damage occurring on either side. A similar exchange of fire occurred on 4 June, between Gavriil and Azard on the Russian side and the destroyers Versatile, Vivacious and Walker, with Petropavlovsk providing distant support to the Russian destroyers. Shortly after this exchange of fire, the British submarine L55 attempted a torpedo attack against the two Russian destroyers, but accidentally surfaced after the attack and the destroyers opened fire. L55 attempted to dive to safety, but struck a mine and sank with the loss of all hands. On the morning of 21 October 1919, Azard and the destroyers Gavriil, Konstantin and Svoboda, set out from Kronstadt to lay a minefield in Koporye Bay to deter British ships supporting Estonian troops advancing on Petrograd, but ran into a British minefield. Gavriil, leading the destroyers, was the first to strike a mine at 05:48 and sank after twenty minutes. Konstantin and Svoboda were sunk by mines within minutes, with only Azard, at the rear of the formation, escaping unharmed. Only 25 men were rescued from the three lost destroyers. (Note: While the official enquiry into the loss blamed it on inadequate knowledge of British movements and minefields, some sources, including the British Naval officer Augustus Agar, state that the event was an attempt by the four destroyers to defect, with the ship's orders being doctored to ensure that they would be put into a position where they would have to surrender.)

The ship was renamed Zinoviev on 31 December 1922, and underwent a major refit in 1923–1924 during which the bridge was enclosed. She was commanded by Gordey Levchenko, later to become an Admiral in the Soviet Navy, from April 1928 to May 1929. The ship was again renamed to Artem on 27 November 1928. Artem was modernized in 1933, which included the installation of a 45-millimetre (1.8 in) 21-K AA gun, three reload torpedoes, and ten 165-kilogram (364 lb) B-1 and fifteen 41-kilogram (90 lb) M-1 depth charges. By 1938 the 7.62 mm machine guns were beginning to be replaced by 12.7-millimetre (0.50 in) DShK heavy machine guns. These changes increased its displacement to about 1,700 t (1,700 long tons) and draft to 3.8 m (12 ft 6 in), both at full load, and its crew to approximately 180 men.

=== World War II ===
She unsuccessfully searched for Polish submarines in the Gulf of Finland from 19 to 21 September 1939. After the Winter War began on 30 November, the ship bombarded Finnish coastal-defense positions on and near Saarenpää Island, part of the Beryozovye Islands, in conjunction with other ships, on 9–10 and 18–19 December. The Soviet Navy transferred its 3rd Destroyer Division, consisting of Karl Marx, Artem and her sister ships Volodarsky and Engels to its newly acquired base at Hanko, Finland, on 20 March 1940. In 1941, the ship became the flotilla leader of the 2nd Submarine Brigade.

On 22 June, the Axis Powers invaded the Soviet Union and Artem was transferred back to the 3rd Destroyer Division. In response to the attack the Baltic Fleet ordered minefields to be laid in the Gulf of Finland. The destroyer was assigned to a force sailing from Tallinn that also included the destroyer leaders Leningrad and Minsk, the destroyers Karl Marx and Volodarsky and the minelayers Marti and Ural. The following day, Artem, Volodarsky and Karl Marx were part of the covering force for minelayers laying minefields between Hanko and Osmussuaari, Estonia. Artem escorted the badly damaged cruiser Maxim Gorky to Tallinn on 24–25 June and then helped to lay another minefield on 26 June before escorting the cruiser to Kronstadt on 27 June. The ship was one of the destroyers that escorted the battleship Oktyabrskaya Revolutsiya from Tallinn to Kronstadt on 1 July.

Beginning in August Artem served as the flotilla leader for the 3rd Destroyer Division. On 2 August, the ship was unsuccessfully attacked by the German motor-torpedo boats S-55 and S-58 in the Gulf of Riga. On 21 August, Artem and the destroyer Surovy unsuccessfully attacked German transports in the Irben Strait. By August 1941, Tallinn was surrounded by German troops, with the Germans launching an assault on the city on 19 August. The Soviet evacuation of Tallinn began on 27 August, with 190 ships being split between four convoys bound for Kronstadt. On the night of 27/28 August, Artem, Volodarsky and the destroyer Kalinin formed part of the rear guard for the evacuation convoys. They provided covering fire during the night as the troops loaded onto the transports and then departed at 1600; Artem herself took aboard 250 evacuees. While trying to assist Kalinin which had struck a mine of the Juminda barrage, Artem hit a mine herself that broke the ship's back at 2400 and sank with the loss of all hands.
