= Sablin =

Sablin (Russian: Саблин, from сабля meaning sabre) is a Russian masculine surname, its feminine counterpart is Sablina. Notable people with the surname include:

- Anna Sablina (born 1945), Russian speed skater
- Artyom Sablin (born 1995), Russian football player
- Dmitry Sablin (born 1968) Ukrainian-born Russian politician and businessman
- Mikhail Sablin (1869–1920), Russian Admiral
- Nikolai Sablin (c.1850–1881), Russian revolutionary
- Nikolai Pavlovich Sablin, Russian naval officer, brother of Mikhail
- Valery Sablin (1939–1976), Soviet naval officer and mutineer
- Yuriy Sablin (1897–1937), Russian military leader, a Socialist Revolutionary

== Other uses ==
- Sablin, Kursk Oblast, a rural locality in Russia
