= Russian destroyer Gavriil =

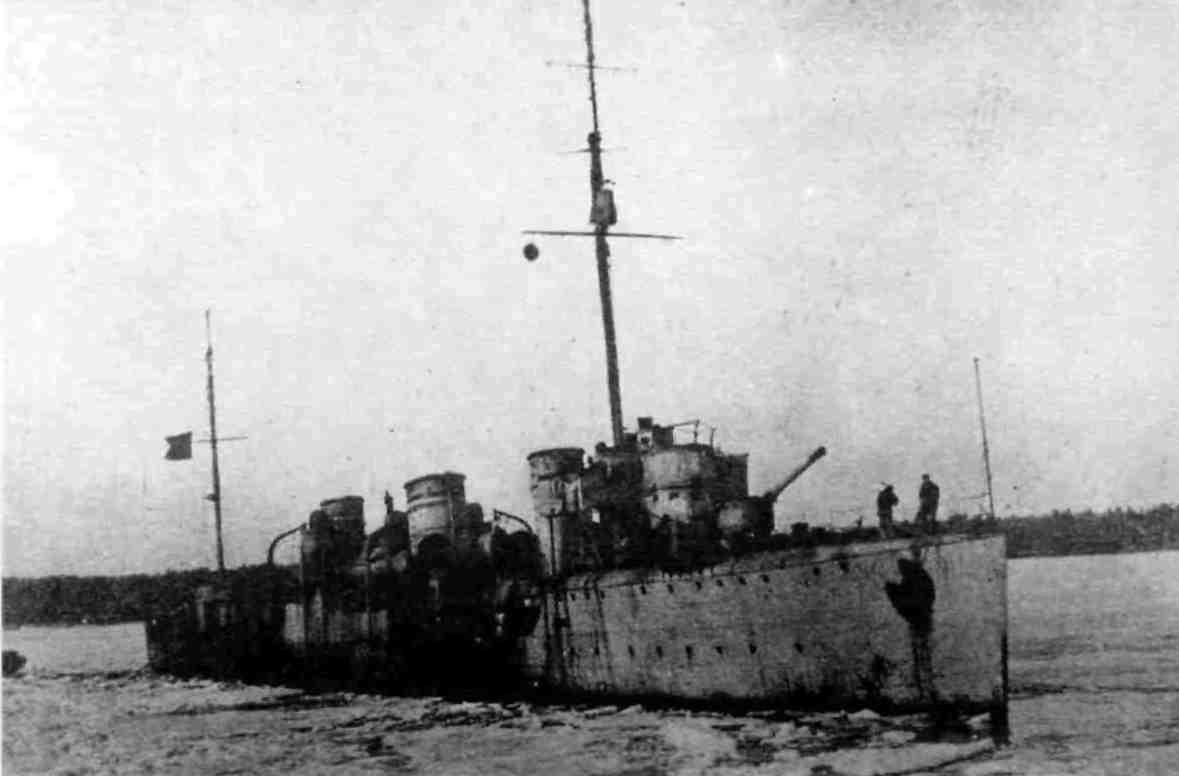
- Gavriil in 1918

History

Russian Empire
- Name: Gavriil
- Builder: Russo-Baltic Yard, Reval
- Launched: 5 January 1915
- Fate: Joined the Bolsheviks, November 1917

Soviet Union
- Acquired: November 1917
- Fate: Mined and sunk 21 October 1919

General characteristics
- Class & type: Orfey-class destroyer
- Displacement: 1,260 long tons (1,280 t)
- Length: 98 m (321 ft 6 in)
- Beam: 9.3 m (30 ft 6 in)
- Draught: 3 m (9 ft 10 in)
- Installed power: 4 water-tube boilers; 30,000 shp (22,000 kW)
- Propulsion: 2 shafts, 2 steam turbines
- Speed: 32 knots (59 km/h; 37 mph)
- Complement: 150
- Armament: 4 × single 102 mm (4 in) guns; 3 × triple 457 mm (18 in) torpedo tubes; 50 mines

Gavriil (Russian: Гавриил) was an Orfey-class destroyer of the Russian Imperial Navy. (Note: Sometimes also described as the name ship of the Gavriil class) The destroyer was built by the Russo-Baltic Yard at Reval (now Tallinn in Estonia), launching on 5 January 1915 and completing in October 1916. She served with the Baltic Fleet during the remainder of the First World War, and after the October Revolution joined the Bolshevik Red Fleet. She was active during the Russian Civil War, taking part in several engagements against British ships during the British campaign in the Baltic, and was sunk by a mine on 21 October 1919.

== Design and construction ==
In 1912, the Russian State Duma passed a shipbuilding programme for the Imperial Russian Navy that envisioned the construction of four battlecruisers, eight cruisers, 36 destroyers and 18 submarines, mainly for the Baltic Fleet. To meet this requirement, the Putilov Yard of Saint Petersburg proposed a modified version of the Derzky-class destroyer, to be built by Putilov, the Metal Works of Saint Petersburg, and the Russo-Baltic Yard of Reval (now Tallinn) in Estonia. An order for 22 destroyers to Putilov's design was placed with the three shipyards in December 1912.

The Orfey-class destroyers were 98.0 m (321 ft 6 in) long, with a beam of 9.3 m (30 ft 6 in) and a draught of 3.0 m (9 ft 10 in). Displacement was 1,260 long tons (1,280 t) normal. Four Vulkan water-tube boilers fed steam at 17 atm (250 psi; 1,700 kPa) to AEG steam turbines that drove two propeller shafts. The machinery was rated at 30,000 shp (22,000 kW), (Note: 36,000–40,000 PS (36,000–39,000 shp; 26,000–29,000 kW) according to Fock.) giving a speed of 32 knots (59 km/h; 37 mph).

The ships were originally designed to carry an armament of two 102-millimetre (4.0 in) guns and four triple 450 mm (18 in) torpedo tubes, but during construction, the Russian Naval Staff decided to strengthen the gun armament, replacing one set of torpedo tubes with two more 102 mm guns. One 40 mm (1.6 in) anti-aircraft gun was fitted, while 50 mines could be carried. The ships had a crew of 150.

Gavriil was laid down on 8 December 1913 (24 November 1913 Old Style), at the Russo-Baltic Works Reval shipyard, was launched on 5 January 1915, and completed on 7 October 1916.

== Service ==
Gavriil took part in the Battle of Moon Sound in October–November 1917. On hearing of the October Revolution after return to port, Gavriil's crew sided with the Bolsheviks. Gavriil served with the Active Squadron of the Red Fleet in 1919, although fuel for operations was limited.

On 18 May 1919, Gavriil was escorting four minesweepers which had sortied from Kronstadt when the Russian force was spotted by the British cruiser Cleopatra, flagship of Rear Admiral Walter Cowan, commander of British naval forces in the Baltic. Cleopatra and the British destroyers Shakespeare, Scout and Walker set out in pursuit of the Russian ships, while Gavriil engaged the British ships to allow the slower minesweepers to escape. Gavriil was damaged by near misses from the British ships, which were unharmed, as Gavriil's guns did not have the range to reach the British, but the British broke off the engagement when they drew near Russian minefields and came under fire from Russian shore batteries.

On 2 June 1919, Gavriil and the destroyer Azard were engaged by the British destroyers Vivacious and Voyager across a minefield, with no damage occurring. A similar exchange of fire occurred on 4 June, between Gavriil and Azard on the Russian side and the destroyers Versatile, Vivacious and Walker, with the Russian battleship Petropavlovsk providing distant support to the Russian destroyers. Shortly after this exchange of fire, the British submarine L55 attempted a torpedo attack against the two Russian destroyers, but broke surface after the attack and was hit by a shell from Gavriil and sunk (possibly after striking a mine) with all hands. On the evening of 9 June 1919, Gavriil and Azard attacked British ships watching Kronstadt, firing 80 shells at the British destroyers Versatile, Vivacious and Walrus before withdrawing. No ships on either side was damaged. On 13 June, the forts of Krasnaya Gorka and Grey Horse, on the South side of Petrograd Bay, revolted against the Bolsheviks, and from 16 June, units of the Red Fleet bombarded these forts. Gavriil supported these bombardment operations.

On the night of 17/18 August 1919, seven British Coastal Motor Boats (CMBs) attacked Kronstadt. Gavriil, which was anchored outside the entrance to Kronstadt harbour, was targeted by CMB24, but the British boat's torpedo ran too deep and passed underneath the Russian destroyer. Gavriil's return fire quickly sank CMB24, but could not stop the remainder of the British force from entering the harbour, where they sank the submarine depot ship Pamiat Azova and damaging the battleship Andrei Pervozvanny. One CMB (CMB79) was sunk by a collision with CMB62. On leaving the harbour, CMB62 launched its torpedoes at Gavriil, but they too ran too deep and missed, and Gavrill's gunfire sank CMB62. (Note: The Russians credited Gavriil with sinking three CMBs.)

On the morning of 21 October 1919, Gavriil and the destroyers Azard, Konstantin and Svoboda, set out from Kronstadt to lay a minefield in Koporye Bay to deter British ships supporting Estonian troops advancing on Petrograd, but ran into a British minefield. Gavriil, leading the destroyers, was the first to strike a mine at 05:48 and sank after twenty minutes. Konstantin and Svoboda were sunk by mines within minutes, with only Azard, at the rear of the formation, escaping unharmed. Only 25 of the crew of the three sunken destroyers were rescued, with nineteen of those sailors from Gavriil who had escaped by boat, with 285 killed. Some sources state that the sortie was an attempt by the destroyer's crews to defect to the British.
