= British campaign in the Baltic (1918–1919) =

1918–1919 British naval intervention during Russian Civil War

Baltic Naval War
- Part of Russian Civil War, Estonian War of Independence, Latvian War of Independence
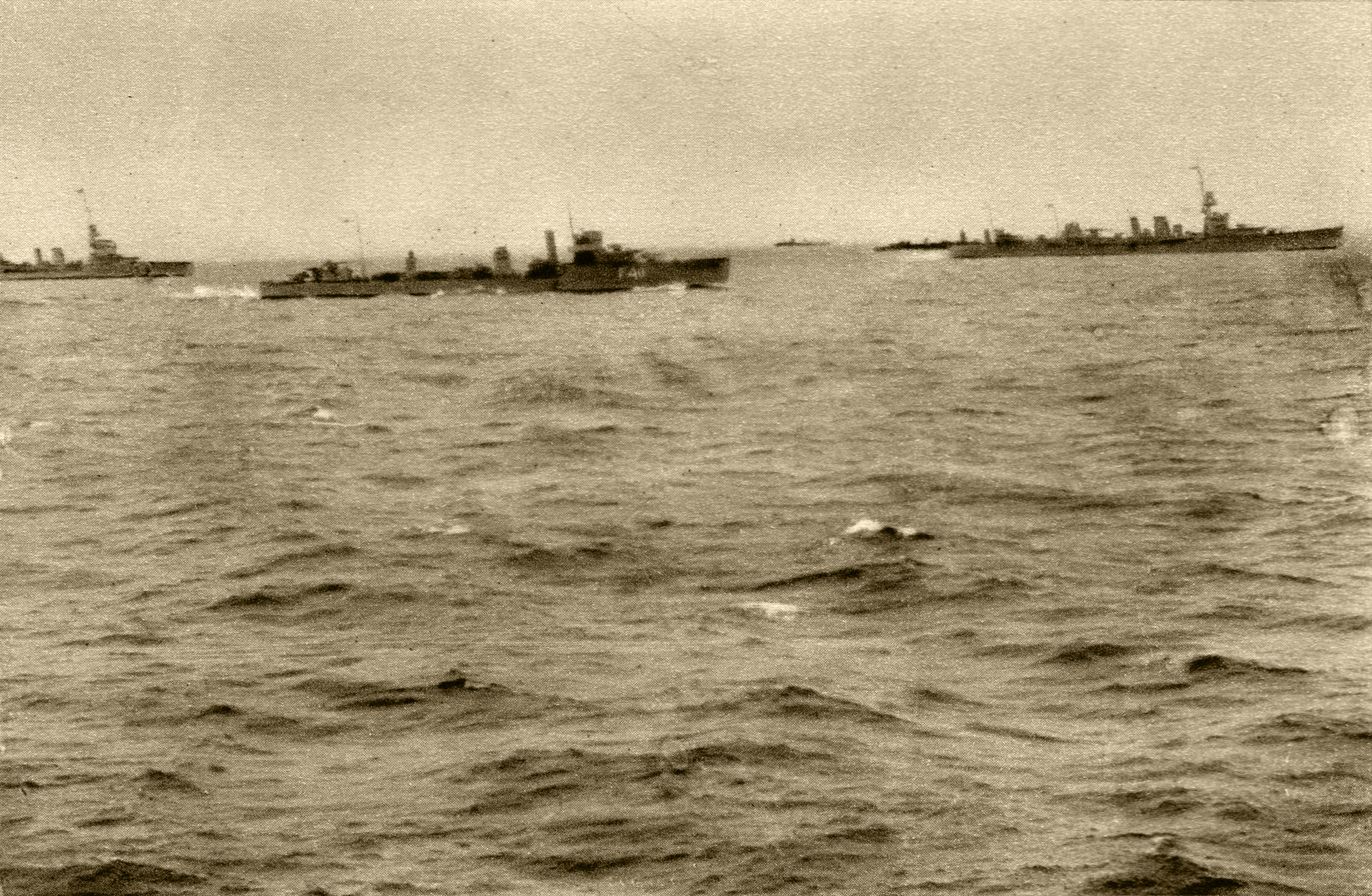
- British squadron in Koporye Bay in October 1919
| Date | 28 November 1918 – 4 November 1919 |
| Location | Baltic Sea |
| Result | Anglo-Soviet military stalemate Estonian victory |
| Territorial changes | Independence of Estonia and Latvia |

Belligerents
| United Kingdom; Estonia; Latvia (Russia) White movement | Russian SFSR |

Commanders and leaders
| (United Kingdom) Edwyn Alexander-Sinclair (United Kingdom) Walter Cowan (United Kingdom) Augustus Agar (Estonia) Johan Pitka | (Russian Soviet Federative Socialist Republic) Nikolai Kuzmin (Russian Soviet Federative Socialist Republic) Fyodor Raskolnikov (POW) (Russian Soviet Federative Socialist Republic) Sergey Zarubayev (Russian Soviet Federative Socialist Republic) Alexander Zelenoy (Russian Soviet Federative Socialist Republic) Lev Galler |

Strength
| (United Kingdom) : 1 aircraft carrier 1 monitor 23 light cruisers 85 destroyers 20 submarines 2 minelayers 18 minesweepers 10 coastal motor boats 4 depot ships (Estonia) : 2 destroyers 1 gunboat | 2 battleships 1 pre-dreadnought 1 cruiser 17 destroyers 7 submarines 3 minelayers 9 minesweepers 2 depot ships |

Casualties and losses
| (United Kingdom) : 111–128 killed at least 60 wounded 9 captured 1 cruiser sunk 2 destroyers sunk 1 submarine sunk 2 minesweepers sunk 8 coastal motor boats sunk or stranded 1 destroyer damaged 7 other ships lost 60 other ships damaged (Estonia) : 23 killed 3 missing 1 icebreaker-tug sunk | at least 483 killed 251 captured 1 battleship damaged 1 pre-dreadnought damaged 1 cruiser sunk 3 destroyers sunk 2 destroyers captured 1 submarine damaged 1 minesweeper defected 1 depot ship sunk |

The British campaign in the Baltic 1918–1919 was a part of the Allied intervention in the Russian Civil War. The codename of the Royal Navy campaign was Operation Red Trek. The intervention played a key role in enabling the establishment of the independent states of Estonia and Latvia. It failed to secure the control of Petrograd by White Russian forces, which was one of the main goals of the campaign.

== Context ==
Launched in the wake of the Armistice of 11 November 1918 which ended World War I and the German military occupation of the Baltic countries, the purposes of Operation Red Trek were to stop the rise of Bolshevism in the area, to support the newly independent countries of Estonia and Latvia, to protect British interests, and to extend the freedom of the seas.

The situation in the Baltic countries of Latvia and Estonia in the aftermath of World War I was chaotic. The Russian Empire had collapsed and Bolshevik Red Army, pro-independence and pro-German forces were fighting across the region. Riga had been occupied by the German army in 1917 and German Freikorps and Baltic-German Baltische Landeswehr units were still active in the area. Estonia had established a national army and, with the support of Finnish volunteers, was defending against an attack by the 7th Army of the Soviet Russian Red Army.

== Naval forces involved ==
=== Soviet forces ===
The Russian Baltic Fleet was the key naval force available to the Bolsheviks and essential to the protection of Petrograd. The fleet was severely depleted after the First World War and Russian revolution but still formed a significant force. At least one Gangut-class battleship, as well as several pre-dreadnought battleships, cruisers, destroyers and submarines were available. Many of the officer corps were on the White Russian side in the Civil War or had been murdered, but some competent leaders remained.

=== British forces ===
A Royal Navy squadron was sent under Rear-Admiral Edwyn Alexander-Sinclair. This force consisted of modern C-class cruisers and V- and W-class destroyers. In December 1918, Sinclair sallied into Estonian and Latvian ports, sending in troops and supplies, and promising to attack the Bolsheviks "as far as my guns can reach". In January 1919, he was succeeded in command by Rear-Admiral Walter Cowan. The deployment was unpopular among the Royal Navy sailors and there were minor mutinies in January and again in the autumn of 1919.

=== Main actions ===
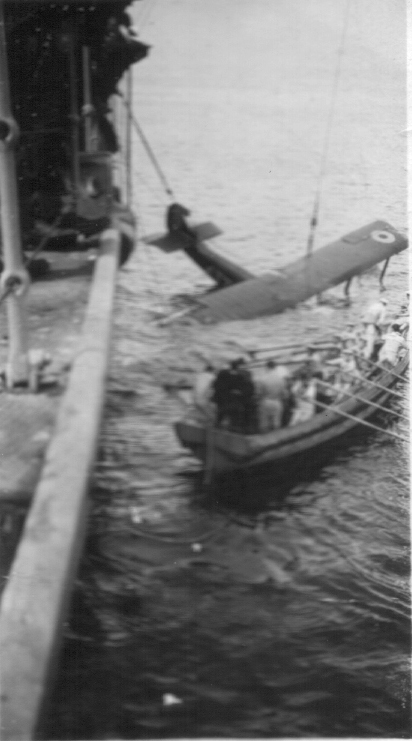
A plane ditched alongside HMS Vindictive after returning from air raid, Baltic Sea, 1919

The British intervention began soon after the Armistice which ended the First World War. Within a week of the war ending, an Estonian delegation had arrived in London asking for help in the shape of troops, ships and arms. The War Cabinet quickly took the decision to send a substantial naval force to the Baltic but on no account to provide troops.

British forces denied the Bolsheviks the ability to move by sea, Royal Navy ships bombarded the Bolsheviks on land in support of Estonian and Latvian troops, and provided supplies.

On the night of 4 December, the cruiser HMS Cassandra struck a German-laid mine while on patrol duties north of Liepāja, and sank with the loss of 11 of her crew.

At this time, the new Estonian government was weak and desperate. The Estonian Prime Minister asked Britain to send military forces to defend his capital, and even requested that his state be declared a British protectorate. The British would not meet these pleas.

British cruisers and destroyers soon sailed up the coast close to the Estonian-Russian border and laid down a devastating barrage on the advancing Bolsheviks' supply lines. On 26 December, British warships captured the Bolshevik destroyers Avtroil and Spartak, which at the time were shelling the port of Tallinn. Both units were presented to the Estonian Provisional Government and, as Lennuk and Vambola, formed the nucleus of the Estonian Navy. Forty Bolshevik prisoners of war were executed by the Estonian government on Naissaar in February 1919 despite British protests. The new Commissar of the Baltic Fleet—Fedor Raskolnikov—was captured onboard Spartak. He was exchanged on 27 May 1919 for 17 British officers captured by the Soviets and later appointed Commissar of the Caspian Flotilla by Trotsky. In the Baltic, Raskolnikov was replaced by Nikolai Kuzmin.

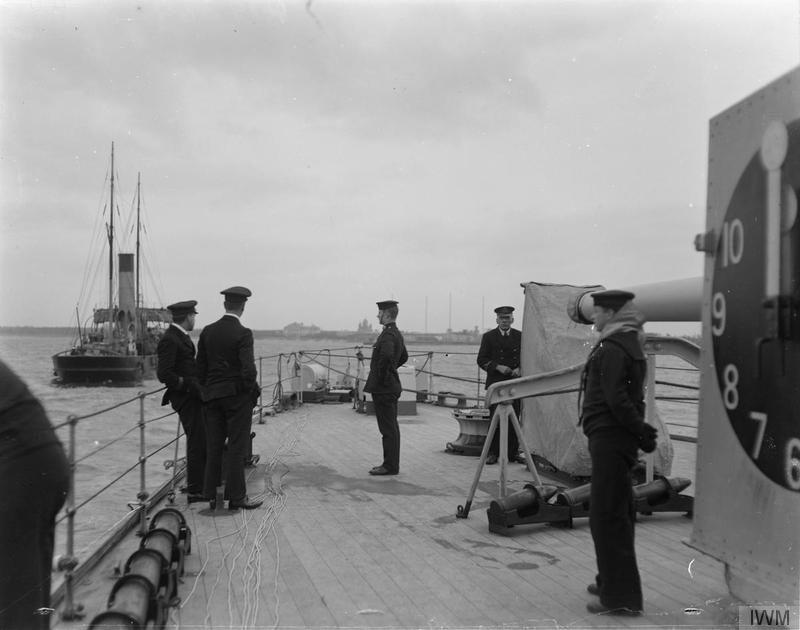
British sailors in Liepāja

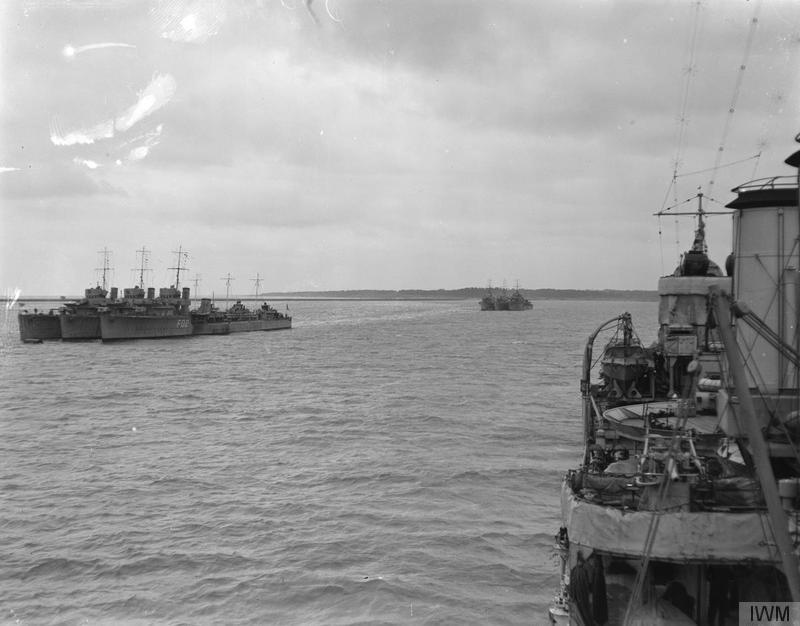
British ships in Liepāja

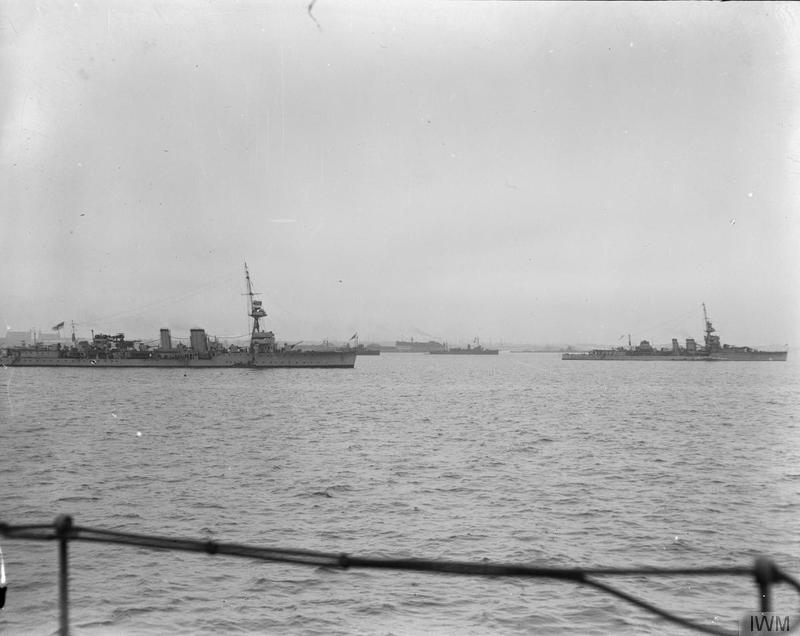
British cruisers in Liepāja

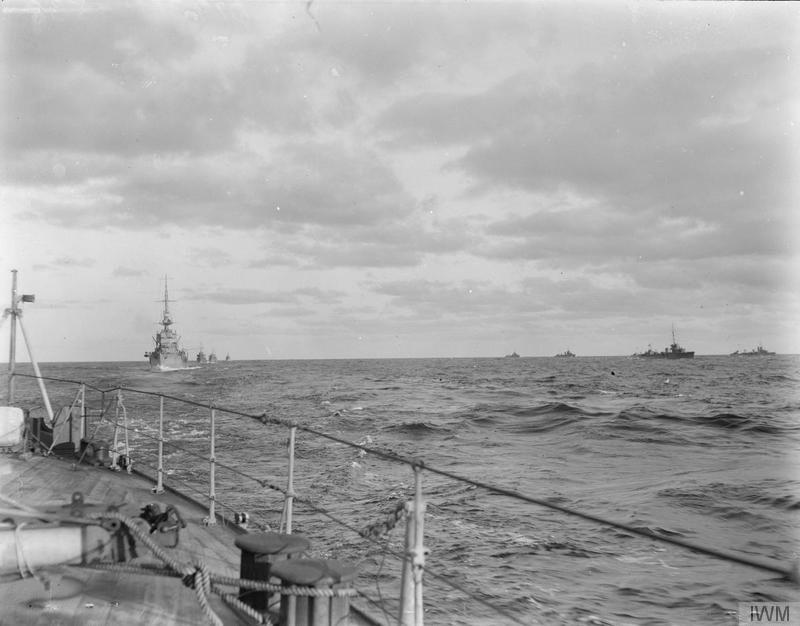
British ships on the way to Tallinn

In April 1919, Latvian Prime Minister Kārlis Ulmanis was forced to seek refuge on board the Saratov under the protection of British ships.

In the summer of 1919, the Royal Navy bottled up the Red fleet in Kronstadt. Several sharp skirmishes were fought near Kotlin Island. In the course of one of these clashes, on 31 May, during a Bolshevik probing action to the west, the battleship Petropavlovsk scored two hits on the destroyer HMS Walker from a distance of 14,000 yards (12,802 m), when a flotilla of British destroyers attempted to catch the outgunned Bolshevik destroyer Azard. Walker, which acted as a lure, suffered some damage and two of her crew were wounded, while the other British destroyers eventually disengaged when they came too close to Bolshevik coastal artillery and minefields. Admiral Cowan soon realised that Tallinn was not an ideal base of operations and sought a base closer to Kronstadt. On 5 June Cowan and his naval units arrived at the new anchorage at Björkö Sound, which proved ideal for actions against Kronstadt. However, on 9 June the Soviet Navy's destroyers Azard and Gavriil launched a raid on the location, and the submarine HMS L55 was sunk with all hands in the aftermath, apparently after being cornered in a British-laid minefield by the Soviet warships. The action prompted the British to lay several new obstacles and minefields to protect the anchorage. Cowan also requested that Finland allocate a squadron of ships to provide additional protection for the anchorage as well as to take part in the security and patrol duties in the area. The Finnish Navy complied and sent several gun and torpedo boats as well as motor minesweepers to Björkö.

The design of the naval jacks of Estonia and Latvia has been inspired by the Union Jack.

A flotilla of British Coastal Motor Boats under the command of Lieutenant Augustus Agar raided Kronstadt Harbour twice, sinking the cruiser Oleg and the depot ship Pamiat Azova on 17 June as well as damaging the battleships Petropavlovsk and Andrei Pervozvanny in August, at the cost of three CMBs in the last attack. The attackers also managed to sink the important Russian submarine depot ship. The British claim that the motor boats damaged the Petropavlosk is dismissed by Soviet records. The first raid was intended to support a significant mutiny at the Krasnaya Gorka fort which was eventually suppressed by the 12 in (300 mm) guns of the Bolshevik battleships. The second raid resulted in the deaths of 6 officers and 9 other ratings, and 9 others were taken prisoner. The action of this little unit ensured that the threat from Kronstadt to the British Baltic force was ended. In early July the British received reinforcements which included the aircraft carrier HMS Vindictive whose aircraft carried out bombing and strafing runs against gun and searchlight installations at Kronstadt.

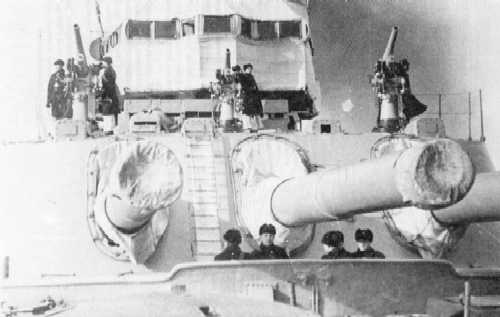
Fore turret of the battleship Petropavlovsk (1925)

In the autumn of 1919, British forces—including the monitor HMS Erebus—provided gunfire support to General Nikolai Yudenich's White Russian Northwestern army in its offensive against Petrograd. The Bolsheviks tried to disrupt these bombardments by laying mines using the Orfey-class destroyers Azard, Gavriil, Konstantin and Svoboda. The latter three ships were sunk in a British minefield on 21 October 1919, during an attempt to defect to Estonia. The British monitor Erebus attempted to assist in the siege of Krasnaya Gorka from 27 October, dislodging the defenders of the local fortress with its 15-inch guns, but by this time the White and Estonian forces were in retreat. The White army's offensive ultimately failed to capture Petrograd and on 2 February 1920, the Republic of Estonia and Bolshevist Russia signed the Peace Treaty of Tartu which recognised Estonian independence. This resulted in the withdrawal of the Royal Navy from the Baltic.

Due to a request from Cowan that the Finnish squadron remain in the region until he evacuated all his forces, three Finnish C-class torpedo boats became stuck in the ice when winter froze over the sea, and the expanding ice crushed the hulls and sank the vessels. The accompanying larger S-class torpedo boat survived because of its stronger hull while small motor minesweepers survived as they were simply pushed out of the water by the expanding ice. The last remaining C-class torpedo boats were placed in reserve after this incident.

Significant unrest took place among British sailors in the Baltic. This included small-scale mutinies amongst the crews of HMS Vindictive, Delhi—the latter due in part to the behaviour of Admiral Cowan—and other ships stationed in Björkö Sound. The causes were a general war-weariness (many of the crews had fought in World War I), poor food and accommodation, a lack of leave, and the effects of Bolshevik propaganda.

== Casualties and losses ==
=== British ===
- Light cruiser HMS Cassandra – mined, 5 December 1918
- V-class destroyers:
  - HMS Verulam – mined, 4 September 1919
  - HMS Vittoria – torpedoed by Bolshevik submarine Pantera, 31 August 1919
- Submarine HMS L55 – surface action against Bolshevik destroyers, 9 June 1919
- Arabis-class sloop: HMS Gentian and Myrtle – both mined, 16 Jul 1919.
- Coastal Motor Boats: CMB-24, CMB-62 and CMB-79 – surface action against Bolshevik Fleet at anchor
  CMB-67 – stranded, all on 18 August 1919.
- 7 other ships lost
- 60 other ships damaged

The deaths of 112 British servicemen— 107 RN personnel and five RAF personnel from HMS Vindictive —are commemorated on a memorial plaque, which was unveiled in 2005 at Portsmouth Cathedral in England, with similar memorials in the Church of the Holy Ghost, Tallinn and in St Saviour's Church, Riga.

=== Estonian ===
- Icebreaker tug Hector – struck a rock
- Coastal patrol boat Gorodenko – beached by storm

=== Soviet ===
- Cruiser Oleg – torpedoed by CMBs
- Depot ship Pamiat Azova – torpedoed by CMBs
- Destroyers Spartak and Avtroil – captured by the Royal Navy
- Destroyers Gavriil, Konstantin and Svoboda – mined, 21 October 1919
- Trawler Kitoboi – defected to White movement
- Ships of the Peipus flotilla – captured by Estonia

== See also ==
- List of states and regions involved in the Russian Civil War
- Bibliography of the Russian Revolution and Civil War
- Outline of the Russian Revolution and Civil War
- North Russia campaign
- British submarine flotilla in the Baltic
- HMS Dragon
- Latvian War of Independence
- Estonian War of Independence
- West Russian Volunteer Army
- Defence Forces Cemetery of Tallinn

== Citations and references ==
=== Cited sources ===
- Wright, Damien (2017). "Churchill's Secret War with Lenin: British and Commonwealth Military Intervention in the Russian Civil War, 1918–20", Solihull, UK
- Bennett, Geoffrey (1964). Cowan's war: the story of British naval operations in the Baltic, 1918–1920. London: Collins. OCLC 51700397.
  - Republished (2001) as: Freeing the Baltic. Edinburgh: Birlinn. ISBN 1-84341-001-X
- Jackson, Robert (2007). Battle of the Baltic. Barnsley: Pen & Sword Maritime. ISBN 978-1-84415-422-7.
- Kinvig, Clifford (2006). Churchill's Crusade: The British Invasion of Russia 1918–1920. Hambledon Continuum. ISBN 1-85285-477-4.
- Kettle, Michael (1992). Churchill and the Archangel Fiasco. Minneapolis: Univ. of Minnesota Press. ISBN 0-415-08286-2.
- "British-Bolshevik Navy Actions". Naval History.net. Archived from the original on 3 April 2009.
- Ben Nimmo. "The forgotten fleet: the British navy and Baltic independence". The Baltic Times.
- Walter Cowan. "Report by Walter Cowan (link to the 1st page)". Supplement to the London Gazette.
- Fletcher, William A. (Summer 1976). "The British navy in the Baltic, 1918–1920: Its contribution to the independence of the Baltic nations". Journal of Baltic Studies. 7 (2): 134–144. doi:10.1080/01629777600000141.
- Dunn, Steve (2020). Battle of the Baltic. Barnsley: Seaforth Publishing. ISBN 978-1-5267-4273-5.
- Bennett, Geoffrey (2012). Atbrīvojot Baltiju [Freeing the Baltic] (in Latvian). Riga, Latvia: Zvaigzne ABC. ISBN 978-9934-0-2904-2.
