= HMS L55 =

L-class submarine

History

United Kingdom
- Name: HMS L55
- Builder: Fairfield Shipbuilding and Engineering Company, Govan
- Launched: 29 September 1918
- Fate: Sunk, 9 June 1919

Soviet Union
- Name: Л-55 Bezbozhnik
- Acquired: Raised, 11 August 1928, and repaired
- Recommissioned: 7 August 1931
- Renamed: 7 August 1931
- Fate: Scrapped c. 1960

General characteristics
- Class & type: L class submarine
- Displacement: 960 long tons (975 t) surfaced; 1,150 long tons (1,168 t) submerged
- Length: 230 ft 6 in (70.26 m)
- Beam: 23 ft 6 in (7.16 m)
- Draught: 13 ft 1 in (3.99 m)
- Propulsion: 2 × Vickers diesel engines, 2,400 hp (1,790 kW); 2 × electric motors, 1,600 hp (1,193 kW); 2 shafts
- Speed: 17 knots (31 km/h; 20 mph) surfaced; 10.5 knots (19.4 km/h; 12.1 mph) submerged
- Range: 4,500 nmi (8,300 km) at 8 kn (15 km/h; 9.2 mph)
- Complement: 44
- Armament: 6 × 21 in (533 mm) bow torpedo tubes; 12 × 21 inch torpedoes; 2 × QF 4-inch guns

HMS L55 was a British L class submarine built by Fairfield Shipbuilding and Engineering Company, Govan, Clyde. She was laid down on 21 September 1917 and was commissioned on 19 December 1918.

In 1919 L55 was sunk in the Baltic Sea by Bolshevik vessels while serving as part of the Allied intervention in the Russian Civil War. The submarine was raised in 1928 and repaired by the Soviets. After being used for training, she finally was scrapped in the 1950s.

== British service ==
HMS L55 was based at Tallinn, Estonia as part of the Baltic Battle Squadron, which was supporting the Baltic states fighting for independence. On 9 June 1919 in Caporsky Bay in the Gulf of Finland L55 attacked two 1,260-ton Bolshevik Orfey-class minelayer-destroyers, Gavriil and Azard. HMS L55 missed her targets and was forced into a British-laid minefield. Soviet sources stated Azard sank her by gunfire. If she was sunk by gunfire, L55 was the only British submarine sunk by hostile Soviet vessels.

== Salvage ==
The wreck was found by Soviet minesweepers in 1927. The Soviets raised her on 11 August 1928. As the Soviets refused to allow any British warship into their waters, the remains of the crew members were returned on the British merchantman Truro before transfer to HMS Champion. The crew, 42 officers and men, were buried in a communal grave at the Haslar Royal Naval Cemetery in Portsmouth on 7 September 1928.

== Soviet service ==
The boat was rebuilt by Baltic Works, Leningrad, the reconstruction cost of 1 million roubles being financed by a public fund as "an answer to Chamberlain". She was recommissioned as a Soviet submarine with the same number (Л-55) on 7 August 1931. She was later named Bezbozhnik ("Atheist") and was used as the basis of design for the Soviet L-class submarines. L55 was used for training until the beginning of World War II, when she was damaged in an accident in early 1941. She was scrapped in 1953 or possibly 1960.

== Bibliography ==
- О подъеме английской подводной лодки Л-55, потопленной в июне 1919 г. в Финском заливе // «Военно-исторический журнал», № 6, 1971. стр.119
- Budzbon, Przemysław & Radziemski, Jan (2020). "The Beginnings of Soviet Naval Power". In Jordan, John (ed.). Warship 2020. Oxford, UK: Osprey. pp. 82–101. ISBN 978-1-4728-4071-4.
- Hutchinson, Robert (2001). Jane's Submarines: War Beneath the Waves from 1776 to the Present Day. London: HarperCollins. ISBN 978-0-00-710558-8. OCLC 53783010.
