= Gavriil-class destroyer =

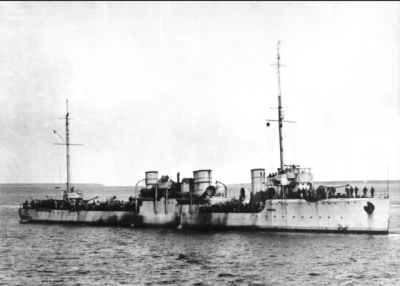
- Konstantin

Class overview
- Operators: Russian Navy; Soviet Navy
- Preceded by: Novik
- Succeeded by: Izyaslav class
- In commission: 1914–1956
- Planned: 6
- Completed: 3
- Canceled: 3
- Lost: 3

General characteristics (Konstantin as built)
- Type: Destroyer
- Displacement: 1,260 t (1,240 long tons)
- Length: 98 m (321 ft 6 in)
- Beam: 9.34 m (30 ft 8 in)
- Draught: 3.15 m (10 ft 4 in)
- Installed power: 4 Vulkan boilers; 30,000 PS (22,000 kW)
- Propulsion: 2 shafts, 2 steam turbines
- Speed: 31 knots (57 km/h; 36 mph)
- Range: 1,680 nmi (3,110 km; 1,930 mi) at 21 knots (39 km/h; 24 mph)
- Complement: 150
- Armament: 4 × single 102 mm (4 in) guns; 1 × 63 mm (2.5 in) AA gun; 2 × 7.62 mm (0.3 in) machine guns; 3 × triple 450 mm (17.7 in) torpedo tubes; 80 × naval mines

The Gavriil-class destroyers were built for the Baltic Fleet of the Imperial Russian Navy during World War I.

== Design and description ==
The Gavriil-class ships were designed as an improved version of the Derzky class. The ships normally displaced 1,360 tonnes (1,340 long tons) and 1,562–1,600 tonnes (1,537–1,575 long tons) at full load. They measured 98 meters (321 ft 6 in) long overall with a beam of 9.34 meters (30 ft 8 in), and a draft of 3.15 meters (10 ft 4 in). The Gavriils were propelled by two Curtis-AEG-Vulkan steam turbines, each driving one propeller shaft using steam from four Vulkan boilers at a working pressure of 17 standard atmospheres (1,723 kPa; 250 psi). The turbines were designed to produce a total of 30,000 shaft horsepower (22,000 kW) for an intended maximum speed of 35 knots (65 km/h; 40 mph). During their sea trials, they only reached 31.3–31.5 knots (58.0–58.3 km/h; 36.0–36.2 mph) from 30,954–33,609 shp (23,082–25,062 kW). The ships carried between 159–350 t (156–344 long tons) of fuel oil which gave them a range of 1,680 nautical miles (3,110 km; 1,930 mi) at 21 knots (39 km/h; 24 mph). Their crew numbered 150.

The Gavriil-class ships were originally intended to have an armament of two 60-caliber 102 mm (four in) Pattern 1911 Obukhov guns, one gun each on the forecastle and stern, and a dozen 450-millimeter (17.7 in) torpedo tubes in six double mounts. The Naval General Staff changed this to four triple mounts once they became available in 1914; based on a battle between the destroyer Novik and two German destroyers in August 1915, they decided to exchange the rearmost torpedo mount for two more 102 mm guns on the stern while the ships were still under construction. All of these guns were on the centerline and interfered with each other's movements. Anti-aircraft defense was provided by a 63 mm (2.5 in) anti-aircraft (AA) gun in a single mount amidships. The Gavriils were completed with one triple torpedo mount between the forward funnels and two mounts aft of the rear funnel. The ships could carry 80 M1912 naval mines. They were also fitted with a Barr and Stroud rangefinder and two 60-centimeter (24 in) searchlights.

== Ships ==
Built by Russo-Baltic Shipyard, Reval

Construction data
Ship	Name in Soviet service	Laid down	Launched	Completed	Fate
Gavriil	NA	8 December 1913	5 January 1915	7 October 1916	Helped sink British submarine L55 and three British motor boats. Sunk by mines 21 October 1919 together with sister ships Konstantin and Svoboda during an attempted sortie to support Red Army forces defending Petrograd against the advance of Yudenich's White forces. The accompanying Azard managed to manoeuvre out of the minefield but 485 men were lost.
Konstantin	NA	24 November 1913	5 August 1915	6 May 1917	Sunk by mines 21 October 1919 in the same operation as Gavril.
Vladimir	Svoboda	24 November 1913	18 August 1915	9 October 1917	Sunk by mines 21 October 1919 in the same operation as Gavril.
Mikhail	NA	15 November 1915	18 May 1916	Never	towed to Saint Petersburg, but broken up incomplete, 1923
Mechislav (ex-Leytenant Lombard)	NA	14 August 1915	3 September 1917	Never	towed to Saint Petersburg, but broken up incomplete, 1923
Sokol	NA	7 January 1915	4 June 1917	Never	towed to Saint Petersburg, but broken up incomplete, 1923

== Bibliography ==
- Apalkov, Yu. V. (1996). Боевые корабли русского флота: 8.1914-10.1917г [Combat Ships of the Russian Fleet: 8.1914-10.1917] (in Russian). ИНТЕК. ISBN 5-7559-0018-3.
- Berezhnoy, S. S. (2002). Крейсера и Миносцы: Справочик [Cruisers and Destroyers: Reference] (in Russian). Ввоенное Ииздательство. ISBN 5-203-01780-8.
- Budzbon, Przemysław (1985). "Russia". In Gray, Randal (ed.). Conway's All the World's Fighting Ships 1906–1921. Naval Institute Press. pp. 291–325. ISBN 0-85177-245-5.
- Budzbon, Przemysław (2026). "The High-Speed Destroyers of the Novik Type: Part I". In Jordan, John (ed.). Warship 2026. Osprey Publishing. pp. 8–29. ISBN 978-1-4728-7259-3.
- Budzbon, Przemysław; Radziemski, Jan & Twardowski, Marek (2022). Warships of the Soviet Fleets 1939–1945. Vol. I: Major Combatants. Naval Institute Press. ISBN 978-1-68247-877-6.
- Friedman, Norman (2011). Naval Weapons of World War One: Guns, Torpedoes, Mines and ASW Weapons of All Nations; An Illustrated Directory. Seaforth Publishing. ISBN 978-1-84832-100-7.
- Greger, René (1972). The Russian Fleet, 1914-1917. Ian Allan. ISBN 0-7110-0255-X.
- O'Hara, Vincent (2017). Clash of Fleets: Naval Battles of the Great War, 1914-18. Naval Institute Press. ISBN 978-1-68247-008-4.
- Platonov, Andrey V. (2002). Энциклопедия советских надводных кораблей 1941–1945 [Encyclopedia of Soviet Surface Ships 1941–1945] (in Russian). Poligon. ISBN 5-89173-178-9.
- Rohwer, Jürgen (2005). Chronology of the War at Sea 1939–1945: The Naval History of World War Two (Third Revised ed.). Naval Institute Press. ISBN 1-59114-119-2.
- Staff, Gary (2009). Battle for the Baltic Islands 1917: Triumph of the Imperial German Navy. Pen and Sword Maritime. ISBN 978-1-84415-787-7.
- Verstyuk, Anatoly & Gordeyev, Stanislav (2006). Корабли Минных дивизий. От "Новика" до "Гогланда" [Torpedo Division Ships: From Novik to Gogland] (in Russian). Voennaya Kniga. ISBN 5-902863-10-4.
