= Mikhail Sablin =

Mikhail Pavlovich Sablin
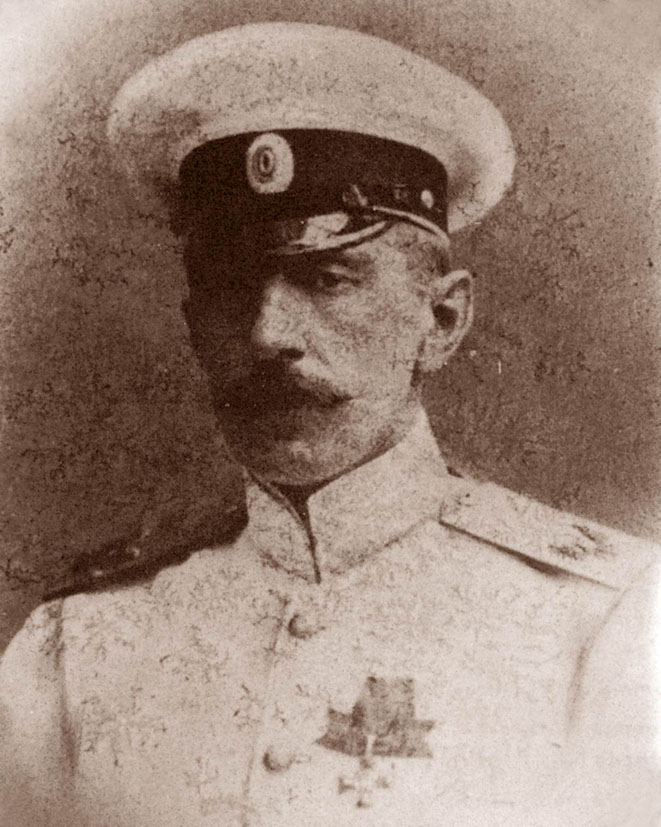
- Admiral Sablin in 1917–18
- Born: June 18, 1869; Sevastopol, Russian Empire
- Died: October 17, 1920 (aged 51) Yalta, Government of South Russia
- Allegiance: Russian Empire; Ukrainian People's Republic (Russia) White Movement
- Branch: Imperial Russian Navy; Ukrainian People's Republic Navy (Russia) Black Sea Fleet (White Movement)
- Service years: 1890–1920
- Rank: Admiral
- Commands: Rostislav; Black Sea Fleet
- Conflicts: Russo-Japanese War; World War I Russian Civil War
- Awards: Order of St. George 4th Class

Mikhail Pavlovich Sablin (Russian: Михаил Павлович Саблин, Ukrainian: Миха́йло Па́влович Са́блін) (June 17, 1869 – October 17, 1920), was an admiral in the Imperial Russian Navy, commander of the first independent Ukrainian Navy and a member of the White Russian Movement.

== Biography ==
Sablin was born into a naval family in Sevastopol, his father was Vice Admiral Pavel Sablin and his brother Nikolai Pavlovich Sablin was also a naval officer.

Sablin graduated from the Sea Cadet Corps in Petrograd during 1890 and was assigned to the Russian Black Sea Fleet. He was later posted to China where he participated in the suppression of the Boxer Rebellion. During the Russo-Japanese War of 1904–1905, he was an officer on the battleship Oslyabya, and survived the sinking of this ship during the Battle of Tsushima.

After repatriation to Russia at the end of the war, he again served with the Black Sea Fleet, commanding a destroyer and a gunboat before being given the command of the battleship Rostislav in 1912.

During World War I Sablin commanded the cruiser squadron of the Black Sea Fleet, and took part in numerous combat actions against the Imperial German Navy and Ottoman Navy, for which he was awarded the Order of Saint George for his valour. He was promoted to Chief of Staff of the Black Sea Fleet in 1917.

After the Russian Revolution Sablin took command of the Black Sea Fleet early in 1918. He raised the colours of the Ukrainian National Republic on 29 April 1918. In May 1918 the Germans invaded the Crimea and Sablin moved a portion of his fleet (two battleships and fourteen destroyers) to Novorossiysk in order to save it from capture. He was ordered to scuttle his ships by Lenin but refused to do so, travelling to Moscow in order to plead his case. Sablin was arrested and imprisoned by the Bolsheviks but escaped in August 1918 and made his way via the United Kingdom to join Pavlo Skoropadskyi's anti-Bolshevik forces in the Crimea. Sablin commanded the naval forces of the White Movement, but was invalided out due to ill health in 1920. He died of liver cancer in Yalta on October 17 and was buried in Sevastopol.
