= Sablin, Kursk Oblast =

Rural locality in Kursk Oblast, Russia

Sablin Саблин
- Khutor
- Interactive map of Sablin
- Location of Sablin Sablin (Kursk Oblast)
- Coordinates: 51°46′47″N 36°14′49″E
- Country: Russia
- Federal subject: Kursk Oblast
- Administrative district: Kursky District
- SelsovietSelsoviet: Shchetinsky

Population (2010 Census)
  - Total: 77
  - Estimate (2010): 77 (0%)

Municipal status
  - Municipal district: Kursky Municipal District
  - Rural settlement: Shchetinsky Selsoviet Rural Settlement
- Time zone: UTC+3 (MSK)
- Postal code: 305511
- Dialing code: +7 4712
- OKTMO ID: 38620492121
- Website: shetin.rkursk.ru

Sablin (Russian: Саблин) is a rural locality (a khutor) in Shchetinsky Selsoviet Rural Settlement, Kursky District, Kursk Oblast, Russia. Population: 77 (2010 census); 57 (2002 census);

== Geography ==
The khutor is located 98 km from the Russia–Ukraine border, at the north-eastern border of the district center – the town Kursk, at the south-eastern border of the selsoviet center – Shchetinka.

Streets

There are the following streets in the locality: Moskovskaya and Tsentralnaya (48 houses).

Climate

Sablin has a warm-summer humid continental climate (Dfb in the Köppen climate classification).

== Transport ==
Sablin is located 6 km from the federal route P-298 (Kursk – Voronezh – P-22 "Kaspy" Highway; a part of the European route E38), 1 km from the road of regional importance 38K-018 (Kursk – Ponyri), 0.2 km from the nearest railway halt 4 km (railway line Kursk – 146 km).

The rural locality is situated 3 km from Kursk Vostochny Airport, 127 km from Belgorod International Airport and 205 km from Voronezh Peter the Great Airport.
