= Russian yacht Standart =

Russian imperial yacht of Nicolas II

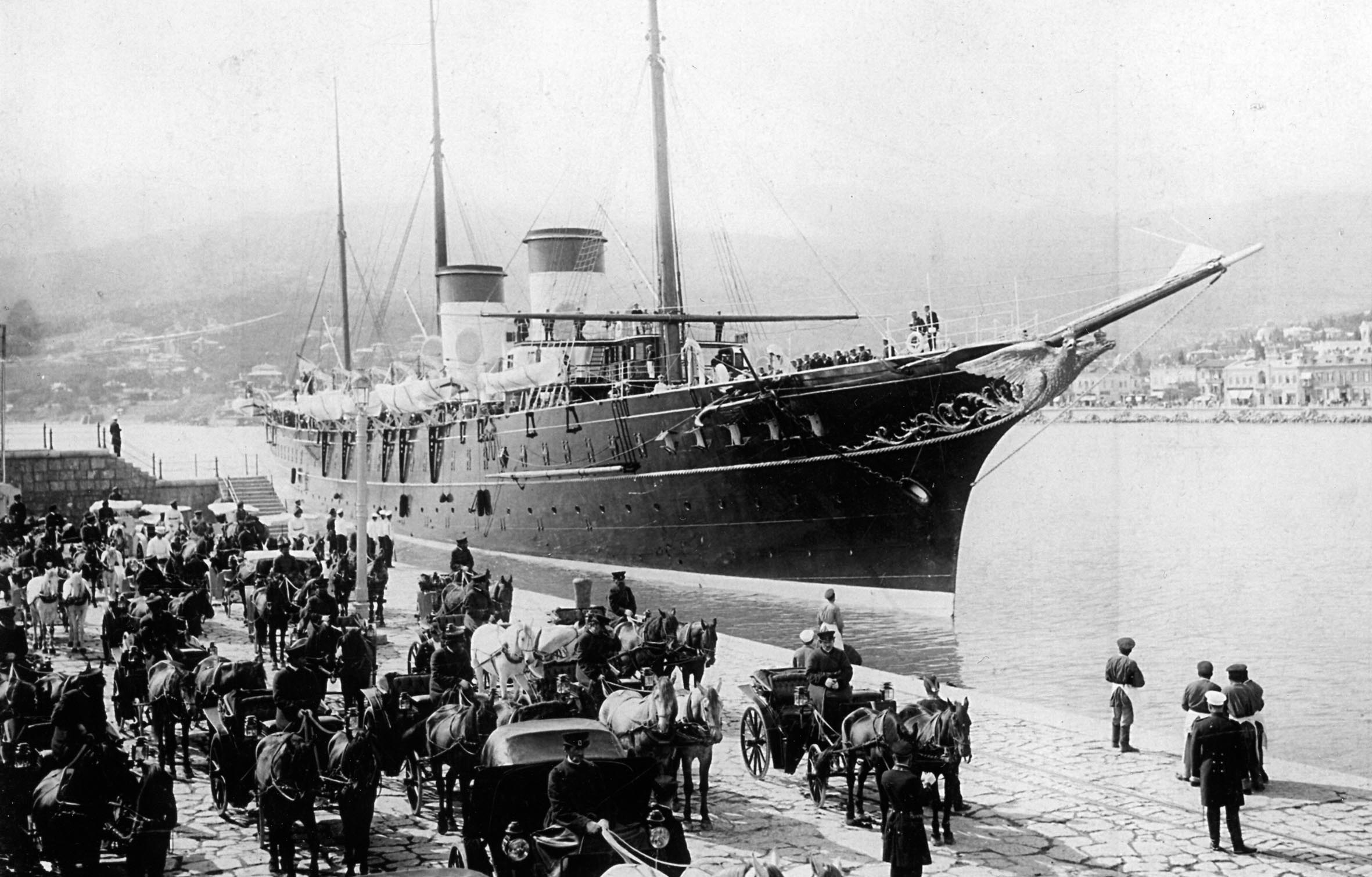
- Standart arriving at Yalta, Crimea

History

Russian Empire
- Name: Standart
- Namesake: Emperor's Naval Standard
- Owner: Imperial Russian Navy
- Ordered: 19 June 1893
- Builder: Burmeister & Wain, Copenhagen, Denmark
- Yard number: 183
- Laid down: 1 October 1893
- Launched: 10 March 1895
- Commissioned: September 1896
- Decommissioned: 1918

Soviet Union
- Name: Marti
- Owner: Soviet Navy
- Reinstated: 1936 (as minelayer)
- Fate: Scrapped, 1963

General characteristics (as royal yacht)
- Displacement: 5557 tons standard
- Length: 128 m (420 ft)
- Beam: 15.8 m (52 ft)
- Draught: 6.00 m (19 ft 8 in)
- Propulsion: 2 Triple Expansion Steam Engines
- Speed: 21.18 knots
- Complement: 355
- Armament: 8 – 47 mm (1.9 in) guns (Hotchkiss)

General characteristics (as Marti)
- Displacement: 5665 tons standard, 6198 tons deep load
- Length: 122.30 m (401 ft 3 in)
- Beam: 14.4 m (47 ft 3 in)
- Draught: 6.80 m (22 ft 4 in)
- Propulsion: 2 shaft, 2 Triple Expansion Steam Engines, 4 boilers
- Speed: 18,85 knots
- Complement: 400
- Armament: 4 × 130 mm (5.1 in) guns (4x1); 7 × 76.2 mm (3.00 in) guns (7x1); 3 × 45 mm (1.8 in) guns (3x1); 3 × 12.7 mm (0.50 in) machine guns (3x1); 320 mines

The Standart was an Imperial Russian yacht serving Emperor Nicholas II and his family, being in her time (late 19th/early 20th century), the largest imperial yacht afloat. After the Russian Revolution, the ship was placed in drydock until 1936, when she was converted to a minelayer. During World War II, she participated in the defence of Leningrad.

== History ==
=== Imperial yacht ===
The imperial yacht Standart (Штандартъ) was built by order of Emperor Alexander III of Russia, and constructed at the Danish shipyard of Burmeister & Wain, beginning in 1893. She was launched on 21 March 1895 and came into service early September 1896.

Standart was fitted out with ornate fixtures, including mahogany paneling, crystal chandeliers, and other amenities that made the vessel a suitable floating palace for the Russian imperial family. The ship was crewed by sailors from the Russian Imperial Navy. During the reign of Nicholas II, Standart was commanded by a naval captain, although the official commander was a rear admiral. Her commander in 1914 was Nikolai Pavlovich Sablin.

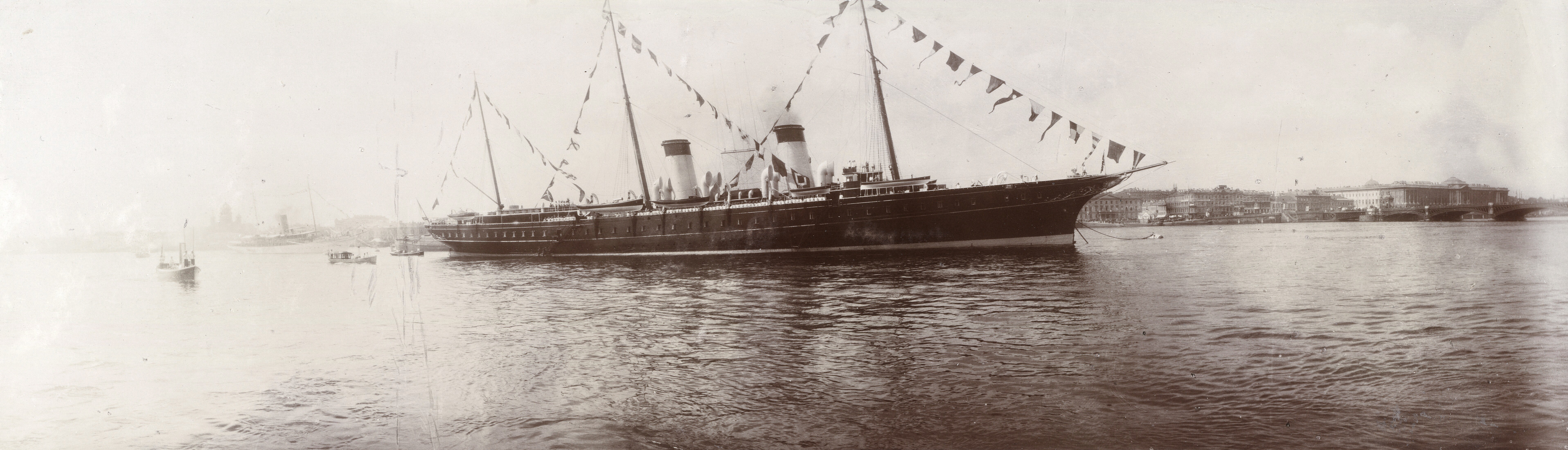
Standart in 1909

On October the 9th 1904 (gregorian Calendar) while the yacht was in Reval (Tallinn) the Tsar hosted a dinner for the admirals and captains of the Baltic fleet 2 days before their departure to the Pacific which would end in the Battle of Tsushima. On 29 August 1907, Standart ran aground on an uncharted rock off the Finnish coast close to the Riilahti Manor. Although damaged, the ship did not sink. She was refloated on 1 September with assistance from the icebreaker No. 1. Subsequently, it was repaired and returned to service.

In 1912, Emperors Nicholas II of Russia and Wilhelm II of Germany met on the yacht at Baltiski ( Paldiski ) naval harbour for negotiations. With the outbreak of World War I, Standart was placed in drydock.

=== Soviet minelayer Marti ===
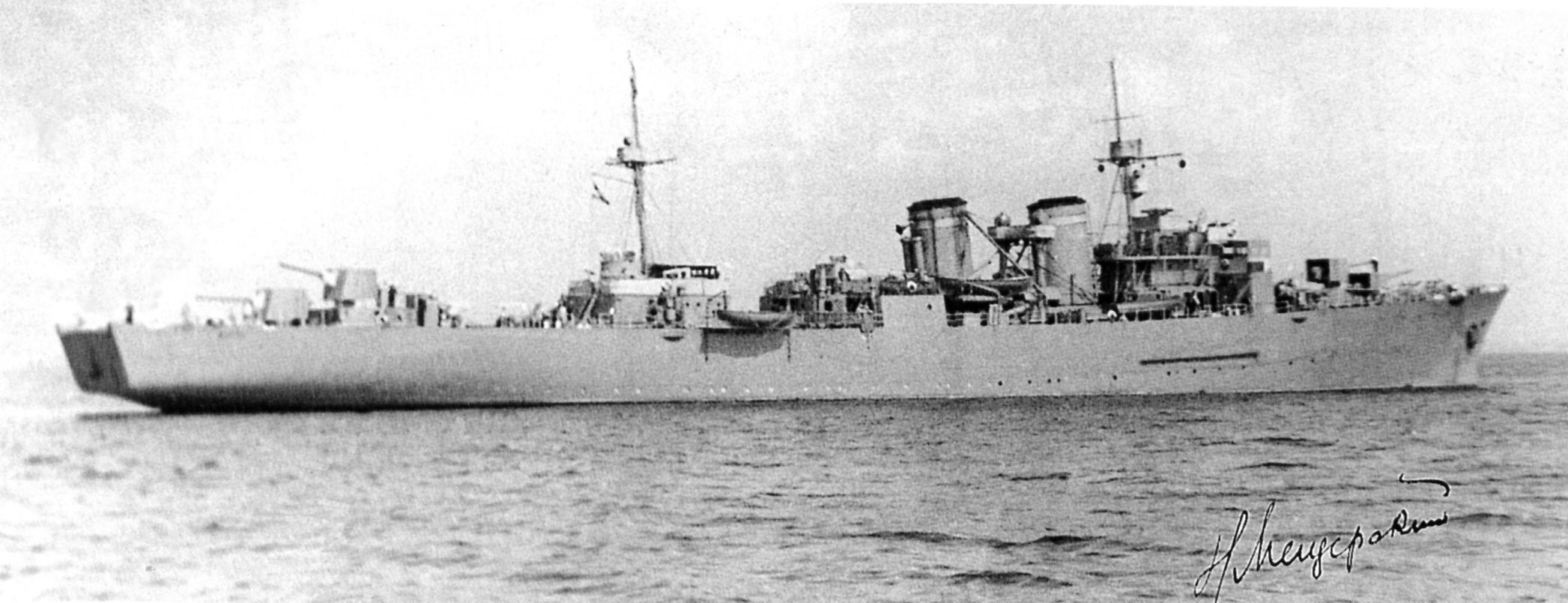
Minelayer Marti in 1942

After the fall of the Romanov dynasty, Standart was stripped down and pressed into naval service. The ship was renamed 18 marta (18 March), and later Marti (in honor of André Marty). In 1932–1936, Marti was converted into a minelayer by the Marti yard in Leningrad. During the Second World War, Marti served in the Baltic, laying mines and bombarding shore positions along the coast. On 23 September 1941, Marti was damaged in an air attack at Kronstadt, but later repaired and continued service until the end of the war. A mine laid off Hanko by Marti sunk the German submarine chaser UJ.117/Gustav Kroner on 1 October 1941.

After the war, Marti was converted into a training ship and renamed Oka in 1957. She continued serving in that role until she was scrapped at Tallinn, Estonia, in 1963.

== Specifications ==
- Displacement: 5557 tons
- Length: 370 feet (110 m) between perpendiculars
- Length Overall: 420 feet (130 m)
- Width: 50 feet 8 inches (15.44 m)
- Depth: 20 feet (6.1 m)
- Maximum Speed: 21.18 knots

== Previous imperial yachts ==
- Alexandria (Александрия)
- Livadia
- Polyarnaya zvezda (Polar Star – Полярная звезда)
