= Russian destroyer Novik =

1911 Russian destroyer

Coordinates: 59°39′44″N 25°31′40″E

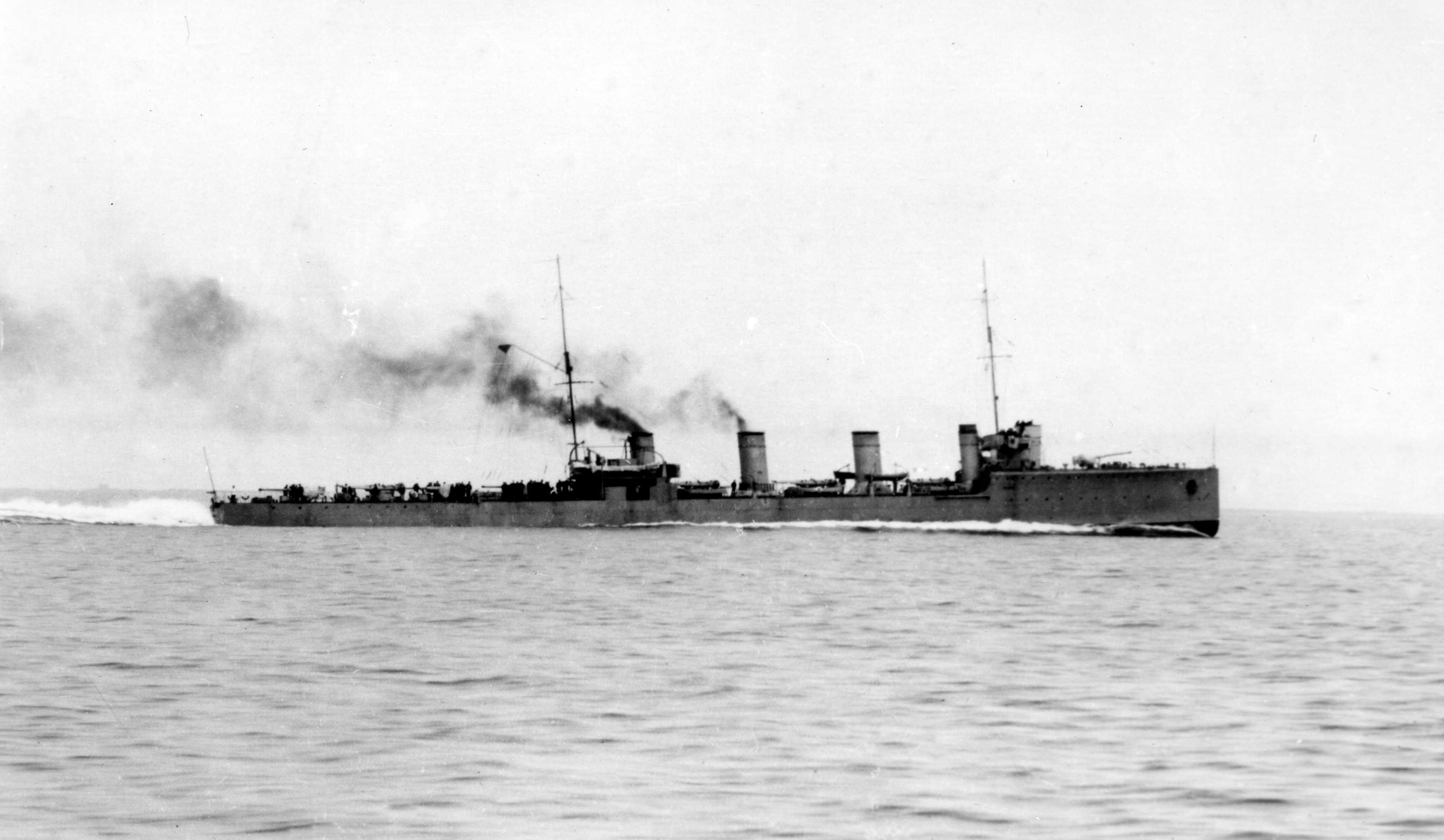
- Novik as originally completed

History

Russian Empire
- Name: Novík
- Builder: Putilovsky Plant, St. Petersburg
- Laid down: 1 July 1910
- Launched: 4 July 1911
- Commissioned: 9 September 1913
- Fate: Joined the Bolsheviks, November 1917

Soviet Union
- Name: Yakov Sverdlov
- Namesake: Yakov Sverdlov
- Builder: Putilovsky Plant, St. Petersburg
- Acquired: November 1917
- Out of service: 9 September 1918–1925
- Renamed: 1923
- Reclassified: 23 April 1940 as training ship
- Refit: 28 November 1937–8 December 1940
- Reinstated: 23 June 1941
- Fate: Sunk by a German mine on 28 August 1941

General characteristics
- Type: Destroyer
- Displacement: 1,260 long tons (1,280 t) (normal); 1,590 long tons (1,620 t)
- Length: 102.4 m (335 ft 11 in)
- Beam: 9.5 m (31 ft 2 in)
- Draught: 7.2 m (23 ft 7 in)
- Installed power: 6 water-tube boilers; 39,000 shp (29,000 kW)
- Propulsion: 3 shafts, steam turbines
- Speed: 37.3 knots (69.1 km/h; 42.9 mph) (trials)
- Range: 2,000 nmi (3,700 km) at 21 knots (39 km/h; 24 mph)
- Complement: 142 men
- Armament: 4 × single 102 mm (4.0 in) guns; 4 × twin 457 mm (18.0 in) torpedo tubes; 60 mines

General characteristics after 1929 rebuild
- Type: Destroyer
- Displacement: 1,597 tonnes (1,572 long tons; 1,760 short tons)
- Length: 102.4 m (335 ft 11 in)
- Beam: 9.5 m (31 ft 2 in)
- Draught: 3.5 m (11 ft 6 in)
- Propulsion: 3 shaft AEG-Vulcan turbines; 6 Vulcan boilers; 40,000 shp (30,000 kW)
- Speed: 32 knots (59 km/h; 37 mph)
- Endurance: 1,800 nmi (3,330 km) at 12 knots (22 km/h)
- Complement: 168 men
- Sensors & processing systems: Arktur (SPS) sonar; Gradus-K radio direction finder
- Armament: 4 × 1 – 102 mm (4.0 in) guns; 1 × 1 – 76.2 mm (3.00 in) AA gun; 3 × 3 – 450 mm (18 in) torpedo tubes; 50 mines

Novík was a destroyer of the Russian Imperial Navy and Soviet Navy, commissioned in 1913 where she served with the Baltic Fleet during World War I. She joined the Bolsheviks in November 1917 and was renamed Yakov Sverdlov in 1923. She was a training ship when Operation Barbarossa began, but was recalled to active duty the following day. She struck a mine on 28 August 1941 and sank while escorting an evacuation convoy during the Soviet evacuation of Tallinn.

== Construction ==
The first ship of its class, Novik was completed in 1910 at the Putilovsky Plant. She was originally designed by AG Vulcan Stettin. The class included 52 other ships in six groups:

- Derzky class
- Orfey class
- Leytenant Ilin class
- Gavriil class
- Izyaslav class
- Fidonisy class

Novik was one of the best ships of the type during the First World War. Novik -class ships were the first destroyers to be powered by oil instead of coal. When first commissioned she was the fastest ship in the world.

== World War I ==
During the night of 6/7 May 1915 Novik, in company with ten other destroyers, mined the approaches to the port of Liepāja which was being attacked by the Germans. There was an inconclusive encounter between cruisers of the Russian covering force and the German light cruiser SMS München, but the destroyers were undetected. One of the mines laid that night blew off the bow of the new V 107 when she entered Liepāja on the morning of 8 May and rendered her unrepairable. Novik escorted the armored cruiser Rurik on a mission to shell the German port of Memel, but they became separated from the rest of the force in heavy fog and encountered the German armored cruiser SMS Roon. Rurik opened fire, but was soon forced to turn away by a (false) submarine contact and lost sight of the Germans. During the Battle of the Gulf of Riga in August 1915, Novik and three other destroyers set the V 99 on fire. V 99 struck two mines while attempting to break out of the Gulf and was sunk. During the night of 19/20 November 1915 Novik led seven Russian destroyers to attack German patrols off Windau. They sank the auxiliary patrol boat Norburg and escaped before German reinforcements could arrive. On the night of 13 May 1916, she led two of her half-sisters in search of German iron ore convoys sailing along the Swedish coast. They found a convoy of ten freighters escorted by four auxiliary patrol boats near Häfringe Island. The freighters fled for Swedish waters while the escorts turned to engage the Russians. The Russians sank the auxiliary cruiser Hermann, even though they refused to close the escorts believing them to be far stronger than they actually were, but the freighters escaped and no other damage was inflicted. On 26 June 1916, she ran aground off Naissaar. She was refloated with assistance from the Russian icebreaker Petr Veliky, which towed her in to Helsinki, Grand Duchy of Finland. Repairs took until 13 August to complete.

On 26 October 1917 Novik's crew joined the Bolsheviks, although nothing is known of her activities, if any, under their control during World War I.

== Rebuilding ==
She was laid up from 9 September 1918 until 1925 when she was extensively rebuilt between 26 September 1925 and 30 August 1929. Her rearmost set of twin torpedo tubes was removed, the three 102 mm (4.0 in) guns on the quarterdeck were moved forward and a 76.2 mm (3 in) "Lender" anti-aircraft gun was mounted at the very rear of the quarterdeck, which seriously obscured the arc of fire of the rear 102 mm gun. The three remaining twin sets of torpedo tubes were exchanged for triple launchers and re-positioned, a net increase of one torpedo tube. The bridge structure was enlarged and the deckhouse immediately aft of the fourth funnel was removed and a new, larger deckhouse was added about 9 metres (30 ft) aft of the fourth funnel. The masts were re-positioned and reinforced with supporting legs while the forward funnel was heightened by 2 metres (6.6 ft).

She was overhauled between 28 November 1937 and 8 December 1940, although what exactly this involved is not clear. She probably had her machinery overhauled or replaced and between two and four single 45 mm (1.8 in) 21-K anti-aircraft guns were installed. Before her refit was completed, however, she was re-designated as a training ship on 23 April 1940.

== World War II ==
At the start of the war, she was reassigned to the Third Destroyer Division of the Baltic Fleet. During the evacuation of the Soviet Navy from Tallinn to Kronstadt during Operation Barbarossa, Yakov Sverdlov was assigned as an escort to the flagship Kirov. During the operation, she hit a mine and sank near Cape Juminda on 28 August 1941. The wreck was located and identified on 16 June 2018; lying at a depth of 75 meters (246 ft), the ship is broken into two pieces.

== Bibliography ==
- Apalkov, Yu. V. (1996). Боевые корабли русского флота: 8.1914-10.1917г [Combat Ships of the Russian Fleet: 8.1914-10.1917] (in Russian). ИНТЕК. ISBN 5-7559-0018-3.
- Berezhnoy, S. S. (2002). Крейсера и Миносцы: Справочик [Cruisers and Destroyers: Reference] (in Russian). Moscow: Ввоенное Ииздательство. ISBN 5-203-01780-8.
- Breyer, Siegfried (1992). Soviet Warship Development: Volume 1: 1917–1937. Conway Maritime Press. ISBN 0-85177-604-3.
- Budzbon, Przemysław (2026). "The High-Speed Destroyers of the Novik Type: Part I". In Jordan, John (ed.). Warship 2026. Osprey Publishing. pp. 8–29. ISBN 978-1-4728-7259-3.
- Budzbon, Przemysław (1985). "Russia". In Gray, Randal (ed.). Conway's All the World's Fighting Ships 1906–1921. Naval Institute Press. pp. 291–325. ISBN 0-85177-245-5.
- Budzbon, Przemysław (1980). "Soviet Union". In Chesneau, Roger (ed.). Conway's All the World's Fighting Ships 1922–1946. Conway Maritime Press. pp. 318–346. ISBN 0-85177-146-7.
- Budzbon, Przemysław; Radziemski, Jan & Twardowski, Marek (2022). Warships of the Soviet Fleets 1939–1945. Vol. I: Major Combatants. Naval Institute Press. ISBN 978-1-68247-877-6.
- Campbell, John (1985). Naval Weapons of World War II. Naval Institute Press. ISBN 0-87021-459-4.
- Chernyshev, Alexander (2011). Русские суперэсминцы. Легендарные "Новики" [Russian Superdestroyers: Legendary Noviks] (in Russian) (2nd ed.). Yauza/Eksmo. ISBN 978-5-699-53144-8.
- Friedman, Norman (2011). Naval Weapons of World War One: Guns, Torpedoes, Mines and ASW Weapons of All Nations; An Illustrated Directory. Seaforth Publishing. ISBN 978-1-84832-100-7.
- Greger, René (1972). The Russian Fleet, 1914-1917. Ian Allan. ISBN 0-7110-0255-X.
- Halpern, Paul G. (1994). A Naval History of World War I. Naval Institute Press. ISBN 0-87021-266-4.
- Harris, Mark (2025). The First World War in the Baltic Sea. Vol. 1: Essen's Triumph, 1914 to February 1915. Helion. ISBN 978-1-804519-10-3.
- Hill, Alexander (2018). Soviet Destroyers of World War II. New Vanguard. Vol. 256. Osprey Publishing. ISBN 978-1-4728-2256-7.
- Platonov, Andrey V. (2002). Энциклопедия советских надводных кораблей 1941–1945 [Encyclopedia of Soviet Surface Ships 1941–1945] (in Russian). Poligon. ISBN 5-89173-178-9.
- Rohwer, Jürgen (2005). Chronology of the War at Sea 1939–1945: The Naval History of World War Two (Third Revised ed.). Naval Institute Press. ISBN 1-59114-119-2.
- Staff, Gary (2009). Battle for the Baltic Islands 1917: Triumph of the Imperial German Navy. Pen and Sword Maritime. ISBN 978-1-84415-787-7.
- Verstyuk, Anatoly & Gordeyev, Stanislav (2006). Корабли Минных дивизий. От "Новика" до "Гогланда" [Torpedo Division Ships: From Novik to Gogland] (in Russian). Voennaya Kniga. ISBN 5-902863-10-4.
- Watts, Anthony J. (1990). The Imperial Russian Navy. Arms and Armour. ISBN 0-85368-912-1.
