= Krasnaya Gorka fort =

Coastal artillery fortress in Russia

Coordinates: 59.972°N 29.333°E

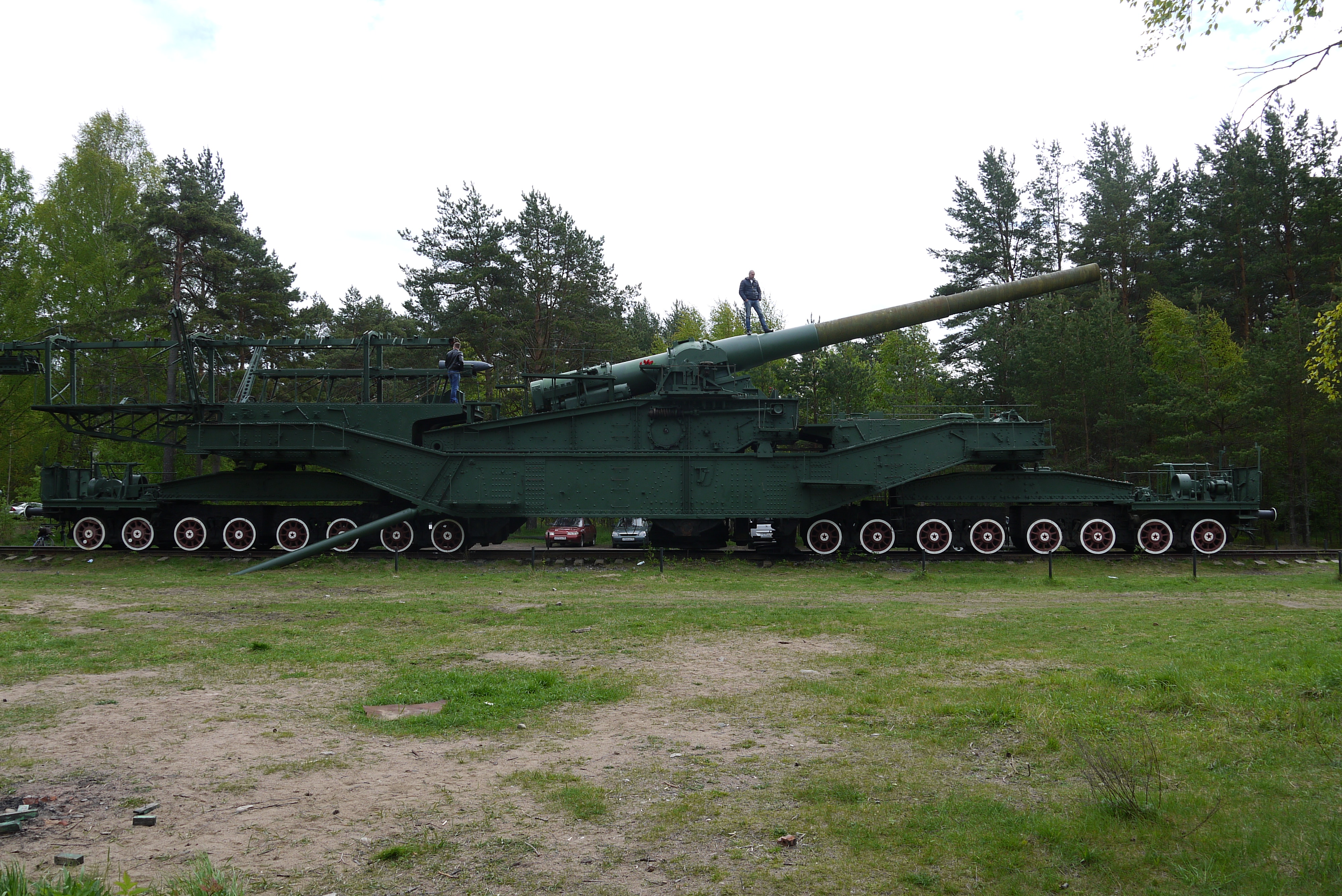
305-mm railroad gun in Krasnaya Gorka fort

Krasnaya Gorka (Russian: Красная Горка; meaning "Red Hill") is a coastal artillery fortress in Lomonosovsky District, Leningrad Oblast, Russia. It is located on the southern shore of the Gulf of Finland, opposite Kotlin Island and the Baltic Fleet's base at Kronstadt.

== History ==
The fort was established in the 18th century and substantially modernised in the late 19th – early 20th century with the installation of 12 inch guns in concrete casemates. There is an outlying fort called Seraya Loshad (Grey Horse) containing smaller guns.

The work was completed in 1914.

During the Russian Civil War the fort helped defend the city of Petrograd. In June 1919 the garrison mutinied against the Bolshevik government but the revolt was suppressed. Although the Estonian Army and the British Royal Navy actively supported the White Russian Northern Corps in the area, their attacks were not able to aid the mutineers.

Later in autumn 1919 the forts were unsuccessfully attacked by the 1st Division of the Estonian Army, supported by bombardment by HMS Erebus. In 1921 the guns of the fort bombarded Kronstadt during the rebellion. During World War II the fort played a vital part in defending the Siege of Leningrad and maintaining the Oranienbaum Bridgehead. The fort was decommissioned in 1960 and partially demolished.

== Gallery ==
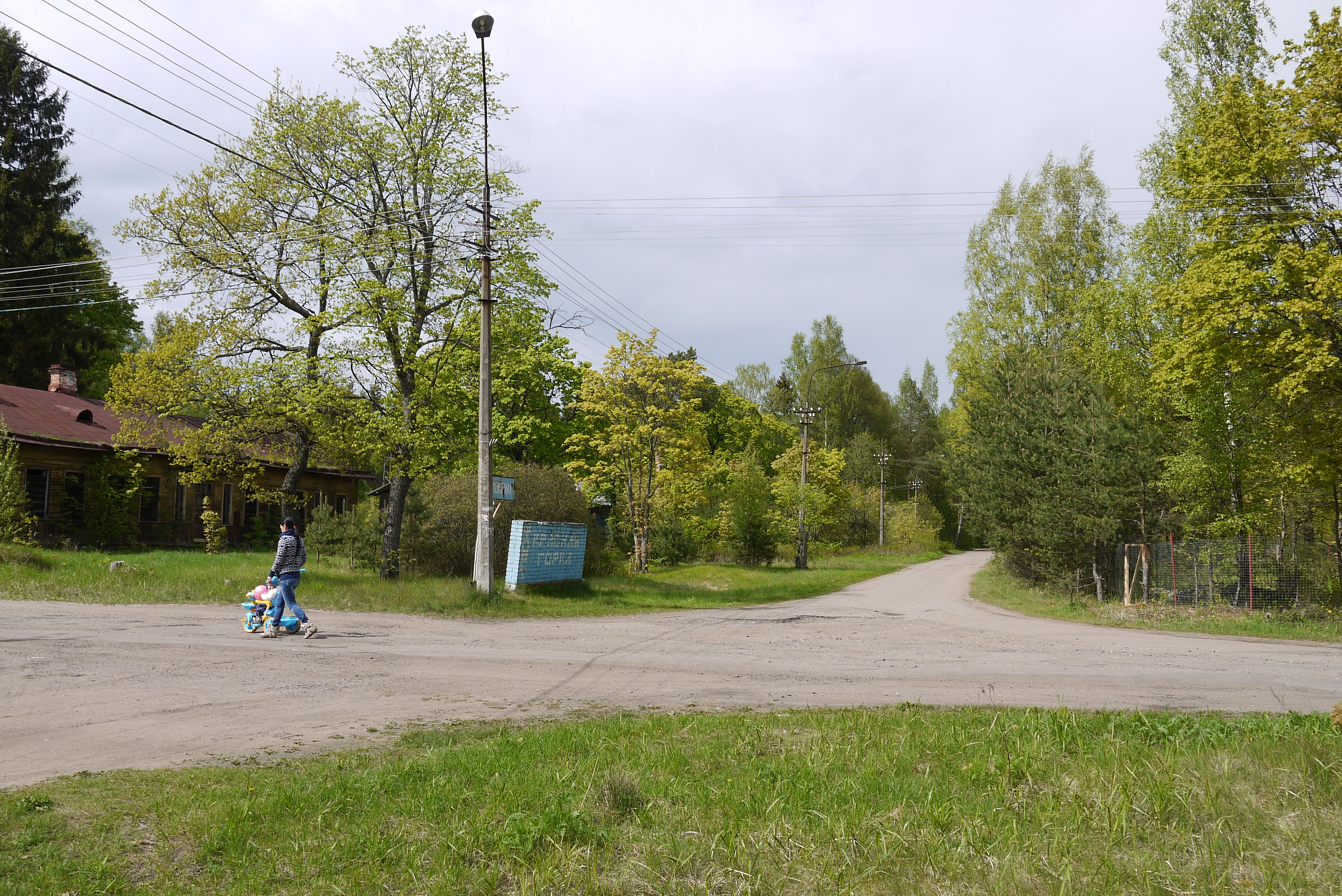
Entrance to Krasnaya Gorka fort

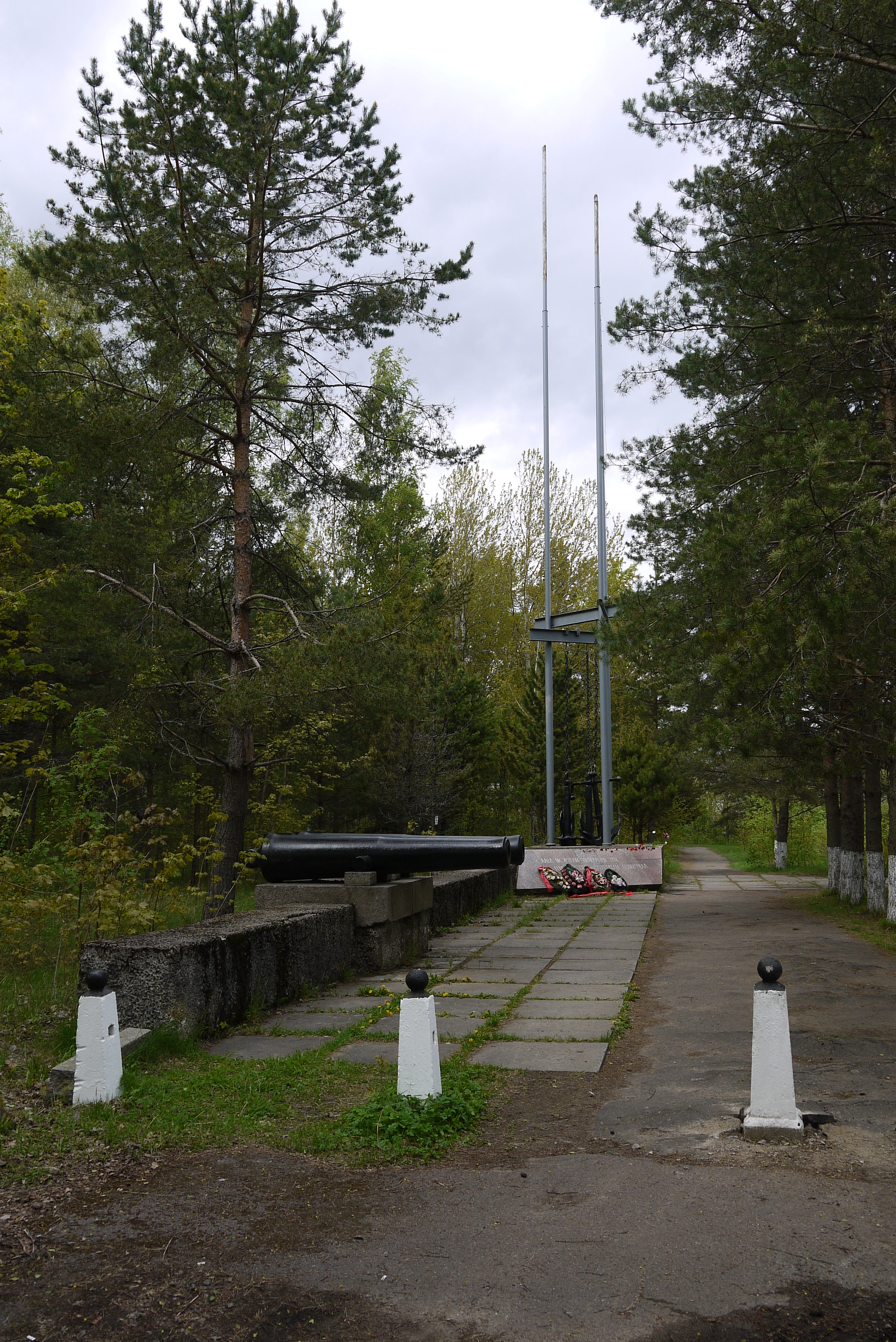
Memorial at Krasnaya Gorka fort

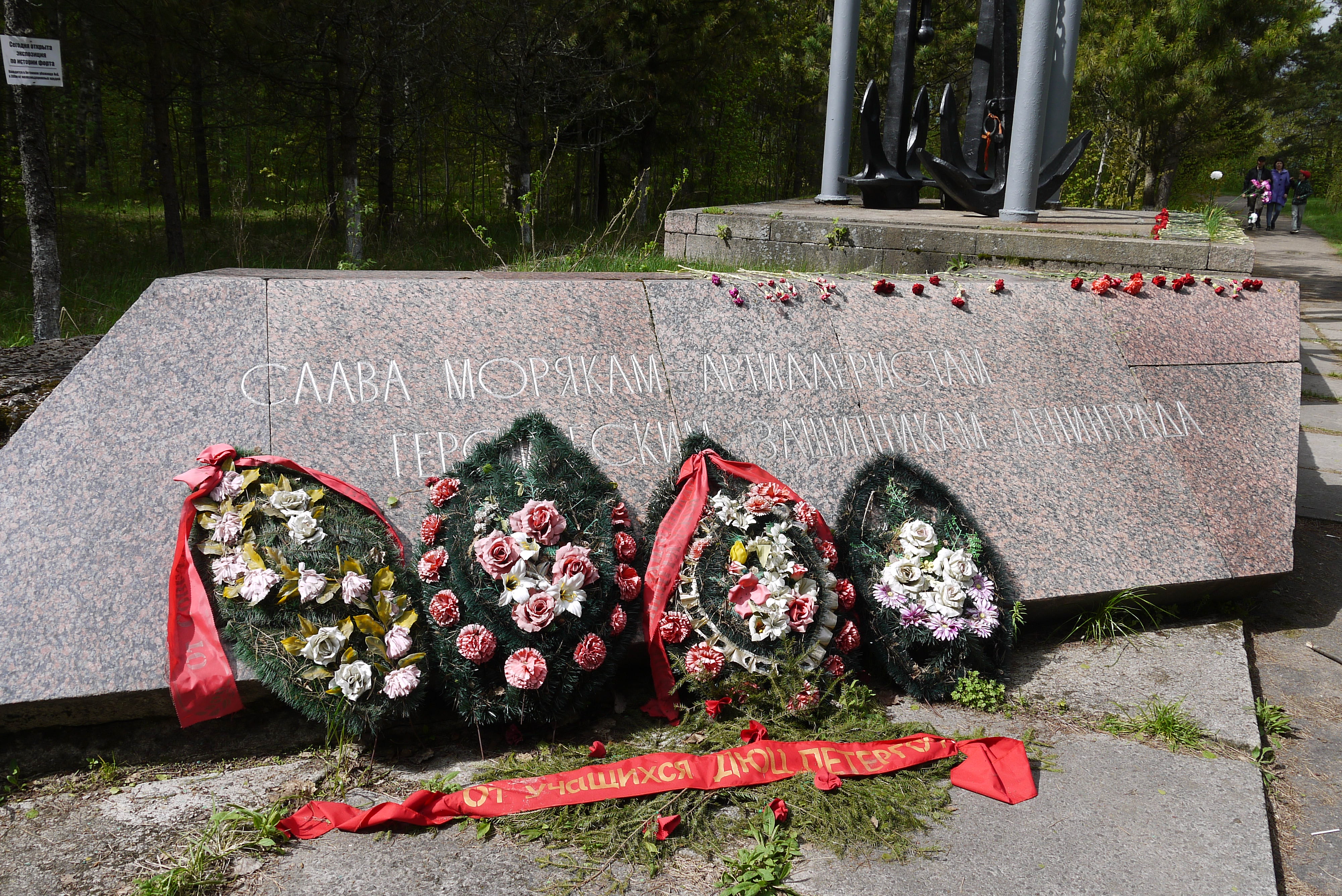
Memorial at Krasnaya Gorka fort

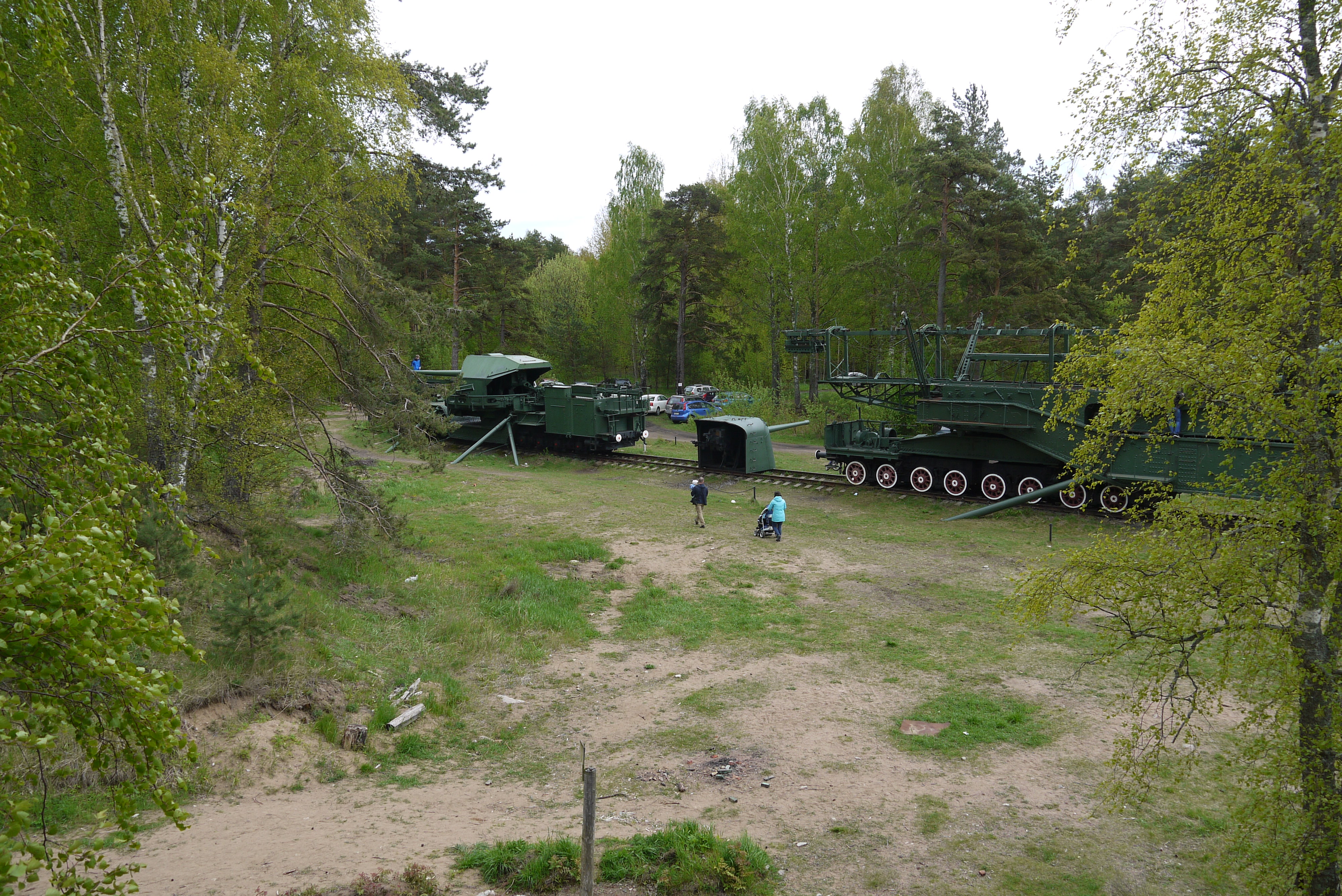
TM-1-180 Railway Gun, Krasnaya Gorka fort

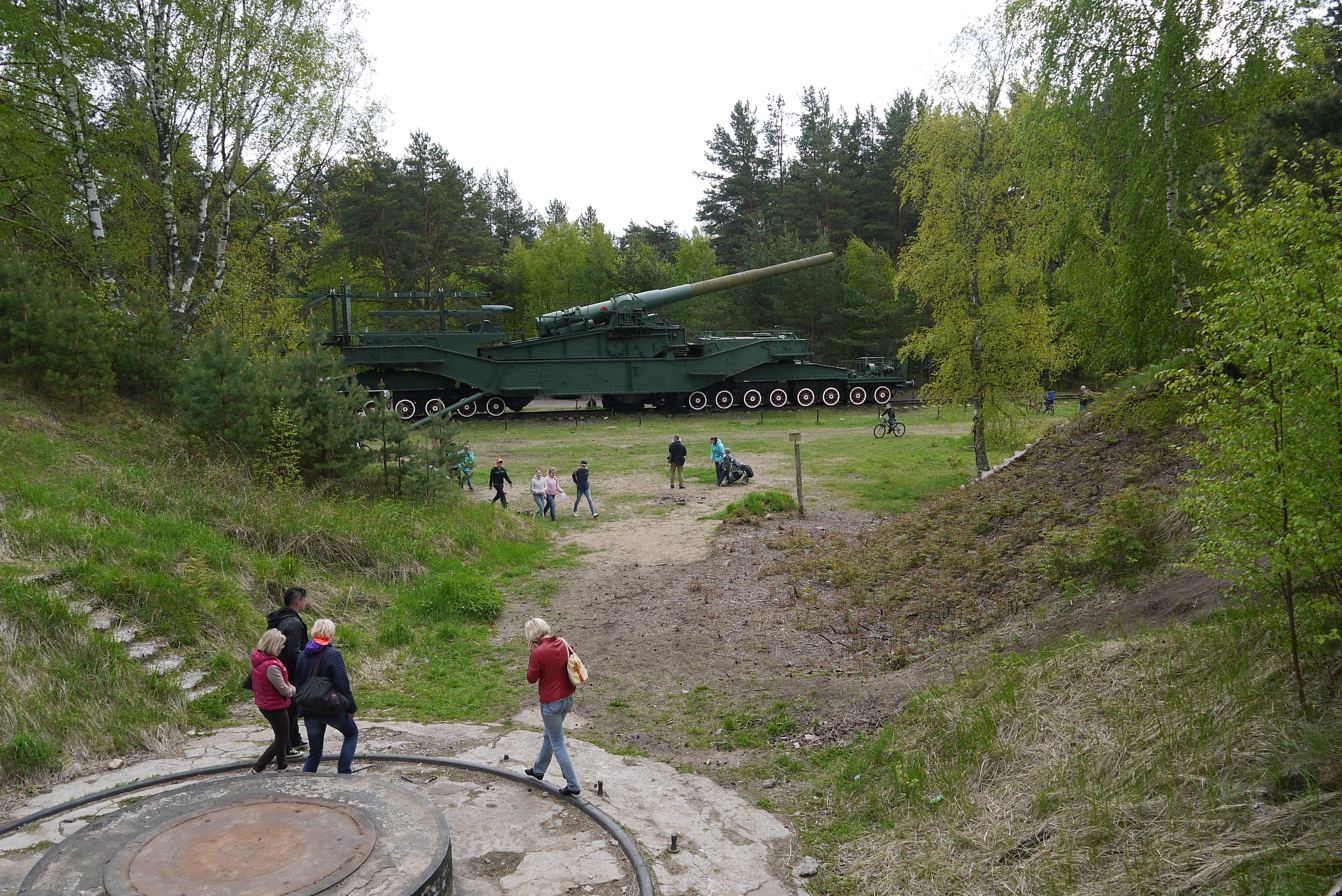
TM-3-12 Railway Gun, Krasnaya Gorka fort

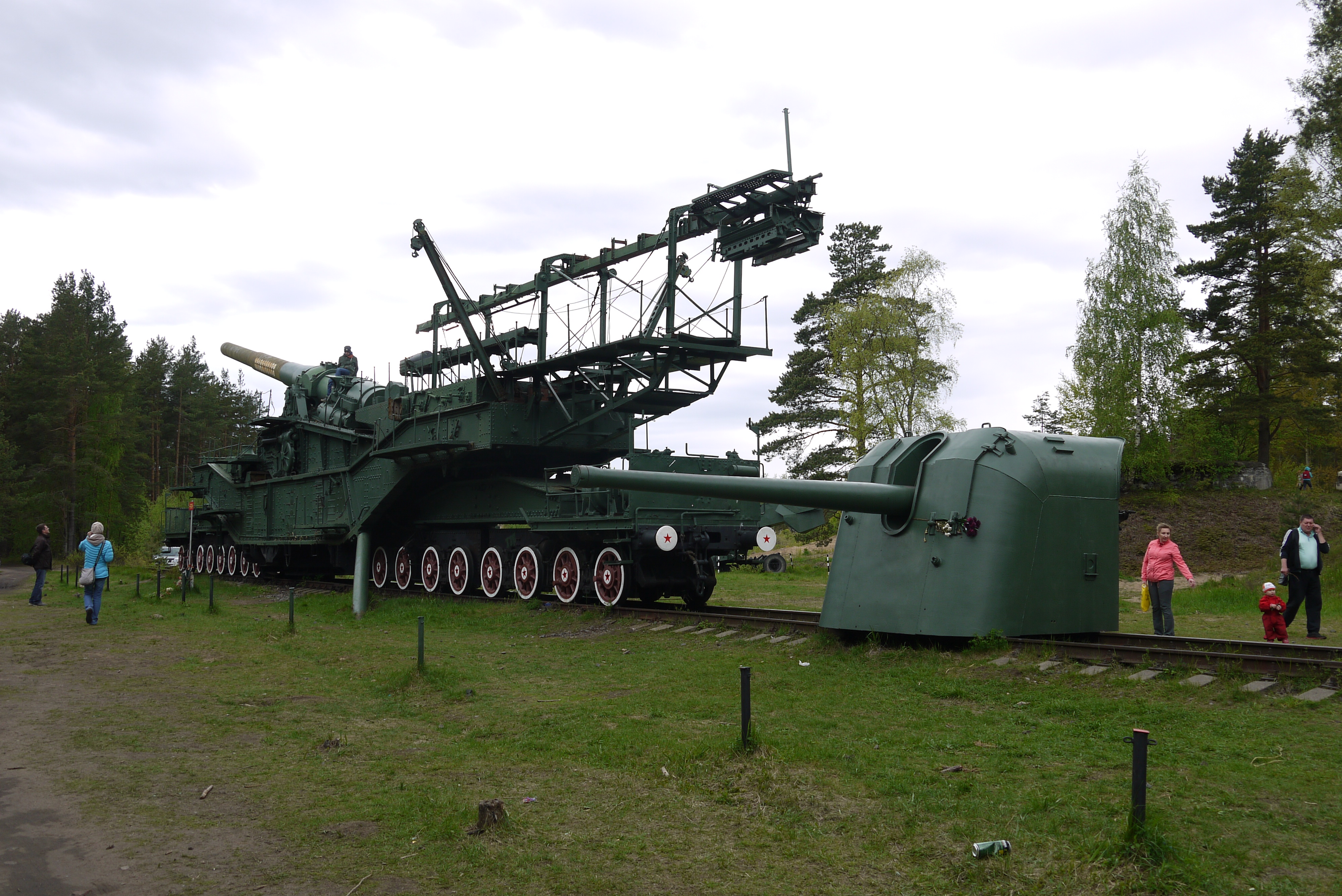
TM-3-12 Railway Gun, Krasnaya Gorka fort

== See also ==
- Fort Ino
