= Nikolai Pavlovich Sablin =

Russian naval captain (1880–1937)

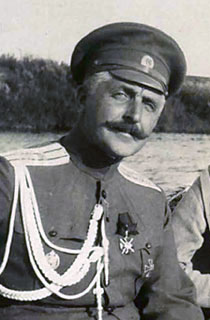
- Born: April 16, 1880; Mykolaiv, Russian Empire
- Died: August 21, 1937 (aged 57) Paris, France
- Allegiance: Russian Empire (Russia) White Movement
- Branch: Imperial Russian Navy
- Service years: 1898–1917
- Rank: Captain 1st Rank
- Commands: Imperial Yacht Standart
- Conflicts: Russo-Japanese War; World War I Russian Civil War

Nikolai Pavlovich Sablin (Russian: Николай Павлович Саблин) (16 April 1880 – 21 August 1937) was an officer in the Imperial Russian Navy

Sablin was born into a naval family in Mykolaiv. His father was Vice Admiral Pavel Sablin and his brother was Admiral Mikhail Sablin.

Sablin graduated from the Marine Cadet Corps in 1898 and fought in the suppression of the Boxer Rebellion in China in 1899-1900. During the Russo-Japanese War of 1904-1905, Sablin was an officer on the cruiser Almaz. From 1906 to 1914 he served on the Imperial Yacht Standart, eventually becoming her commander. In 1914. Sablin became the naval Aide de camp to Tsar Nicholas II and later in World War I commanded a battalion of the Russian Guard. He was dismissed from service after the February Revolution and joined the White Russian forces in Ukraine and South Russia.

Sablin was evacuated from Crimea in 1921 and subsequently lived in Constantinople, Berlin and Paris. He was a prominent member of Russian Exile organisations. Before his death, he wrote his memoirs together with Roman Borisovich Gul detailing his experiences with the Russian Imperial family. Sablin died in Paris and was buried in the Sainte-Geneviève-des-Bois Russian Cemetery.

== Bibliography ==
- Волков С. В. Офицеры флота и Морского ведомства. М., 2004
- Page in Russian from Hronos
