= Nikolai Kuzmin =

Soviet military leader

Nikolai Nikolayevich Kuzmin
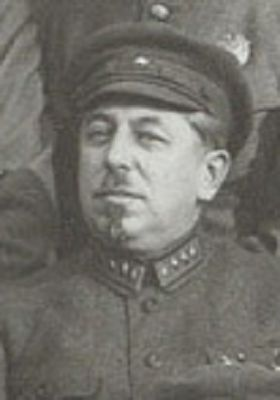
- Born: April 3, 1883; Saint Petersburg, Russia
- Died: February 8, 1938 (aged 54) Soviet Union
- Allegiance: Soviet Union
- Branch: Soviet Navy
- Service years: 1917–1932
- Rank: Commisar
- Commands: Baltic Fleet
- Conflicts: Estonian War of Independence; Russian Civil War
- Awards: Two

Nikolai Nikolayevich Kuzmin (Russian: Николай Николаевич Кузьмин; 3 April 1883 – 8 February 1938) was a Soviet political and military leader. He was the political commissar of the Baltic Fleet during the time of the Russian Civil War.

Born in Saint Petersburg, Kuzmin graduated from St Petersburg University and joined the Bolshevik faction of the Russian Social Democratic Labour Party in 1903. He participated in the 1905 revolution. In 1917 he was a member of the military organisation of the Central Committee of the Bolshevik Party. He was also editor of two newspapers Soldatskaya Pravda («Солдатская правда») and Derevenskaya Bednota («Деревенская беднота»).

During the Civil War Kuzmin served as a Political Commissar on the South Western Front (1918–1919) and the Petrograd area from 1920. In 1920 he was appointed Political commissar of the Baltic Fleet and took part in suppressing the Kronstadt rebellion. He was awarded the Order of the Red Banner.

In 1924 Kuzmin became chief assistant prosecutor in the Supreme Court of the USSR for military justice. He was critical of the abuse of power by the OGPU and removed from his post. He was made Chief Political Officer of the Central Asian Military District in 1925 and in 1931-32 he was made Chief Political Officer of the Siberian Military District.

Kuzmin moved into civilian life in 1932 and became head of the Omsk branch of Sevmorput. He was arrested on 28 May 1937 as part of Stalin's purges. Kuzmin refused to confess and pleaded not guilty at his trial. He was sentenced to death and shot on 8 February 1938. Kuzmin was posthumously rehabilitated in 1956.
