= Russian destroyer Konstantin =

Imperial Russian destroyer

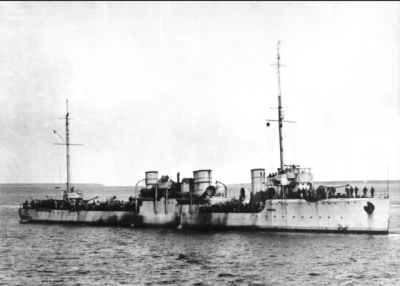

History

Russian Empire
- Name: Konstantin
- Builder: Russo-Baltic Shipyard, Reval, Governorate of Estonia
- Laid down: 24 November 1913
- Launched: 30 August 1915
- Completed: 6 May 1917
- Fate: Seized by the Bolsheviks, November 1917

Russian SFSR
- Acquired: November 1917
- Fate: Mined and sunk, 21 October 1919

General characteristics (as built)
- Class & type: Gavriil-class destroyer
- Displacement: 1,260 t (1,240 long tons)
- Length: 98 m (321 ft 6 in)
- Beam: 9.34 m (30 ft 8 in)
- Draught: 3.9 m (12 ft 10 in) (deep load)
- Installed power: 4 water-tube boilers; 30,000 shp (22,000 kW)
- Propulsion: 2 shafts, 2 steam turbines
- Speed: 31 knots (57 km/h; 36 mph)
- Range: 1,680 nmi (3,110 km; 1,930 mi) at 21 knots (39 km/h; 24 mph)
- Complement: 150
- Armament: 4 × single 102 mm (4 in) guns; 1 × single 63 mm (2.5 in) AA gun; 3 × triple 45 cm (17.7 in) torpedo tubes; 80 mines

Konstantin (Russian: Константин) was an Gavrill-class destroyer built for the Imperial Russian Navy during World War I. Completed in 1917, she served with the Baltic Fleet. The ship was taken over by the Bolsheviks during the October Revolution later that year. Konstantin was sunk in 1919 in a British minefield during their intervention in the Russian Civil War.

== Design and description ==
The Gavriil-class ships were designed as an improved version of the Derzky class. The ships normally displaced 1,360 long tons (1,380 t) and 1,562–1,600 long tons (1,587–1,626 t) at full load. They measured 98 meters (321 ft 6 in) long overall with a beam of 9.34 meters (30 ft 8 in), and a draft of 3.15 meters (10 ft 4 in). The Gavriils were propelled by two steam turbines, each driving one propeller shaft using steam from four boilers. The turbines were designed to produce a total of 30,000 shaft horsepower (22,000 kW) for an intended maximum speed of 35 knots (65 km/h; 40 mph). On Konstasntin's sea trials, she only reached 31.5 knots (58.3 km/h; 36.2 mph) from 30,954 shp (23,082 kW). The ships carried enough fuel oil to give them a range of 1,680 nautical miles (3,110 km; 1,930 mi) at 21 knots (39 km/h; 24 mph). Their crew numbered 150.

The Gavriil-class ships were originally intended to have an armament of two single four-inch (102 mm) Pattern 1911 Obukhov guns and a dozen 450-millimeter (17.7 in) torpedo tubes in six double mounts. The Naval General Staff changed this to four triple mounts once they became available and then decided to exchange a torpedo mount for two more four-inch guns in August 1915 while the ships were still under construction. One of these guns was mounted on the forecastle and three on the stern, aft of the torpedo tubes. All of these guns were on the centerline and interfered with each other's movements. Anti-aircraft defense was provided by a 2.5 in (64 mm) anti-aircraft (AA) gun in a single mount amidships. The Gavriils were completed with one triple torpedo mount between the forward funnels and two mounts aft of the rear funnel. The ships could carry 80 M1912 naval mines. They were also fitted with a Barr and Stroud rangefinder and two 60-centimeter (24 in) searchlights.

== Construction and career ==
Konstantin was commissioned on 6 May 1917 and participated in operations during the First World War as part of the Baltic Fleet. Her crew joined the Bolsheviks after the October Revolution in 1917. The ship was sunk on 21 October 1919 in a British minefield during their intervention in the Russian Civil War.

== Bibliography ==
- Apalkov, Yu. V. (1996). Боевые корабли русского флота: 8.1914-10.1917г [Combat Ships of the Russian Fleet: 8.1914-10.1917] (in Russian). ИНТЕК. ISBN 5-7559-0018-3.
- Berezhnoy, S. S. (2002). Крейсера и Миносцы: Справочик [Cruisers and Destroyers: Reference] (in Russian). Ввоенное Ииздательство. ISBN 5-203-01780-8.
- Breyer, Siegfried (1992). Soviet Warship Development: Volume 1: 1917–1937. Conway Maritime Press. ISBN 0-85177-604-3.
- Budzbon, Przemysław (1985). "Russia". In Gray, Randal (ed.). Conway's All the World's Fighting Ships 1906–1921. Naval Institute Press. pp. 291–325. ISBN 0-85177-245-5.
- Chernyshev, Alexander (2007). "Новики": Лучшие эсминцы российского императосого флота ["Noviki": The Best Destroyers of the Imperial Russian Navy] (in Russian). Эксмо. ISBN 978-5-699-23164-5.
- Verstyuk, Anatoly & Gordeyev, Stanislav (2006). Корабли Минных дивизий. От "Новика" до "Гогланда" [Torpedo Division Ships: From Novik to Gogland] (in Russian). Voennaya Kniga. ISBN 5-902863-10-4.
