= Koporye Bay =

Bay of the Gulf of Finland

Coordinates: 59°51′N 28°48′E

The south coast of the Gulf of Finland.

The Koporye Bay (Russian: Копорская губа, romanized: Koporskaya Guba) is a 12 km-long bay on the southern coast of the Gulf of Finland. It is up to 26 km wide and 20 meters deep. The shore is low and rocky; the hinterland is woody. It is part of Russia's Leningrad Oblast. The only major settlement is the town of Sosnovy Bor. The Voronka and Sista Rivers drain into the bay. It is named after the medieval fortress of Koporye, which lies slightly to the south. The Leningrad Nuclear Power Plant in Sosnovy Bor uses the bay as a cold seawater reservoir for cooling.
