= List of destroyers of the Imperial Russian Navy =

Российский Императорский флот Rossiiskiy Imperatorskiy flot
- Naval jack (top) and ensign of the Russian Navy
- Active: 1696 – February 1917
- Country: Russian Empire

== 1877–1917 ==
The format is: Name, launch year, place of construction (if foreign), commissioning fleet (BF = Baltic Fleet, BSF = Black Sea Fleet, CF = Caspian Flotilla, SF = Siberian Flotilla, POF = Pacific Ocean Fleet), fate = BU.

Note on official classification. First small ships with a mine or torpedo — (pole mines or Whitehead torpedoes) — appeared in the Russian Navy in 1877 during the Russo-Turkish War (1877–1878). They were classified "minnyi kater", "минный катер" ("mine/torpedo launch"). One large seagoing ship, the Vzryv ("Взрыв", 1877, 160 tons) with torpedo armament was originally called "minnoye sudno", "минное судно" ("mine/torpedo vessel"). A large series of 133 20-30-ton ships followed in 1878; they were classified "minonoska", "minonosnaya lodka", "миноноска" (literally, "mine/torpedo boat"). It usually translates as "torpedo boat, 2nd class". Then came torpedo ships, which Russia had built or bought since 1880 and classified as "minonosets", "миноносец" (literally, "mine/torpedo carrier"). This designation includes relatively large ships. It therefore translates into English as either "torpedo boat 1st class" or "destroyer" depending on a displacement of more or less than 200 tons. Starting in 1907 and still used today, all sufficiently large torpedo armed ships are classified as EM (ЭМ), "eskadrennyi minonosets", "эскадренный миноносец" (literally, "squadron torpedo carrier"), which usually translates as "destroyer".

First Russian torpedo vessel Vzryv (1877). She was armed with a bow underwater torpedo tube	The torpedo launch Chesma (1877), which accomplished the first combat torpedo attack	Torpedo boat № 61 with projecting mine launchers, Saint Petersburg, c. 1895	Russian Pernov-type torpedo boat No.142 (1897) at the naval parade on the occasion of the summit of Emperors Nicholas II and Wilhelm II. Reval, 1902

== Main list ==
=== Sokol class (240–300 tons), 27 ships ===
Russia was the second nation, after Great Britain, to build torpedo boat destroyers (TBDs), basing their first ones upon the Yarrow design. Sokol, which was built for Russia by Britain's Yarrow Shipbuilders, was laid down in 1894 and completed in January 1895; she was 190 feet long, displaced 220 tons, and attained a speed of over 30 knots during her trials. Sokol was followed by 26 similar TBDs built in Russian yards between 1896 and 1903. This first series of 'classic' Havock-class ships were originally organized as torpedo boats ("minonosets"), then were later reclassified as destroyers ("eskadrennyi minonosets") in 1907. Pacific destroyers were built in Saint Petersburg, transported in sections by railway to Port Arthur and assembled. They subsequently participated in the Russo-Japanese War of 1904–1905; those that had escaped from Port Arthur later served in the Siberian Flotilla. Baltic destroyers participated in World War I, the Russian Civil War (1917–1923) and the Finnish Civil War (1918) as minesweepers and avisos. Black Sea destroyers also participated in World War I and the Russian Civil War.

During the Russo-Japanese War (1904–1905), Imperial Russian Navy destroyers were armed with 15-inch torpedoes and one 75 mm gun, as well as several 3-pounder QF guns. Combat experience during that war resulted in the Imperial Russian Navy switching to 18-inch torpedoes and two 75 mm guns for their destroyers after the war.

- Sokol ("Сокол") launched 1895, Yarrow, London. Baltic Fleet. – Renamed Prytkiy ("Прыткий") in 1902; she was fitted as a minesweeper in 1915, transferred to the Volga River and the Caspian Sea in 1918–1919, and broken up (BU) in 1922.
- Yastreb ("Ястреб", 1898, BF) – Prochnyi ("Прочный") 1902; she was reclassified as a minesweeper 1913, transferred to the Volga and the Caspian in 1918, BU in 1922
- Korshun ("Коршун") launched 1898 Crichton, St. Petersburg. Baltic Fleet. Poslushnyi ("Послушный") 1902; reclassified as a minesweeper in 1913, handed over to the Finnish Red Army in 1918; she served in the Finnish Navy as Torpedo Boat S3 from 1918, returned to Soviet Russia in 1920, probably BU in 1925
- Nyrok ("Нырок", 1898, BF) – Porazhayushchiy ("Поражающий"), an aviso in 1913; she was transferred to the Volga and the Caspian Sea in 1918, BU in 1925
- Voron ("Ворон", 1899, BF) – Rezvyi ("Резвый") 1902, reclassified as a minesweeper in 1913, handed over to the Finnish Red Army in 1918; she served in the Finnish Navy as Torpedo Boat S4 from 1918, returned to Soviet Russia in 1920, probably BU in 1925
- Gagara ("Гагара", 1899, BF) – Prozorlivyi ("Прозорливый") 1902, reclassified as a minesweeper in 1913, handed over to the Finnish Red Army in 1918; she served in the Finnish Navy as Torpedo Boat S2 from 1918 and was lost with all hands in a storm on October 4, 1925
- Filin ("Филин", 1900, BF) – Retivyi ("Ретивый") 1902; she was reclassified as a minesweeper in 1913, transferred to the Volga and the Caspian Sea in 1918 and BU in 1922
- Sova ("Сова", 1900, BF) – Ryanyi ("Рьяный") 1902, reclassified as a minesweeper in 1913, handed over to the Finnish Red Army in 1918, served in the Finnish Navy as Torpedo Boat S1 from 1918, decommissioned in 1927, sunk as target.
- Albatros ("Альбатрос", 1901, BF) – Podvizhnyi ("Подвижный") 1902, handed over to the Finnish Red Army in 1918, served in the Finnish Navy as Torpedo Boat S5; decommissioned in 1925 and sunk in 1944
- Berkut ("Беркут", 1898, CF) – Pronzitel‘nyi ("Пронзительный") 1902, decommissioned in 1911
- Krechet ("Кречет") launched 1898 Crichton, Turku., CF – Pylkiy ("Прыткий") 1902, hulked in 1911
- Lebed‘ ("Лебедь", 1901, BSF) – became Strogiy ("Строгий") in 1902 and the Marti ("Марти") 1922, BU in 1929
- Pelikan ("Пеликан", 1901, BSF) – Smetlivyi ("Сметливый") 1902, scuttled to avoid capture at Tsemes Bay on 18 June 1918
- Pavlin ("Павлин", 1901, BSF) – became Svirepyi ("Свирепый") in 1902, the destroyer № 204 in 1918, Svirepyi ("Свирепый") in 1919 and Leitenant Schmidt ("Лейтенант Шмидт") in 1922, BU in 1927
- Fazan ("Фазан", 1901, BSF) – Stremitel‘nyi ("Стремительный") in 1902; she was scuttled to avoid capture at Tsemes Bay on 18 June 1918
- Kondor ("Кондор"), ex-Baklan ("Баклан", 1901, POF) – Reshitel‘nyi ("Решительный") 1902, captured by Japan in Chefoo (China) in 1904, renamed Akatsuki in 1905, participated in the Battle of Tsushima where she collided with a Japanese torpedo boat which sank, renamed Yamabiko in 1906; she was decommissioned in 1917
- Bekas ("Бекас", 1901, POF) – Serdityi ("Сердитый") 1902, BU in 1923
- Smelyi ("Смелый"), ex-Gorlitsa ("Горлица") (1902, POF) – BU in 1923
- Skoryi ("Скорый"), ex-Perepel ("Перепел") (1903, POF) – BU in 1923
- Statnyi ("Статный"), ex-Shchegol ("Щегол") (1903, POF) – BU in 1923
- Steregushchiy ("Стерегущий"), ex-Kulik ("Кулик") (1903, POF) – sunk in battle in 1904 (49 men were lost)
- Strashnyi ("Страшный", ex-Skvorets ("Скворец") (1903, POF) – On 13 April 1904 while returning from patrol, and attempting to re-enter Port Arthur, Strashnyi was suddenly engaged by Imperial Japanese Navy (IJN) torpedo boat destroyers, and was sunk during the surface engagement; 59 crewmen were lost.
- Storozhevoy ("Сторожевой"), ex-Grach ("Грач") (1903, POF) – struck a mine and was scuttled in 1904
- Sil‘nyi ("Сильный"), ex-Baklan ("Баклан"), ex Kondor ("Кондор") (1903, POF) – After successfully sinking the IJN block ship (aka fireship) Chiyo Maru with a torpedo, she duelled with IJN torpedo boat destroyers shortly afterwards, and was driven onto a sandbank on 27 March 1904. She was subsequently refloated by Japan in 1905, renamed Fumizuki; she was decommissioned in 1913
- Stroynyi ("Стройный"), ex-Strizh ("Стриж") (1903, POF) – struck a mine in 1904 (2 men lost)
- Razyashchiy ("Разящий"), ex-Drozd ("Дрозд") (1903, POF) – struck a mine and was scuttled in 1904
- Rastoropnyi ("Расторопный"), ex-Diatel ("Дятел") (1903, POF) – scuttled in 1904

=== Hǎi Lóng (海龙) class (ex-Chinese) (312 tons), 1 ship ===
- Leitenant Burakov (1898, Elbing (German Empire, now in modern northern Poland), ex-Chinese Hǎi Huā — 海華) – captured at the Taku Forts during the Boxer Rebellion (17 June 1900), renamed Taku ("Таку"), in 1901 – Leitenant Burakov ("Лейтенант Бураков"); she was the fastest Russian torpedo boat (33.6 kn) during the siege of Port Arthur; she served as an aviso. Badly damaged by a Japanese torpedo launch, she was scuttled by her crew in 1904.

=== Kit class (350 tons), 4 ships ===
Torpedo boats participated in the Russo-Japanese War of 1904–1905. Three of them later served in the Siberian Flotilla; they were reclassified as destroyers in 1907

- Kit ("Кит", 1899, Elbing POF) – Renamed Bditel‘nyi ("Бдительный") 1902; she struck a mine and was scuttled in 1904
- Del‘fin ("Дельфин", 1899, Elbing, POF) – Besstrashnyi ("Бесстрашный") 1902; she was transferred to the Arctic Sea Flotilla in 1917 and BU in 1924
- Skat ("Скат", 1899, Elbing, POF) – Besposhchadnyi ("Беспощадный") 1902, BU in 1923
- Kasatka ("Касатка", 1900, Elbing, POF) – Besshumnyi ("Бесшумный") 1902, transferred to the Arctic Sea Flotilla in 1917, BU in 1924

=== Forel class (312/346 tons), 5 ships ===
Officially classified as torpedo boats, they participated in the Russo-Japanese War. Two later served in the Siberian and Arctic Flotillas.

- Forel ("Форель", 1900, Le Havre, POF) – Renamed Vnimatelnyi ("Внимательный") 1902, wrecked in 1904
- Sterliad‘ ("Стерлядь", 1901, Le Havre, POF) – Vynoslivyi ("Выносливый") 1902, struck a mine in 1904 (12 men lost)
- Osiotr ("Осётр", 1901, Le Havre, POF) – Vnushitelnyi ("Внушительный") 1902, scuttled in 1904
- Kefal ("Кефаль", 1901, Le Havre, POF) – Vlastnyi ("Властный") 1902, transferred to the Arctic Sea Flotilla 1917, BU in 1921
- Losos ("Лосось", 1902, Le Havre, POF) – Grozovoi ("Грозовой") 1902, transferred to the Arctic Sea Flotilla 1917, BU in 1923–24

=== Som-class torpedo boat (350 tons), 1 ship ===
- Som ("Сом", 1899, Birkenhead, POF) – Boevoy ("Боевой") since 1902, sunk by Japanese torpedo destroyer in 1904

=== Buinyi class (350/450 tons), 10 ships ===
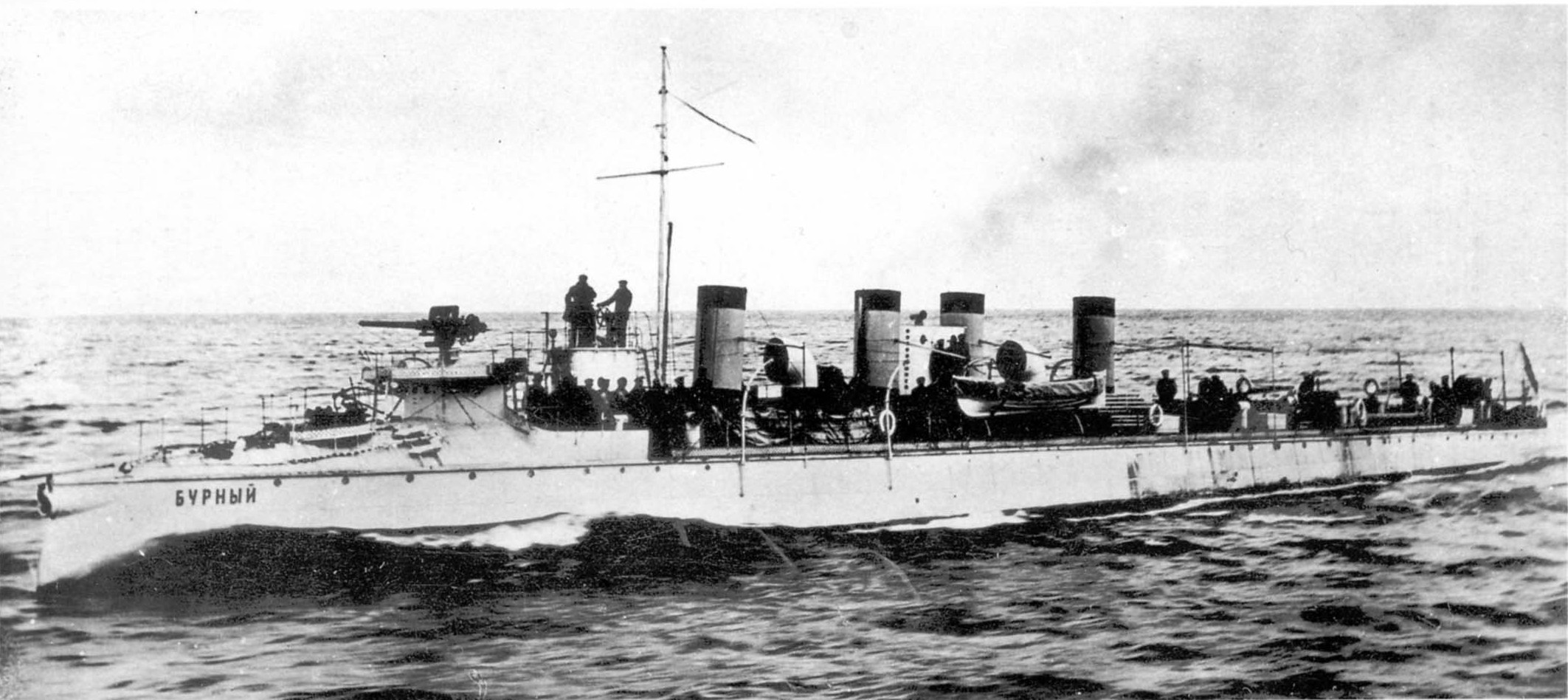
The torpedo boat Burnyi not long before transferring to Port Arthur. Baltic Sea, October 1902

Two Pacific ships participated in the defence of Port Arthur in 1904; those destined for the Baltic (except for the uncompleted Vidnyi) were sent to the Far East and fought in the Battle of Tsushima (1905). The survivors were reclassified as destroyers in 1907. Originally named after various aquatic animals and fish, the Buinyi class were named after various "active" characteristics at the time of Tsushima, with all but one beginning with the Russian letter Б.

- Buinyi ("Буйный", "Riotous"), ex-Bychiok ("Бычёк", "Goby") (1901, BF) – scuttled in 1905
- Boikiy ("Бойкий", "Jaunty"), ex-Akula ("Акула", "Shark") (1901, POF) – after the war she served with the Siberian Flotilla, BU in 1925
- Burnyi ("Бурный", "Tumultuous "), ex-Makrel‘ ("Макрель", "Mackerel") (1901, POF) – wrecked and scuttled in 1904
- Bystryi ("Быстрый", "Fast"), ex-Plotva ("Плотва", "Roach") (1901, BF) – scuttled in 1905
- Bravyi ("Бравый", "Gallant" or "Dashing"), ex-Nalim ("Налим", "Burbot") (1901, BF) – after the war she served in the Siberian Flotilla; she was renamed the Anisimov ("Анисимов") in 1923, BU in 1925
- Blestyashchiy ("Блестящий", "Brilliant"), ex-Okun‘ ("Окунь", "Perch") (1901, BF) – scuttled in 1905 (6 men lost)
- Bedovyi ("Бедовый", "Daring" or "Reckless"), ex-Keta ("Кета", "Chum") (1902, BF) – captured by Japan with the Commander-in-Chief of the Russian squadron, Admiral Zinovy Rozhestvensky in 1905; she was renamed the Satsuki and BU in 1922
- Bodryi ("Бодрый", "Bouncy" or "Cheerful"), ex-Peskar‘ ("Пескарь", "Gudgeon") (1902, BF) – after the war she served with the Siberian Flotilla, BU in 1925
- Bezuprechnyi ("Безупречный", "Irreproachable" or "Perfect"), ex-Paltus ("Палтус", "Halibut") (1902, BF) – sunk in battle in 1905 (73 men lost)
- Vidnyi ("Видный", "Prominent"), ex-Sig ("Сиг", "Whitefish") (1904, BF) – BU in 1925

=== Groznyi class / Project of 1903 (420 tons), 3 ships ===
Originally classified as torpedo boats. The first two were sent to the Far East and took part in the Battle of Tsushima in 1905.

- Groznyi ("Грозный", 1904, BF) – after the war she served in the Siberian Flotilla; she was classified as a destroyer in 1907, BU in 1925
- Gromkiy ("Громкий", 1904, BF) – sunk in battle in 1905 (23 men lost)
- Gromiashchiy ("Громящий", 1904, BF) – classified as a destroyer in 1907, BU in 1925

=== ''Leitenant Pushchin'' class / "Z" and "Zh" class (350/440 tons), 9 ships ===
Classified as destroyers in 1907. Participated in World War I and in the Russian Civil War.

- Zavetnyi (Russian: Заветный), ex-Karp (Russian: Карп) (1903, BSF) – captured by Germany in 1918, scuttled by her crew in 1919
- Zavidny (Russian: Завидный), ex-Beluga (Russian: Белуга) (1903, BSF) – captured by Germany in 1918 (renamed R 13), destroyed by British troops in 1919, restored by Soviet Russia
- Zhivoy (Russian: Живой), ex-Rybets (Russian: Рыбец) (1903, BSF) – captured by Germany in 1918 (R 14), captured by Britain and delivered to the White Army in 1918–19, renamed the Zhivoy (Живой), wrecked in 1920 (250 men lost: crew and evacuees)
- Zhutkiy (Russian: Жуткий, ex-Ugor (Russian: Угорь) (1904, BSF) – captured by Germany in 1918 (R 12), destroyed by British troops in 1919
- Zharkiy (Russian: Жаркий), ex-Shchuka (Russian: Щука) (1904, BSF) – captured by Germany in 1918, captured by Britain and delivered to the White Army in 1919, interned by France in Bizerte in 1920, returned to Soviet Russia and BU in 1924
- Zhivuchiy (Russian: Живучий), ex-Karas (Russian: Карась) (1904, BSF) – struck a mine in 1916 (48 men lost)
- Leitenant Pushchin (Russian: Лейтенант Пущин), known as Zadornyi (Russian: Задорный) until March 1907 (1904, BSF) – struck a mine in 1916 (56 men lost)
- Zvonkiy (Russian: Звонкий) (1904, BSF) – captured by Germany 1918 (R 11), captured by Britain and delivered to Greece (Doxa) in 1918, delivered to the White Army in 1919, renamed Zvonkiy (Звонкий), interned by France in Bizerte in 1920, returned to Soviet Russia and BU after 1924
- Zorkiy (Russian: Зоркий, 1904, BSF) – captured by Germany in 1918 (R 10), captured by Britain and delivered to Italy in 1918, delivered to the White Army in 1919, renamed Zorkiy (Зоркий), interned by France in Bizerte in 1920, returned to Soviet Russia and BU after 1924

=== Leytenant Burakov class (237/320 tons), 11 ships ===
After completion all ships were reclassified as destroyers; they participated in World War I in the Baltic Sea for patrol, cruiser and minelaying purposes. Some units participated in the Russian Civil War.

- Leytenant Burakov ("Лейтенант Бураков", 1905, Le Havre, BF) – aviso 1912, struck a mine in 1917 (23 men lost)
- Metky ("Меткий", 1905, Le Havre, BF) – BU in 1922
- Molodetsky ("Молодецкий", 1905, Le Havre, BF) – BU in 1923
- 'Moshchny ("Мощный", 1905, Le Havre, BF) – BU in 1926
- Iskusny ("Искусный", 1905, La Seyne, BF) – BU in 1924
- 'Ispolnitelny ("Исполнительный", 1905, La Seyne, BF) – wrecked in 1914 and found in 2014 (130 men lost)
- Krepky ("Крепкий", 1905, La Seyne, BF) – training destroyer Roshal ("Рошаль") in 1922, BU in 1924
- Lyogky ("Лёгкий", 1905, La Seyne, BF) – training vessel in 1920, BU in 1924
- Lovky ("Ловкий", 1905, Le Havre, BF) – BU in 1925
- Letuchy ("Летучий", 1905, Le Havre, BF) – wrecked in 1914 (65 men lost)
- Likhoy ("Лихой", 1905, Le Havre, BF) – BU in 1922

=== Tverdyi-class torpedo boats (300–310 tons), 5 ships ===
They were built in Saint Petersburg, transported in pieces by railway to Vladivostok, launched and commissioned

- Tviordyi ("Твёрдый", 1906, SF) – Renamed Lazo ("Лазо") 1923, BU in 1927
- Tochnyi ("Точный", 1906, SF) – Renamed Potapenko ("Потапенко") 1923, BU in 1927
- Trevozhnyi ("Тревожный", 1906, SF) – BU in 1923
- Inzhener-mekhanik Anastasov ("Инженер-механик Анастасов", 1907, SF) – BU in 1923
- Leitenant Maleev ("Лейтенант Малеев", 1907, SF) – BU in 1923

=== Inzhener-mekhanik Zverev class (450 tons), 10 ships ===
Classified as torpedo boats until 1907. A pair of Siberian destroyers were built in Germany, delivered to Vladivostok in parts and launched

- Kapitan Yurasovsky ("Капитан Юрасовский" in 1907, Elbing, SF) – transferred to the Arctic Sea Flotilla in 1917, BU in 1924
- Leytenant Sergeyev ("Лейтенант Сергеев" in 1907, Elbing, SF) – transferred to the Arctic Sea Flotilla in 1917, BU in 1924
- Inzhener-mekhanik Zverev ("Инженер-механик Зверев" in 1906, Elbing, BF) – minesweeper in 1922, Zhemchuzhin ("Жемчужин") in 1925, BU in 1930
- Inzhener-mekhanik Dmitriev ("Инженер-механик Дмитриев", in 1905, Elbing, BF) – minesweeper in 1922, Roshal‘ ("Рошаль") in 1925, BU in 1929
- Bditelny ("Бдительный", 1906, Elbing, BF) – struck a mine in 1917 (60 men lost)
- Boevoy ("Боевой" in 1905, Elbing, BF) – BU in 1925
- Burny ("Бурный" in 1906, Elbing, BF) – BU in 1925
- Vnimatelny ("Внимательный" in 1906, Elbing, BF) – minesweeper in 1921, BU in 1925
- Vynoslivy ("Выносливый" in 1906, Elbing, BF) – minesweeper in 1921, Artemyev ("Артемьев") 1925, decommissioned 1932, BU in 1953
- Vnushitelny ("Внуштельный" in 1906, Elbing, BF) – minesweeper in 1921, Martynov ("Мартынов") 1925, BU in 1940

=== Deyatelnyi class / Project of 1904 (382 tons), 8 ships ===
The last series of Havock-class torpedo boat destroyers. They participated in World War I in the Baltic Sea and in the Russian Civil War (1917–1923) on that country's rivers and lakes.

- Sil‘nyi ("Сильный", 1905, BF) – BU in 1924
- Storozhevoy ("Сторожевой", 1906, BF) – transferred to Lake Onega and the Caspian Sea in 1919, BU in 1925
- Stroinyi ("Стройный", 1906, BF) – sunk by a bomb in 1917
- Razyashchiy ("Разящий", 1906, BF) – BU in 1924
- Rastoropnyi ("Расторопный", 1907, BF) – transferred to the Caspian Sea in 1918, BU in 1925
- Del‘nyi ("Дельный", 1907, BF) – transferred to the Caspian Sea in 1918, BU in 1922
- Deyatel‘nyi ("Деятельный", 1907, BF) – transferred to the Caspian Sea in 1918, BU in 1925
- Dostoinyi ("Достойный", 1907, BF) – transferred to Lake Onega and the Caspian Sea in 1919, BU in 1925

=== Emir Bukharsky class / Project Letter "Sh" (Schichau) (570/650 tons), 4 ships ===
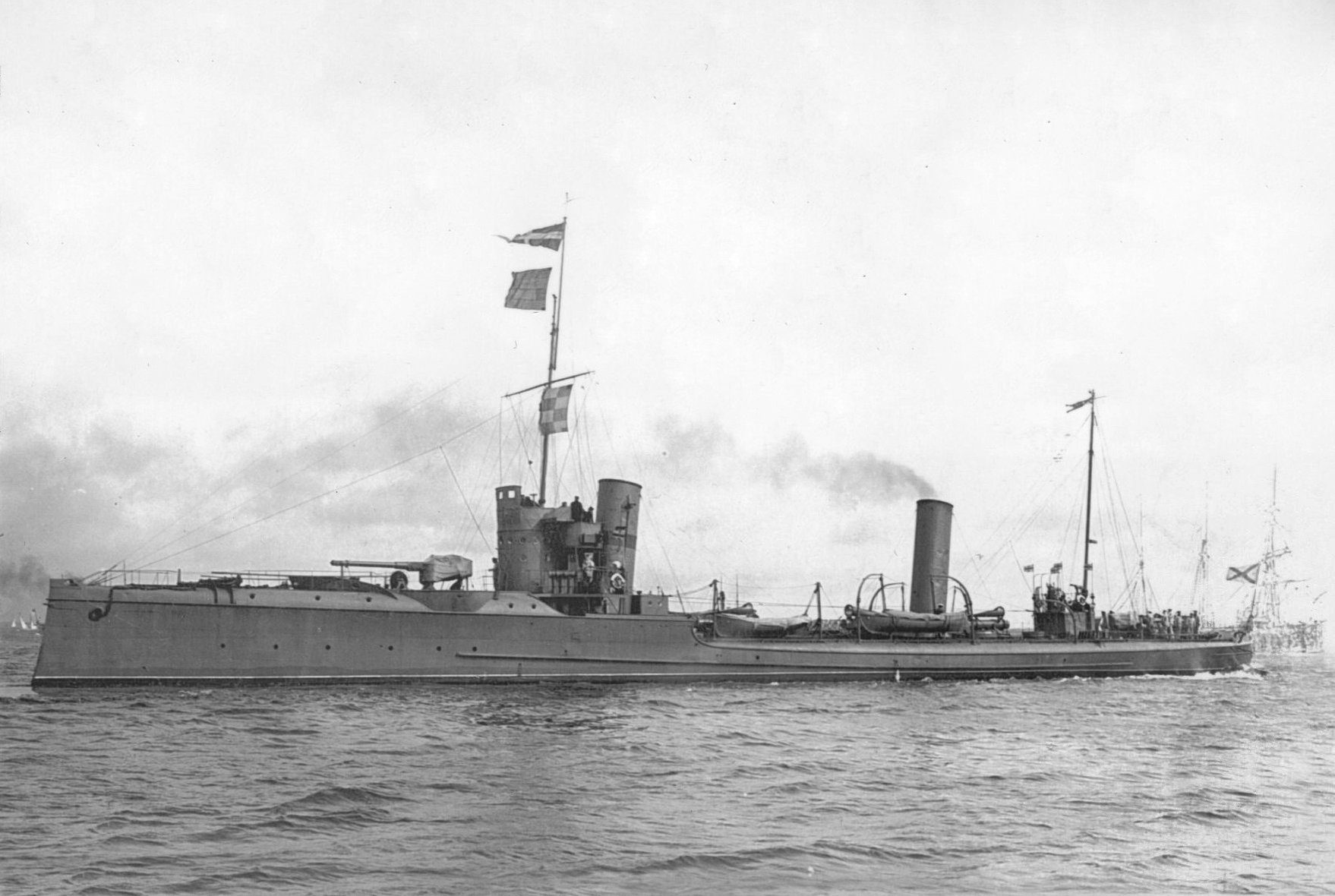
Finn

They were until 1907, classified as 'torpedo cruisers' and built with public donations, then named after the most lavish donors. They participated in World War I in the Baltic Sea and in the Russian Civil War on that country's rivers and lakes.

- Emir Bukharsky ("Эмир Бухарский", 1904, BF) – transferred to Lake Ladoga and the Caspian Sea in 1918, renamed Yakov Sverdlov ("Яков Свердлов") in 1919, BU in 1925
- Finn ("Финн", 1905, BF) – transferred to the Caspian Sea in 1918, renamed Karl Liebknecht ("Карл Либкнехт") in 1919, BU in 1925
- Moskvitianin ("Москвитянин", 1905, BF) – transferred to the Caspian Sea in 1918, sunk in a battle with a British flotilla in 1919
- Dobrovolets ("Доброволец", 1905, BF) – struck a mine in 1916 (37 men lost)

=== Vsadnik class (570/750 tons), 4 ships ===
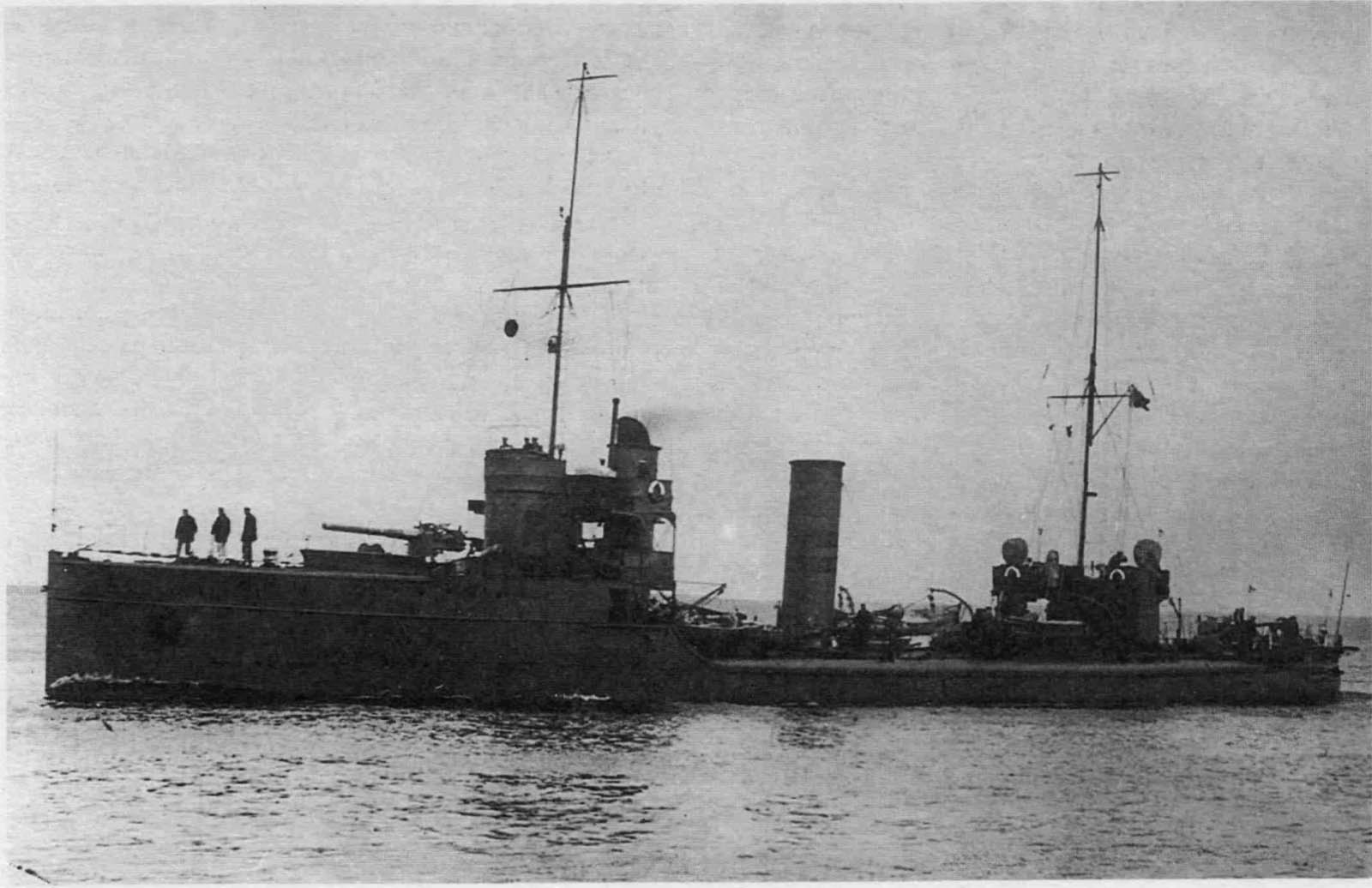
Ussuriets, Vsadnik class

Classified as 'torpedo cruisers' until 1907. Participated in World War I in the Baltic Sea and in the Russian Civil War on that country's lakes.

- Vsadnik ("Всадник", 1905, Kiel, BF) – renamed Sladkov ("Сладков") 1922, BU in 1928
- Gaidamak ("Гайдамак", 1905, Kiel, BF) – BU in 1927
- Amurets ("Амурец", 1905, Kiel, BF) – Zhelezniakov ("Железняков") 1922, aviso in 1926, hulked in 1938
- Ussuriets ("Уссуриец", 1907, Kiel, BF) – Roshal‘ ("Рошаль") 1922, wrecked in 1924

=== Okhotnik class (615/750 tons), 4 ships ===
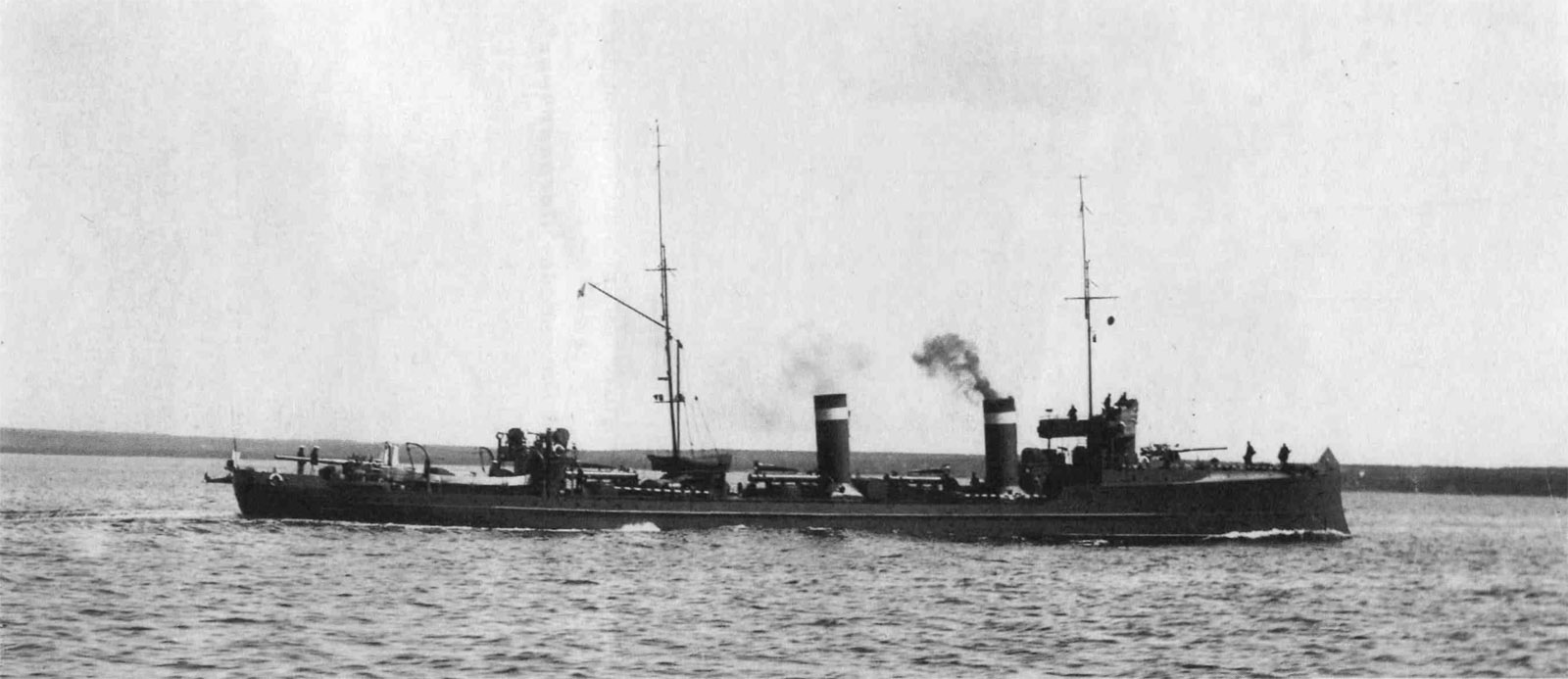
Okhotnik

Classified as 'torpedo cruisers' until 1907. Actively participated in World War I in the Baltic Sea and the Russian Civil War on that country's lakes. Designed with an unusually long hull to increase the number of guns and torpedo launchers that could be fitted, far in excess of most destroyers of the time.

- General Kondratenko ("Генерал Кондратенко", 1905, BF) – BU 1924
- Sibirsky Strelok ("Сибирский стрелок", 1905, BF) – reclassified as a test ship in 1921, renamed Konstruktor ("Конструктор") in 1926, a corvette (patrol ship) in 1941, combat service on Lake Ladoga in 1941–1944 during World War II, sunk by Finnish aircraft in 1941 (200 men lost: crew and evacuees), raised and repaired as a gunboat in 1943, test ship 1945, BU in 1957
- Okhotnik ("Охотник", 1906, BF) – struck a mine in 1917 (52 men lost)
- Pogranichnik ("Пограничник" 1906, BF) – BU in 1924

=== Ukraina class / Project Letter "V" (Vulcan) (630–730 tons), 8 ships ===
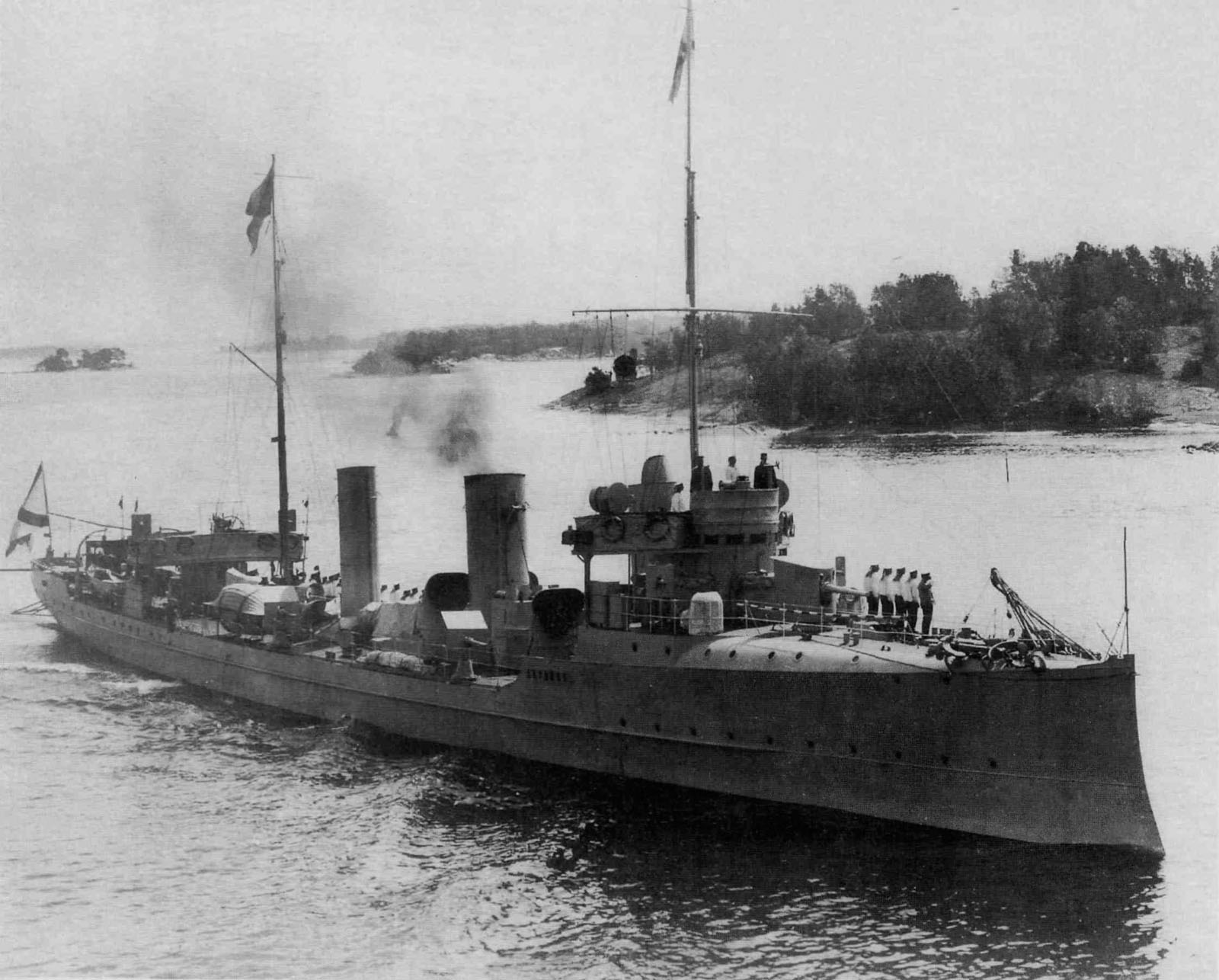
Ukrayna among Finnish skerries, in 1910

Built with public donations and named after the most lavish donors, they were classified as 'torpedo cruisers' until 1907. They participated in World War I and in the Russian Civil War on the Baltic and Caspian Seas.

- Ukraina ("Украйна", 1904, BF) – transferred to the Caspian Sea in 1919; she was renamed Karl Marx ("Карл Маркс") in 1920, Ukrayna ("Украйна") in 1920, Markin ("Маркин") in 1922, Ukrayna ("Украйна") in 1923 and Bakinskiy Rabochiy ("Бакинский рабочий") in 1924. She was a gunboat in 1926, a training ship in 1949 and sunk as a target vessel in 1961
- Voiskovoy ("Войсковой", 1904, BF) – transferred to the Caspian Sea in 1919; she was renamed Friedrich Engels ("Фридрих Энгельс") in 1920, Voiskovoy ("Войсковой") in 1920 and Markin ("Маркин") in 1923. She became a gunboat in 1926, a training ship in 1949 and was BU in 1958
- Trukhmenets ("Трухменец", 1905, BF) – Turkmenets-Stavropolsky ("Туркменец-Ставропольский") 1908; she was transferred to the Caspian Sea in 1919, renamed Mirza Kuchak ("Мирза Кучук") in 1920, Turkmenets-Stavropolsky ("Туркменец-Ставропольский") also in 1920, Altfater ("Альтфатер") in 1922 and Sovetsky Dagestan ("Советский Дагестан") in 1945. She was classified as a gunboat in 1926, a training ship in 1949 and was BU in 1962
- Kazanets ("Казанец", 1905, BF) – torpedoed by a German submarine in 1916 (45 men lost)
- Steregushchiy ("Стерегущий", 1905, BF) – BU in 1924
- Strashny ("Страшный", 1905, BF) – BU in 1924
- Donskoi Kazak ("Донской казак", 1906, BF) – BU in 1924
- Zaibaikalets ("Забайкалец", 1906, BF) – BU in 1923

=== Leytenant Shestakov class (635 tons), 4 ships ===
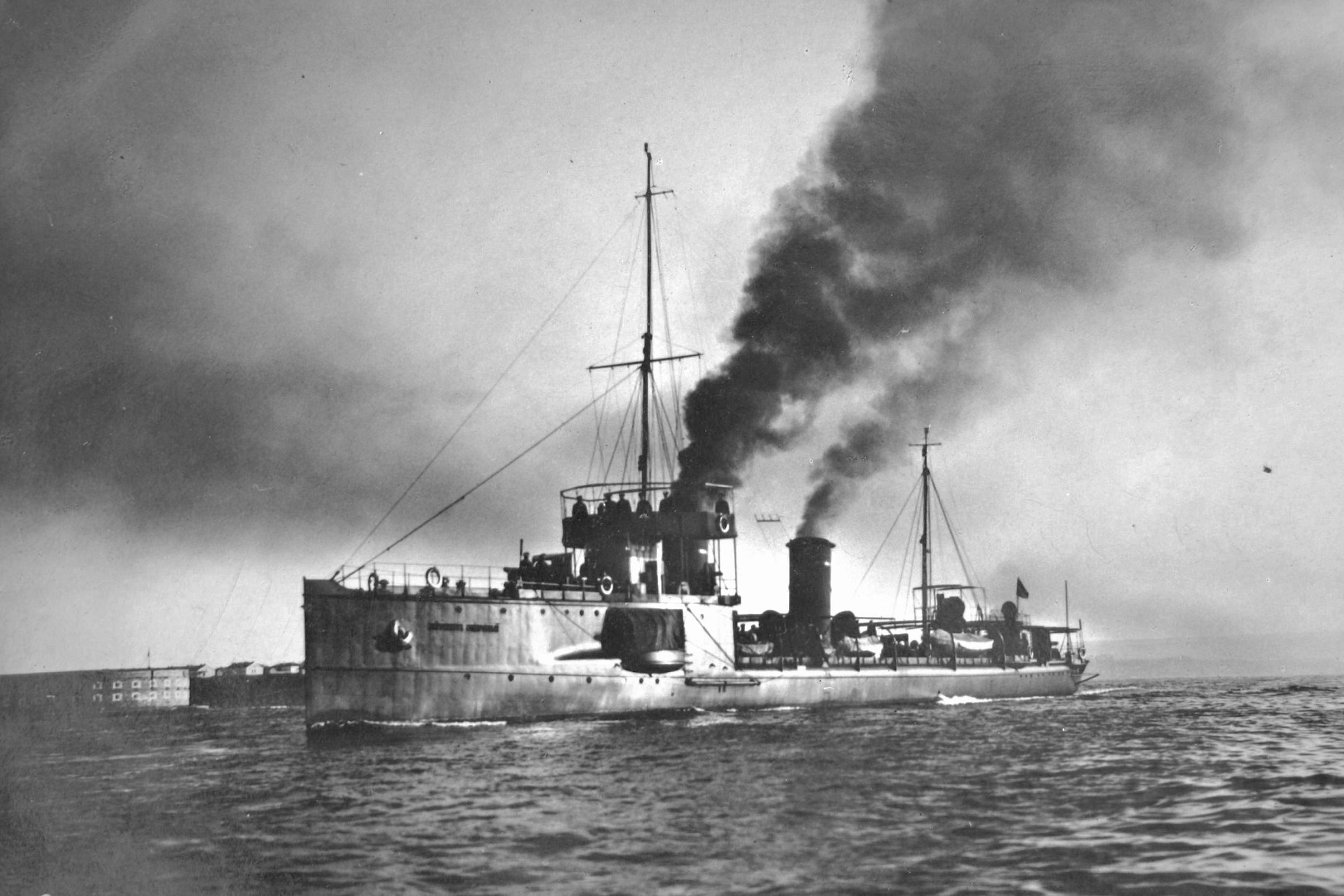
Leytenant Zatsarenni. Note the sponson in the hull

During their construction they were classified as 'torpedo cruisers'. They actively participated in World War I and in the Russian Civil War in the Black Sea. Distinguishing features of this series were the 120 mm guns.

- Leytenant Shestakov ("Лейтенант Шестаков", 1907, BSF) – scuttled in Tsemes Bay to avoid capture on 18 June 1918
- Kapitan Saken ("Капитан Сакен"), ex-Leitenant Pushchin ("Лейтенант Пущин") (1907, BSF) – captured by Germany in 1918 (renamed R 04), then captured by France (R 2), delivered to the White Army in 1919 and renamed Kapitan Saken ("Капитан Сакен"), interned by France in Bizerte in 1920, returned to Soviet Russia and BU after 1924
- Kapitan-leytenant Baranov ("Капитан-лейтенант Баранов", 1907, BSF) – scuttled in Tsemes Bay to avoid capture on 18 June 1918
- Leytenant Zatsarenny ("Лейтенант Зацарённый", 1907, BSF) – struck a mine in 1917 (37 men lost)

=== Novik class (1,260–1,620 tons), 49 ships ===
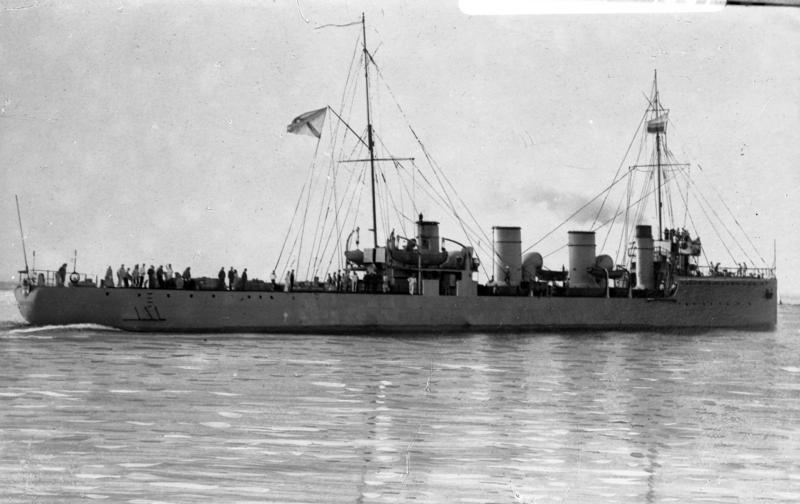
Novik in 1914

A large series of slightly differing destroyers, which took an active part in World War I. Some were completed in postrevolutionary Russia by using parts from other ships. The Baltic destroyers mostly waited through the Revolution and the Russian Civil War in Kronstadt. Later reconditioned, they took part and were lost in World War II. Black Sea ships mostly shared the fate of the Russian Black Sea Fleet of 1918–1920.

- Novik subclass (1,280 tons)
  - Novik (1911) ("Новик", 1911, BF) – fastest warship in the world at the time of completion (37.3 kn.), renamed Yakov Sverdlov ("Яков Свердлов") in 1926, struck a mine in 1941

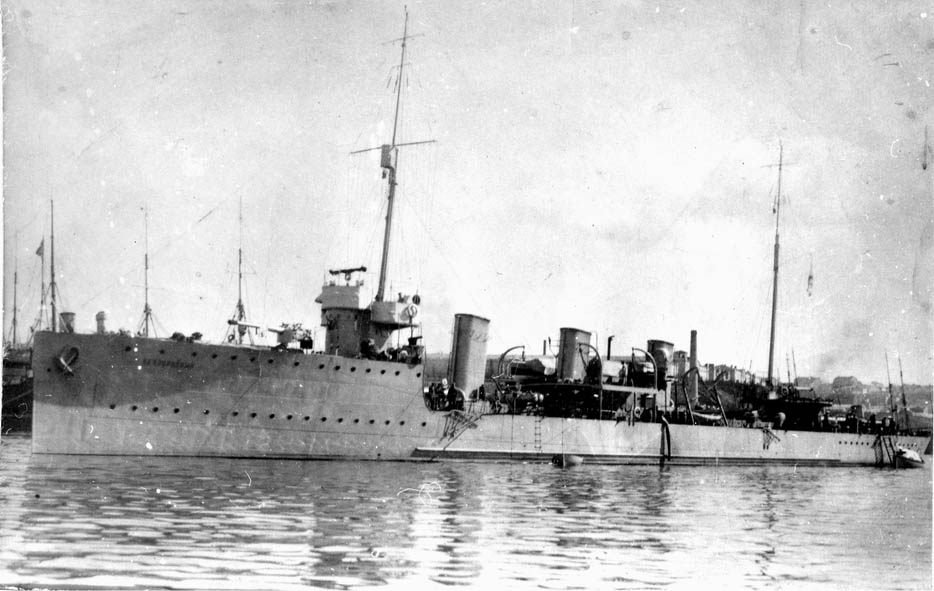
Bespokoiny, Derzky class

- Derzky class (1,180/1,405 tons), 4 ships
  - Bespokoiny ("Беспокойный", 1913, BSF) – captured by Germany in 1918, captured by France (renamed R 1), delivered to the White Army in 1919 and renamed Bespokoiny ("Беспокойный"). She was interned by France in Bizerte in 1920; she returned to Soviet Russia and was BU in 1933
  - Gnevny (1913, BSF) – she was captured by Germany in 1918 (R 03). Captured by Britain, she was delivered to the White Army in 1919, interned by France in Bizerte in 1920; she was returned to Soviet Russia and BU in 1930
  - Derzky ("Дерзкий", 1914, BSF) – captured by Germany in 1918; she was also captured by Britain, delivered to the White Army in 1919 and interned by France in Bizerte in 1920. She returned to Soviet Russia and was BU in 1933
  - Pronzitelny ("Пронзительный", 1914, BSF) – was scuttled in Tsemes Bay to prevent capture on 18 June 1918
- Shchastlivyi/Novik subclass (1,110/1,460 tons), 5 ships
  - Gromki ("Громкий", 1913, BSF) – she was scuttled in Tsemes Bay to prevent capture on 18 June 1918
  - Pospeshny ("Поспешный", 1914, BSF) – captured by Germany in 1918, captured by Britain; she was delivered to the White Army in 1919 and interned by France in Bizerte in 1920. She returned to Soviet Russia and was BU after 1924
  - Schastlivy ("Счастливый", 1914, BSF) – captured by Germany in 1918 (renamed R 01), captured by Britain; she was wrecked in 1919

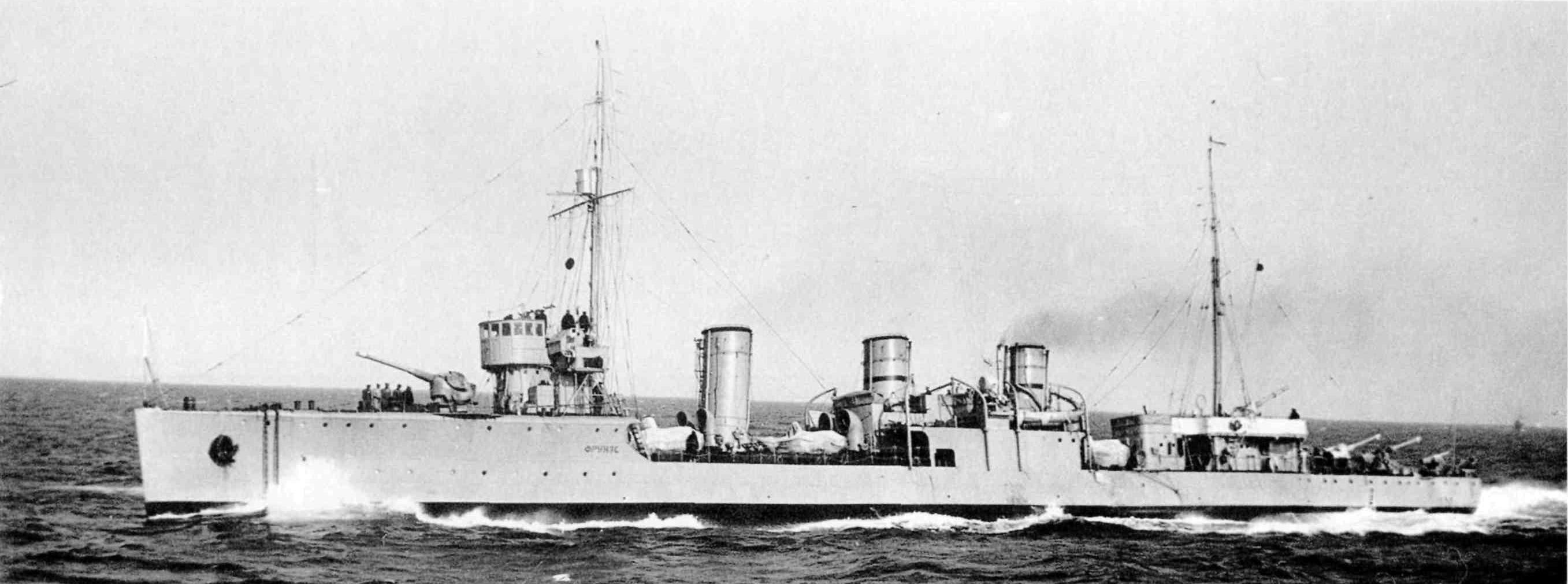
Frunze (ex-Bystryi, 1914) Novik-type destroyer

  - Bystryi ("Быстрый", 1914, BSF) – in 1918–20, being under repair, she passed from hand to hand until the Red Army took possession. Repaired and renamed Frunze ("Фрунзе") in 1925, she was sunk by German aircraft in 1941
  - Pylki ("Пылкий", 1914, BSF) – captured by Germany 1918, delivered to the White Army by the British in 1919; she was interned by France in Bizerte in 1920. She returned to Soviet Russia and was BU in 1933
- Orfey class (1,260 tons), 8 ships
  - Pobeditel ("Победитель", 1914, BF) – renamed Volodarskiy ("Володарский") 1922, struck a mine in 1941 (c.140 men lost)
  - Zabiyaka ("Забияка", 1914, BF) – renamed Uritskiy ("Урицкий") in 1922; she was transferred to the Northern Fleet in 1933. Refitted as the training vessel Reut ("Реут") in 1951; she was sunk as a target ship in 1958
  - Grom ("Гром", 1915, BF) – sunk in battle, 13 October 1917
  - Orfey ("Орфей", 1915, BF) – damaged by mine in 1917, BU in 1931
  - Letun ("Летун", 1915, BF) – damaged by mine in 1916, BU in 1927
  - Desna ("Десна", 1915, BF) – renamed Engels ("Энгельс") in 1922; she struck a mine in 1941
  - Azard ("Азард", 1916, BF) – renamed Zinovyev "Зиновьев") in 1922 and Artiom ("Артём") in 1928; she struck a mine in 1941
  - Samson ("Самсон", 1916, BF) – renamed Stalin ("Сталин") 1922; she was transferred to the Pacific Ocean Fleet in 1936, refitted to the training vessel Samson ("Самсон") 1946, hulked as a floating barracks 1951 and BU in 1956
- Gavriil/Novik subclass (1,260 tons), 14 ships
  - Leitenant Ilin ("Лейтенант Ильин", 1914, BF) – renamed Garibaldi ("Гарибальди") in 1919, Trotsky ("Троцкий") in 1922 and Voikov ("Войков") in 1928. She was transferred to the Pacific Ocean Fleet in 1936; she became a training ship in 1949 and was BU in 1956
  - Kapitan Izylmetyev ("Капитан Изыльметьев" in 1914, BF) – renamed Lenin ("Ленин") in 1922; she was scuttled to prevent capture whilst under repair at Liepāja in 1941
  - Gavriil ("Гавриил". 1915, BF) – struck a mine in 1919
  - Kapitan Belli ("Капитан Белли" 1915, completed in 1928, BF) – renamed Karl Liebknecht ("Карл Либкнехт") in 1922; she was transferred to the Northern Fleet in 1933 and hulked in 1955
  - Kapitan 1 ranga Miklukho-Maklay ("Капитан 1 ранга Миклухо-Маклай"), ex-Kapitan Kingsbergen ("Капитан Кингсберген") (1915, BF) – renamed Spartak ("Спартак") in 1918, captured by the British in 1918 in Tallinn and under the name Vambola; she was delivered to the Estonian Navy and sold on to Peru in 1933, where she was named Almirante Villar and BU in 1955
  - Kapitan Kern ("Капитан Керн" 1915, completed in 1927, BF) – renamed Rykov ("Рыков") in 1922, transferred to the Northern Fleet in 1933, renamed Valerian Kyibyshev ("Валериан Куйбышев") in 1937, converted to a target and test vessel in 1955, BU in 1958
  - Konstantin ("Константин", 1915, BF) – struck a mine in 1919
  - Vladimir ("Владимир", 1915, BF) – renamed Svoboda ("Свобода") 1917, struck a mine in 1919
  - Kapitan Konon Zotov ("Капитан Конон Зотов", 1915, BF) – BU without being completed in 1922
  - Kapitan Crown ("Капитан Кроун", 1916, BF) – BU without being completed in 1922
  - Leitenant Dubasov ("Лейтенант Дубасов", 1916, BF) – BU without being completed in 1924
  - Mikhail ("Михаил", 1916, BF) – BU without being completed in 1922
  - Sokol (1917, BF) – BU without being completed in 1922
  - Mecheslav ("Мечеслав"), ex-Leitenant Lombard ("Лейтенант Ломбард") (1917, BF) – BU without being completed in 1922

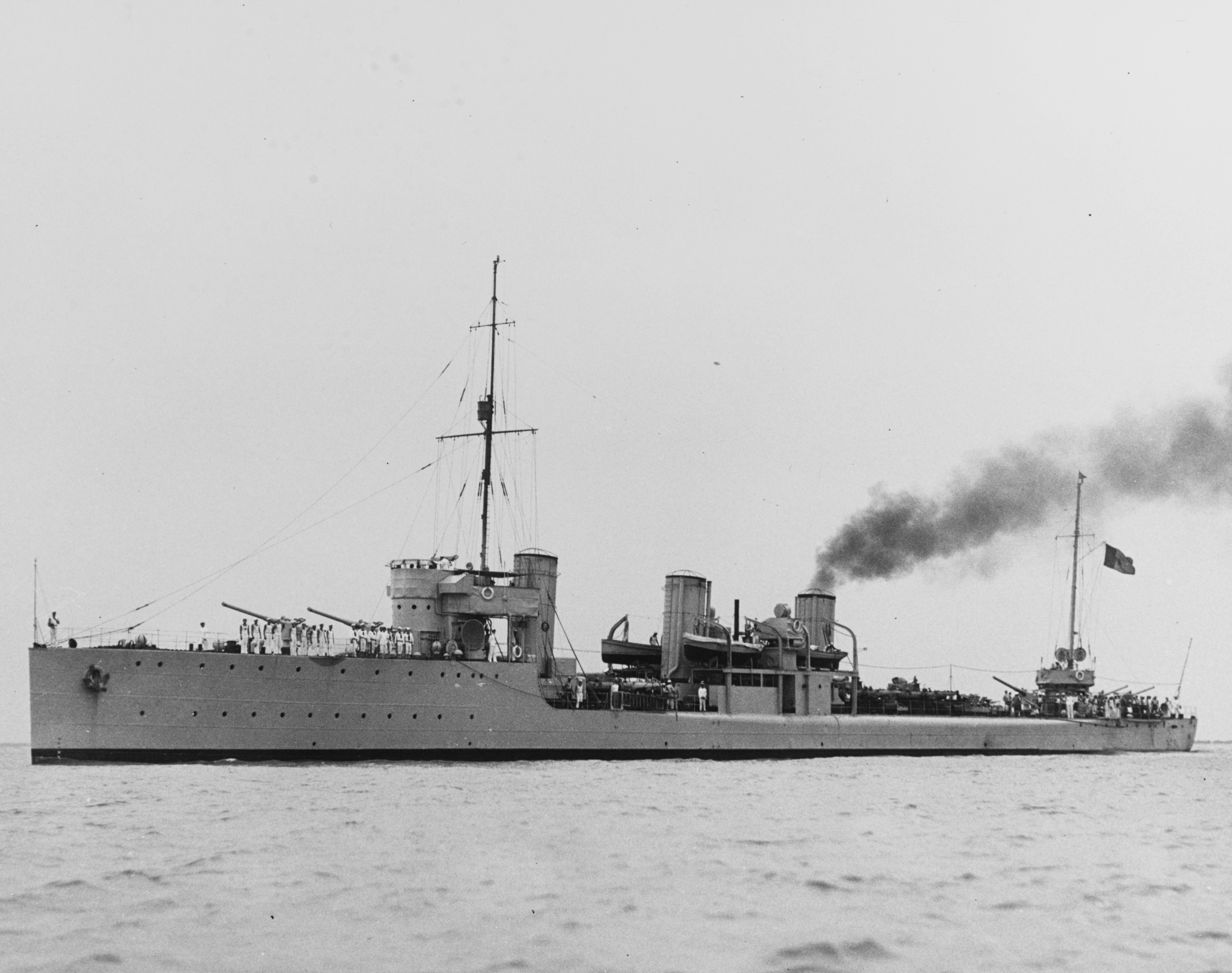
Almirante Guise, ex-Avtroil

- Izyaslav class (1,390 tons), 5 ships
  - Izyaslav ("Изяслав"), ex-Gormonosets ("Громоносец") (1914, BF) – renamed Karl Marx ("Карл Маркс") 1922, sunk by German aircraft in 1941
  - Avtroil ("Автроил", 1914, BF) – captured by the British in 1918 by Tallinn and under the name Lennuk she was delivered to the Estonian Navy. She was sold to Peru in 1933, named BAP Almirante Guise and BU in 1948
  - Pryamislav ("Прямислав", 1915, completed 1927, BF) – renamed Kalinin ("Калинин") 1925, struck a mine in 1941
  - Bryachislav ("Брячислав", 1914, BF) – wrecked in 1923, BU in 1924
  - Fiodor Stratilat ("Фёдор Стратилат", 1917, BF) – BU without being completed in 1924
- Fidonisy class (1,320–1,760 tons), 7 ships
  - Gadzhibey ("Гаджибей", 1916, BSF) – scuttled at Tsemes Bay on 18 June 1918
  - Fidonisy ("Фидониси", 1916, BSF) – scuttled at Tsemes Bay on 18 June 1918
  - Kerch ("Керчь", 1916, BSF) – scuttled at Tsemes Bay on 19 June 1918.
  - Kaliakriya ("Калиакрия", 1916, BSF) – scuttled at Tsemes Bay on 18 June 1918. Raised in 1925 and renamed Dzerzhinsky ("Дзержинский"), struck a mine in 1942
  - Zante ("Занте", 1917, completed 1923, BSF) – renamed Nezamozhnyi ("Незаможный") in 1923 and Nezamozhnik ("Незможник") in 1926, became a training ship in 1945, was rebuilt as a target vessel in 1949
  - Korfu ("Корфу", 1917, completed 1925, BSF) – renamed Petrovskiy ("Петровский") in 1925 and Zhelezniakov ("Железняков") in 1939; she served in the Bulgarian Navy from 1947 to 1949; she was hulked as a floating barracks in 1953 and BU in 1957
  - Levkas ("Левкас", 1917, completed 1925, BSF) – renamed Shaumian ("Шаумян") in 1925 and wrecked in 1942
  - Tserigo ("Цериго", 1917, BSF) – transferred incomplete by the White Army to Bizerte, interned by France, sold for BU in 1923
- Gogland/Novik-subclass destroyers, later — Mod. Gogland-class squadron minesweepers (1,350 tons), 4 ships
  - Gogland ("Гогланд", BF) – BU without being completed in 1922
  - Kulm ("Кульм", BF) – BU without being completed in 1922
  - Grengamn ("Гренгамн", BF) – BU without being completed in 1922
  - Patras ("Патрас", BF) – BU without being completed in 1922
