= Russian destroyer Boevoy =

Boevoy, also spelled Boyevoi or Boyevoy, is the name of the following destroyers in the Imperial Russian Navy:

- Russian destroyer Boevoy (1899), the only member of her class, launched in 1899 and scuttled in 1905
- Russian destroyer Boevoy (1905), an Inzhener-mekhanik Zverev-class destroyer operated between 1906 and 1925

== See also ==
- Soviet destroyer Boyevoy, index of Soviet destroyers of the same name
