= Soviet ship Bditelny =

Bditelny (Russian: Бдительный, romanized: "Vigilant"), also spelled Bditelnyy or Bditel'nyy, is the name of the following ships of the Russian Navy and/or Soviet Navy:

- Russian destroyer Bditelny, a Inzhener-mekhanik Zverev-class destroyer launched in 1906 and sunk by a mine in 1917
- Soviet corvette Bditelny, a Grisha-class corvette in commission 1981–1998.
- Soviet destroyer Bditelny (1937), a Gnevny-class destroyer sunk by aircraft in 1942
- Soviet destroyer Bditelny (1949), a Skory-class destroyer
- Soviet frigate Bditelnyy, a Krivak-class frigate in commission 1970–1996
- Soviet guard ship Bditelny, a Yastreb-class guard ship laid down in 1940 but scrapped before completion.
- Russian patrol boat Bditelny, a Rubin-class patrol boat commissioned in 2017.
