= Russian destroyer Sokol (1895) =

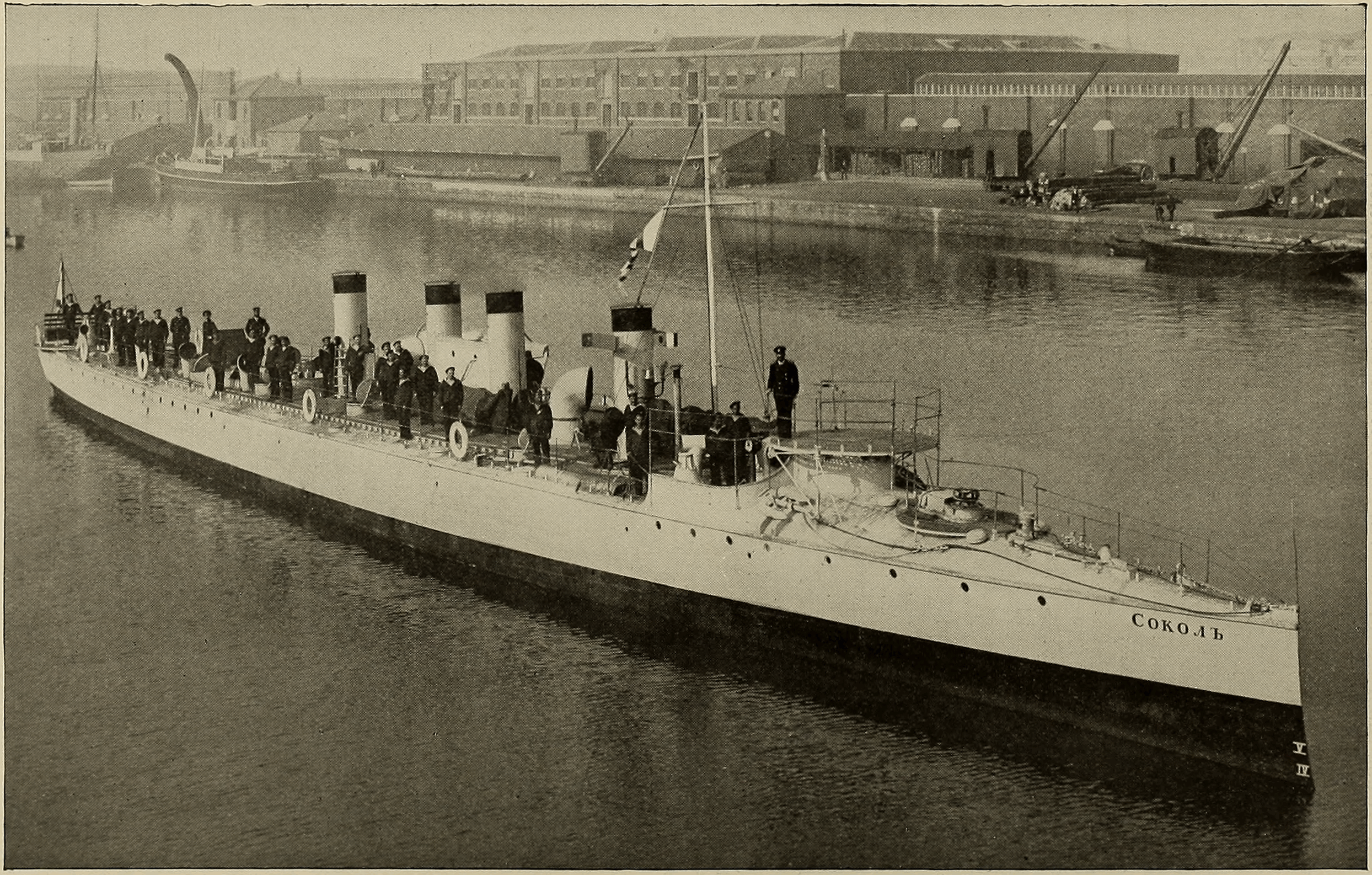
- Sokol prior to delivery in 1895

History

Russian Empire
- Name: Sokol (1895–1902) Pruitki (1902–1917)
- Builder: Yarrow, Poplar, London
- Laid down: November 1894
- Launched: 22 August 1895
- Commissioned: 1895
- Fate: Joined the Bolsheviks, November 1917

Soviet Union
- Name: Pruitki
- Acquired: November 1917
- Fate: Scrapped 1922

General characteristics
- Displacement: 220–240 long tons (220–240 t)
- Length: 57.91 m (190 ft 0 in)
- Beam: 5.64 m (18 ft 6 in)
- Draught: 2.29 m (7 ft 6 in)
- Installed power: 2,900 ihp (2,200 kW)
- Propulsion: 2 shafts, triple expansion steam engines; 8 water-tube boilers
- Speed: 29 knots (54 km/h; 33 mph)
- Armament: 1 × single 75 mm gun; 3 x 47 mm guns; 2 x single 380 mm (15 in) torpedo tubes, 6 torpedoes; 10 mines

Sokol (Russian: Сокол - Falcon) was the first torpedo boat destroyer built for the Imperial Russian Navy. She was designed and built by the British shipbuilder Yarrows from 1894 to 1895 and was claimed to be the fastest warship in the world during her sea trials. She was renamed Pruitki (Russian: Прыткий - Nimble) in 1902.

The destroyer served as part of the Russian Baltic Fleet, taking part in the First World War and joined the Bolshevik Red Fleet following the October Revolution. She was active during the Russian Civil War and was scrapped in 1922.

== Design and construction ==
The Imperial Russian Navy was the second navy, after the British Royal Navy, to order destroyers, placing an order with the British shipbuilder Yarrow & Company, a specialist in torpedo craft, which had built five of the Royal Navy's first destroyers (the Havock and Charger classes). Yarrow's design was similar to its designs for the Royal Navy, but the ship's hull made widespread use of nickel steel, with aluminium being used for some fittings to reduce weight.

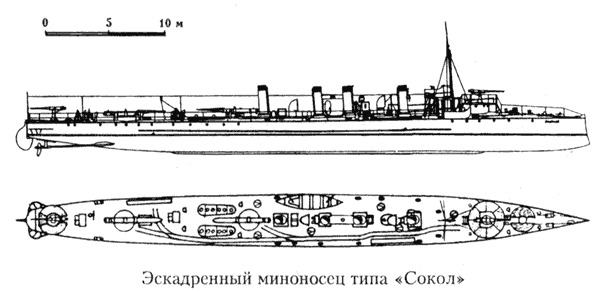

The ship was 57.91 m (190 ft 0 in) long overall, with a beam of 5.64 m (18 ft 6 in) and a mean draught of 2.29 m (7 ft 6 in). Displacement was 220–240 long tons (220–240 t). The ship was powered by two triple expansion steam engines, fed by eight Yarrow water-tube boilers with steam at 200 psi (1,400 kPa) and drove two propeller shafts. The machinery was rated at 2,900 ihp (2,200 kW), to give a speed of 29 knots (53.7 km/h; 33.4 mph). Armament was a single 75 mm gun, mounted on the roof of the ship's conning tower, together with three 47 mm guns, while two 381 mm (15 in) torpedo tubes were fitted on the centreline aft, with up to six torpedoes carried. Ten mines could be carried. The ship had a crew of 54 officers and men.

Sokol was laid down in November 1894, and was launched at Yarrow's Poplar, London shipyard on 22 August 1895 (10 August 1895, Old Style), with all machinery already fitted. This allowed the ship to commence preliminary Sea trials the next day, reaching a speed of 30.285 knots (56.1 km/h; 34.9 mph), with the speed reaching 30.28 knots (56.1 km/h; 34.8 mph) during official trials. These speeds resulted in Sokol being claimed to be the fastest warship in the world. (Note: This claim did not last long, with the French torpedo boat Forban reaching a speed of 31.029 knots (57.5 km/h; 35.7 mph) during trials in September.) Thirty-one more destroyers of similar design (twenty-six more Sokols, also known as the Puilki-class and five Tverdi-class destroyers, differing only in mounting larger torpedoes) were built in Russian yards from 1896 to 1908, although they did not manage to match the performance of Sokol.

== Service ==
Sokol commissioned in October 1895 and arrived at the Russian port of Kronstadt later that month, joining the Russian Baltic Fleet. Sokol was renamed Pruitki on 22 March 1902 (9 March 1902 Old Style). In 1902–1903, Pruitki was used for trials of the use of man-lifting kites from ships to carry observers or make meteorological observations. She underwent a major refit from 1909 to 1910, where she was rearmed as a result of experience from the Russo-Japanese War, with a second 75 mm gun replacing the three 47 mm guns, and the torpedo tubes being replaced by 457 mm (18 in) tubes.

Pruitki was obsolete and unsuitable for front-line combat use by the outbreak of the First World War in August 1914, and in 1915 was fitted for minesweeping. She was employed for minesweeping, patrol, escort duties and as a despatch vessel in the Gulf of Finland and Gulf of Bothnia during the war, joining the 2nd Minesweeping Division in January 1916.

Pruitki's crew sided with the Bolsheviks following the October Revolution, joining the Red Fleet. In March 1918, Germany intervened in the Finnish Civil War, landing a division of troops (the Baltic Sea Division) to reinforce the Finnish White forces. The advance of the Germans and White Finns soon threatened the port of Helsingfors (Helsinki), where the Baltic Fleet was based. On 10 April 1918, the Bolsheviks managed to evacuate most of the Baltic Fleet, including Pruitki, which had been supporting the Finnish Socialist Workers' Republic (the "Red" or Socialist Finns), despite much of the Baltic still being ice-bound. Pruitki arrived at Kronstadt on 19 April, taking ten days for a journey that would normally take half a day owing to the difficulty in navigating the ice in such small ships.

In August 1918, as the Russian Civil War progressed, Pruitki, together with her remaining sister ships in the Baltic Fleet, was transferred from Petrograd to the River Volga via the Mariinsk Canal System, reaching Nizhny Novgorod on 24 August. From August to October 1918, Pruitki took part in fighting against White Army forces near Kazan and on the River Kama, later moving to the lower reaches of the Volga and operating in the Northern parts of the Caspian Sea in 1919 to 1920. She was stricken on 16 August 1922 and handed over for scrapping.

== See also ==
- List of destroyers of the Imperial Russian Navy
