= Russian destroyer Kapitan Yurasovsky =

Imperial Russian and Soviet destroyer

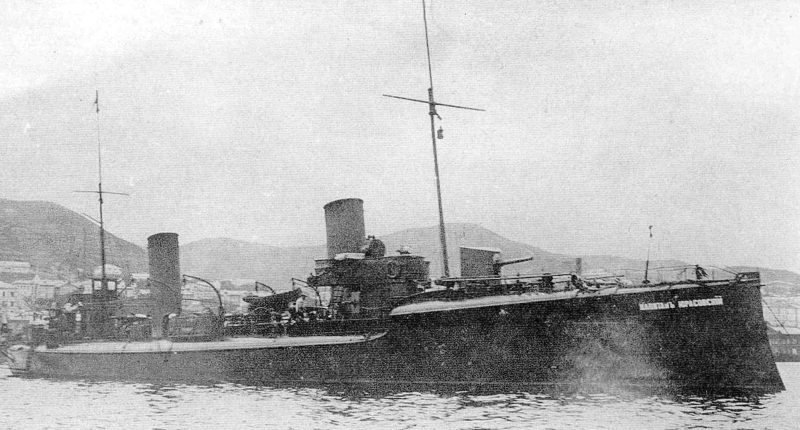

History

Russian Empire
- Name: Kapitan Yurasovsky
- Builder: Schichau-Werke, Elbląg, German Empire
- Laid down: 31 December 1904
- Launched: 1907
- Completed: 1907
- Fate: Scrapped, 24 June 1924

General characteristics (as built)
- Class & type: Inzhener-mekhanik Zverev-class destroyer
- Displacement: 375 t (369 long tons) (deep load)
- Length: 63.37 m (207 ft 11 in)
- Beam: 7.01 m (23 ft)
- Draft: 2.71 m (8 ft 11 in) (deep load)
- Installed power: 4 Schulz-Normand boilers; 6,000 ihp (4,474 kW)
- Propulsion: 2 shafts; 2 triple-expansion steam engines
- Speed: 27 knots (50 km/h; 31 mph)
- Range: 1,200 nmi (2,200 km; 1,400 mi) at 12 knots (22 km/h; 14 mph)
- Complement: 68
- Armament: 2 × single 75 mm (3 in) guns; 4 × single 47 mm (1.9 in) guns; 6 × single 7.62 mm (0.30 in) machine guns; 3 × single 450 mm (17.7 in) torpedo tubes

Kapitan Yurasovsky (Russian: Капитан Юрасовский) was a Inzhener-mekhanik Zverev-class destroyer built for the Imperial Russian Navy in the German Empire during the first decade of the 20th century. Completed in 1907, she initially served in the Pacific Fleet, then the Arctic Flotilla and participated in the First World War.

== Design and description ==
Kapitan Yurasovsky displaced 375 metric tons (369 long tons) at full load. She measured 63.37 meters (207 ft 11 in) long overall with a beam of 7.01 meters (23 ft 0 in), and a draft of 2.71 meters (8 ft 11 in). The ships were propelled by two vertical triple-expansion steam engines, each driving one propeller shaft using steam from four Schulz-Normand boilers. The engines were designed to produce a total of 6,000 indicated horsepower (4,500 kW) for an intended maximum speed of 27 knots (50 km/h; 31 mph). During Kapitan Yurasovsky's sea trials, she became the only ship of her class to fail to make her constract speed, reaching only 26 knots (48 km/h; 30 mph) from 5,960 ihp (4,440 kW). The ship carried enough coal to give her a range of 1,200 nautical miles (2,200 km; 1,400 mi) at 12 knots (22 km/h; 14 mph). Her crew numbered 68 officers and men.

The main armament of the Inzhener-mekhanik Zverev class consisted of two 50-caliber 75-millimeter (3 in) guns, one gun each at the forecastle and stern. Their secondary armament included four 47-millimeter (1.9 in) guns, two guns on each broadside. One pair was abreast the forward superstructure and the other between the aft superstructure and the stern gun. All of the guns were fitted with gun shields. Kapitan Yurasovsky carried six 7.62 mm (0.30 in) machine guns. The ships were equipped with three 450-millimeter (17.7 in) torpedo tubes in rotating mounts. The forward mount was located behind the forward funnel while the other two were fore and aft of the rear funnel.

== Construction and career ==
Kapitan Yurasovsky was laid down on 31 December 1904 by Schichau-Werke at their shipyard in Elbing, East Prussia, but she was disassembled and shipped by rail to Vladivostok where she was assembled. The ship was launched in 1907 and entered service later that year with the Pacific Fleet. She was transferred to the Arctic Flotilla in 1917.

== Bibliography ==
- Afonin, N. N. (2011). "Destroyers of the Kasatka and Mechanical Engineer Zverev Types". Gangut (in Russian). 25: 1–71.
- Apalkov, Yu. V. (1996). Боевые корабли русского флота: 8.1914-10.1917г [Combat Ships of the Russian Fleet: 8.1914-10.1917] (in Russian). Saint Petersburg, Russia: ИНТЕК. ISBN 5-7559-0018-3.
- Berezhnoy, S.S. (2002). Крейсера и Миносцы: Справочик [Cruisers and Destroyers: A Directory] (in Russian). Moscow: Ввоенное Ииздательство. ISBN 5-203-01780-8.
- Breyer, Siegfried (1992). Soviet Warship Development: Volume 1: 1917–1937. London: Conway Maritime Press. ISBN 0-85177-604-3.
- Budzbon, Przemysław (1985). "Russia". In Gray, Randal (ed.). Conway's All the World's Fighting Ships 1906–1921. Annapolis, Maryland: Naval Institute Press. pp. 291–325. ISBN 0-85177-245-5.
- Campbell, N. J. M. (1979). "Russia". In Chesneau, Roger & Kolesnik, Eugene M. (eds.). Conway's All the World's Fighting Ships 1860–1905. New York: Mayflower Books. pp. 170–217. ISBN 0-8317-0302-4.
- Halpern, Paul G. (1994). A Naval History of World War I. London: UCL Press. ISBN 1-85728-498-4.
- Harris, Mark (2025). The First World War in the Baltic Sea. Vol. 1: Essen's Triumph, 1914 to February 1915. Helion. ISBN 978-1-804519-10-3.
- Watts, Anthony J. (1990). The Imperial Russian Navy. London: Arms and Armour. ISBN 0-85368-912-1.
