= Russian destroyer Vnushitelny (1906) =

Imperial Russian and Soviet destroyer

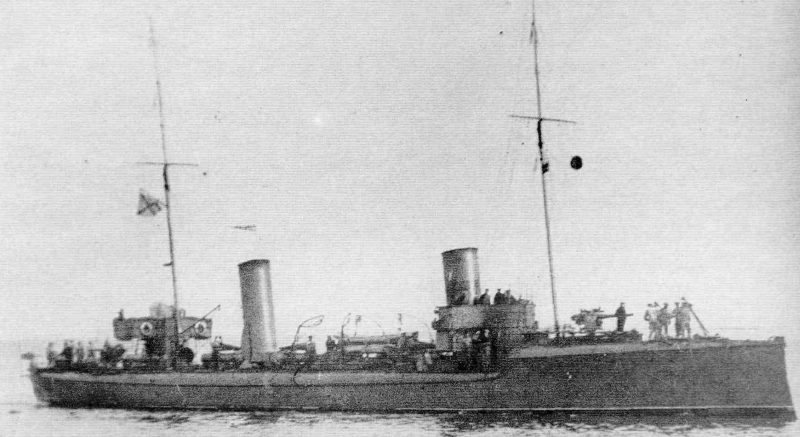

History

Russian Empire
- Name: Vnushitelny
- Builder: Schichau-Werke, Elbląg, German Empire
- Laid down: 3 August 1905
- Launched: 18 March 1906
- Completed: 1906

General characteristics (as built)
- Class & type: Inzhener-mekhanik Zverev-class destroyer
- Displacement: 450 t (440 long tons) (deep load)
- Length: 63.55 m (208 ft 6 in)
- Beam: 7.01 m (23 ft)
- Draft: 3 m (9 ft 10 in) (deep load)
- Installed power: 4 Schulz-Thornycroft boilers; 6,000 ihp (4,474 kW)
- Propulsion: 2 shafts; 2 triple-expansion steam engines
- Speed: 27 knots (50 km/h; 31 mph)
- Range: 960 nmi (1,780 km; 1,100 mi) at 12 knots (22 km/h; 14 mph)
- Complement: 70
- Armament: 2 × single 75 mm (3 in) guns; 4 × single 47 mm (1.9 in) guns; 3 × single 450 mm (17.7 in) torpedo tubes

Vnushitelny (Russian: Внушительный) was a Inzhener-mekhanik Zverev-class destroyer built for the Imperial Russian Navy in the German Empire during the first decade of the 20th century. Completed in 1906, she served in the Baltic Fleet and participated in the First World War.

== Design and description ==
Vnushitelny normally displaced 350 metric tons (340 long tons) and 450 metric tons (440 long tons) at full load. They measured 63.55 meters (208 ft 6 in) long overall with a beam of 7.01 meters (23 ft 0 in), and a draft of 3 meters (9 ft 10 in). The ships were propelled by two vertical triple-expansion steam engines, each driving one propeller shaft using steam from four Schulz-Thornycroft boilers. The engines were designed to produce a total of 6,000 indicated horsepower (4,500 kW) for an intended maximum speed of 27 knots (50 km/h; 31 mph). During Vnushitelny's sea trials, she reached 27.87 knots (51.62 km/h; 32.07 mph) from 6,200 ihp (4,600 kW). The ship carried enough coal to give her a range of 960 nautical miles (1,780 km; 1,100 mi) at 12 knots (22 km/h; 14 mph). Her crew numbered 70 officers and men.

The main armament of the Inzhener-mekhanik Zverev class consisted of two 50-caliber 75-millimeter (3 in) guns, one gun each at the forecastle and stern. Their secondary armament included four 47-millimeter (1.9 in) guns, two guns on each broadside. One pair was abreast the forward superstructure and the other between the aft superstructure and the stern gun. All of the guns were fitted with gun shields. The ships were equipped with three 450-millimeter (17.7 in) torpedo tubes in rotating mounts. The forward mount was located behind the forward funnel while the other two were fore and aft of the rear funnel.

In 1910–1911 the ships were rearmed with a pair of 102-millimeter (4 in) Pattern 1911 Obukhov guns that replaced the 75 mm guns. All of the 57 mm guns were removed and six 7.62 mm (0.30 in) machine guns were added as were facilities for 15 mines.

== Construction and career ==
Vnushitelny was laid down on 3 August 1905 by Schichau-Werke at their shipyard in Elbing, East Prussia, and launched on 18 March 1906. She entered service a few months later.

== Bibliography ==
- Afonin, N. N. (2011). "Destroyers of the Kasatka and Mechanical Engineer Zverev Types". Gangut (in Russian). 25: 1–71.
- Apalkov, Yu. V. (1996). Боевые корабли русского флота: 8.1914-10.1917г [Combat Ships of the Russian Fleet: 8.1914-10.1917] (in Russian). Saint Petersburg, Russia: ИНТЕК. ISBN 5-7559-0018-3.
- Berezhnoy, S.S. (2002). Крейсера и Миносцы: Справочик [Cruisers and Destroyers: A Directory] (in Russian). Moscow: Ввоенное Ииздательство. ISBN 5-203-01780-8.
- Breyer, Siegfried (1992). Soviet Warship Development: Volume 1: 1917–1937. London: Conway Maritime Press. ISBN 0-85177-604-3.
- Budzbon, Przemysław (1985). "Russia". In Gray, Randal (ed.). Conway's All the World's Fighting Ships 1906–1921. Annapolis, Maryland: Naval Institute Press. pp. 291–325. ISBN 0-85177-245-5.
- Campbell, N. J. M. (1979). "Russia". In Chesneau, Roger & Kolesnik, Eugene M. (eds.). Conway's All the World's Fighting Ships 1860–1905. New York: Mayflower Books. pp. 170–217. ISBN 0-8317-0302-4.
- Halpern, Paul G. (1994). A Naval History of World War I. London: UCL Press. ISBN 1-85728-498-4.
- Harris, Mark (2025). The First World War in the Baltic Sea. Vol. 1: Essen's Triumph, 1914 to February 1915. Helion. ISBN 978-1-804519-10-3.
- Watts, Anthony J. (1990). The Imperial Russian Navy. London: Arms and Armour. ISBN 0-85368-912-1.
