= Soviet destroyer Boyevoy =

Boyevoy is the name of the following ships in the Soviet Navy:

- Soviet destroyer Boyevoy (1950), a Skory-class destroyer, sold to Indonesia, decommissioned 1973
- Soviet destroyer Boyevoy (1984), a Sovremenny-class destroyer decommissioned in 1998
