= Inzhener-mekhanik Zverev-class destroyer =

Early 20th-century Imperial Russian destroyer class

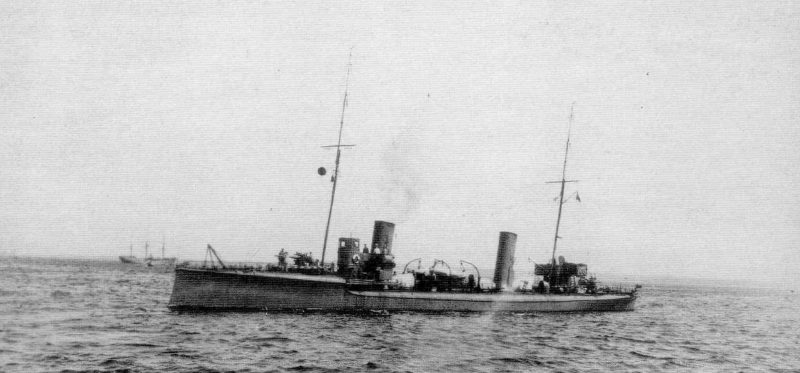
- Inzhener-mekhanik Zverev

Class overview
- Builders: Schichau-Werke, Elbląg, German Empire
- Operators: Imperial Russian Navy; (Russian Soviet Federative Socialist Republic) Red Fleet
- Built: 1904–1907
- In commission: 1905–1930
- Completed: 10
- Lost: 1
- Scrapped: 8

General characteristics (as built)
- Type: Destroyer
- Displacement: 450 t (440 long tons) (deep load)
- Length: 63.55 m (208 ft 6 in)
- Beam: 7.01 m (23 ft)
- Draft: 3 m (9 ft 10 in) (deep load)
- Installed power: 4 water-tube boilers; 6,000 ihp (4,474 kW)
- Propulsion: 2 shafts; 2 triple-expansion steam engines
- Speed: 27 knots (50 km/h; 31 mph)
- Range: 960 nmi (1,780 km; 1,100 mi) at 12 knots (22 km/h; 14 mph)
- Complement: 62
- Armament: 2 × single 75 mm (3 in) guns; 4 × single 47 mm (1.9 in) guns; 3 × single 450 mm (17.7 in) torpedo tubes

The Inzhener-mekhanik Zverev class (Russian: Инженер-механик Зверев) consisted of 10 destroyers built for the Imperial Russian Navy in the German Empire during the first decade of the 20th century. They participated in the First World War.

== Design and description ==
The Inzhener-mekhanik Zverev-class ships normally displaced 350 metric tons (340 long tons) and 450 metric tons (440 long tons) at full load. They measured 63.55 meters (208 ft 6 in) long overall with a beam of 7.01 meters (23 ft 0 in), and a draft of 3 meters (9 ft 10 in). The ships were propelled by two vertical triple-expansion steam engines, each driving one propeller shaft using steam from four Schulz-Thornycroft or Schichau boilers. The engines were designed to produce a total of 6,000 indicated horsepower (4,500 kW) for an intended maximum speed of 27 knots (50 km/h; 31 mph). During the ships' sea trials, they generally exceeded this figure, reaching 26–28.72 knots (48.15–53.19 km/h; 29.92–33.05 mph). The ships carried a maximum of 95-metric-ton (93-long-ton) of coal which gave them a range of 960 nautical miles (1,780 km; 1,100 mi) at 12 knots (22 km/h; 14 mph). Their crew numbered 70 officers and men.

The main armament of the Inzhener-mekhanik Zverev class consisted of two 50-caliber 75-millimeter (3 in) guns, one gun each at the forecastle and stern. Their secondary armament included four 47-millimeter (1.9 in) guns, two guns on each broadside. One pair was abreast the forward superstructure and the other between the aft superstructure and the stern gun. All of the guns were fitted with gun shields. The ships were equipped with three 450-millimeter (17.7 in) torpedo tubes in rotating mounts. The forward mount was located behind the forward funnel while the other two were fore and aft of the rear funnel.

In 1910–1911 the ships were rearmed with a pair of 102-millimeter (4 in) Pattern 1911 Obukhov guns that replaced the 75 mm guns. All of the 57 mm guns were removed and six 7.62 mm (0.30 in) machine guns were added as were facilities for 15 mines.

== Ships ==
Construction data
Name	Laid down	Launched	Entered Service	Fate
Inzhener-mekhanik Zverev	15 January 1905	7 October 1905	May 1906	Scrapped, 17 January 1930
Inzhener-mekhanik Dmitriev	26 January 1905	22 October 1905	1906	Scrapped, 18 November 1929
Boevoy	26 February 1905	27 December 1905	1906	Scrapped, 21 November 1925
Burny	25 March 1905	July 1906	1906	Scrapped, 21 November 1925
Vnimatelny	16 May 1905	7 February 1906	1906	Scrapped, 21 November 1925
Bditelny	26 February 1905	4 March 1906	1906	Sunk, 14 November 1917
Vnushitelny	3 August 1905	18 March 1906	1906	Scrapped, 1925
Vynoslivy	3 August 1905	18 March 1906	1906	Scrapped,
Kapitan Yurasovsky	31 December 1904	1907		Scrapped, 24 June 1924
Leytenant Sergeyev	8 January 1905	1907		Scrapped, 24 June 1924

== Bibliography ==
- Afonin, N. N. (2011). "Destroyers of the Kasatka and Mechanical Engineer Zverev Types". Gangut (in Russian). 25: 1–71.
- Apalkov, Yu. V. (1996). Боевые корабли русского флота: 8.1914-10.1917г [Combat ships of the Russian fleet: 8.1914-10.1917] (in Russian). Saint Petersburg, Russia: ИНТЕК. ISBN 5-7559-0018-3.
- Berezhnoy, S.S. (2002). Крейсера и Миносцы: Справочик [Cruisers and Destroyers: A Directory] (in Russian). Moscow: Ввоенное Ииздательство. ISBN 5-203-01780-8.
- Breyer, Siegfried (1992). Soviet Warship Development: Volume 1: 1917–1937. London: Conway Maritime Press. ISBN 0-85177-604-3.
- Budzbon, Przemysław (1985). "Russia". In Gray, Randal (ed.). Conway's All the World's Fighting Ships 1906–1921. Annapolis, Maryland: Naval Institute Press. pp. 291–325. ISBN 0-85177-245-5.
- Campbell, N. J. M. (1979). "Russia". In Chesneau, Roger & Kolesnik, Eugene M. (eds.). Conway's All the World's Fighting Ships 1860–1905. New York: Mayflower Books. pp. 170–217. ISBN 0-8317-0302-4.
- Halpern, Paul G. (1994). A Naval History of World War I. London: UCL Press. ISBN 1-85728-498-4.
- Harris, Mark (2025). The First World War in the Baltic Sea. Vol. 1: Essen's Triumph, 1914 to February 1915. Helion. ISBN 978-1-804519-10-3.
- Watts, Anthony J. (1990). The Imperial Russian Navy. London: Arms and Armour. ISBN 0-85368-912-1.
