= List of ship launches in 1905 =

The list of ship launches in 1905 includes a chronological list of ships launched in 1905.

Date	Ship	Class	Builder	Location	Country	Notes
5 January	Irma	Passenger ship		Middlesbrough, England	United Kingdom	
21 January	Iberia	Cargo liner	Blyth Shipbuilding & Dry Docks Co. Ltd	Blyth	United Kingdom	For J. Hall Jr. & Co Ltd
5 February	Louisiane	Mixed cargo passenger carrier	Ateliers et Chantiers de France	Dunkirk	France	For Compagnie Générale Transatlantique
6 February	Libellule	Torpedo launch	Forges et Chantiers de la Méditerranée	Le Havre	France	For French Navy
21 February	Carmania	Ocean liner	J. & G. Thompson Ltd	Clydebank	United Kingdom	For Cunard Line
23 February	Aragon	Passenger ship	Harland & Wolff	Belfast	United Kingdom	For Royal Mail Line
9 March	Bologna	Passenger ship	Harland & Wolff	Belfast	United Kingdom	For Hamburg America Line
21 March	La Provence	Steamship	Chantiers et Ateliers de Saint‑Nazaire–Penhoët	Saint-Nazaire	France	For Compagnie Générale Transatlantique
21 March	Leipzig	Bremen-class cruiser	AG Weser	Bremen	Germany	For Imperial German Navy
5 April	Dieppe	Passenger ferry	Fairfield Shipbuilding and Engineering Company	Govan	United Kingdom	For London, Brighton and South Coast Railway
8 April	Minnesota	Connecticut-class battleship	Newport News Shipbuilding	Newport News	United States	For United States Navy
14 April	Truite	Naïade-class submarine	Arsenal de Toulon	Toulon	France	for the French Navy
19 April	Liberté	Liberté-class battleship	Ateliers et Chantiers de la Loire	Saint-Nazaire	France	
20 April	Amerika	Ocean liner	Harland & Wolff	Belfast	Germany	For Hamburg America Line
4 May	Karina	Passenger liner	Alexander Stephen and Sons	Linthouse	United Kingdom	For African Steamship Company
6 May	Torpilleur N° 306	38‑metre type Normand (1903 tranche) torpedo boat	Forges et Chantiers de la Méditerranée	Le Havre	France	For French Navy
20 May	Africa	King Edward VII-class battleship	Chatham Dockyard	Gillingham/Chatham	United Kingdom	For Royal Navy
21 May	Erzherzog Ferdinand Max	Erzherzog Karl-class battleship	Stabilimento Tecnico Triestino	Trieste	Austria-Hungary	For Austro-Hungarian Navy
31 May	—	Floating dock (Arsenal de Cherbourg)	Forges et Chantiers de la Méditerranée	Le Havre	France	For French Navy
10 June	Oscar II	Unique coastal defence ship	Lindholmens Shipyard	Lindholmen, Gothenburg	Sweden	For Royal Swedish Navy
17 June	Hibernia	King Edward VII-class battleship	Devonport Dockyards	Devonport, Plymouth	United Kingdom	For Royal Navy
17 June	Maharonda	Cargo ship	Harland & Wolff	Belfast	United Kingdom	For T. & J. Brocklebank
6 July	Slieve Bawn	Ferry	Harland & Wolff	Belfast	United Kingdom	For London & North Western Railway
17 July	Torpilleur N° 307	38‑metre type Normand (1903 tranche) torpedo boat	Forges et Chantiers de la Méditerranée	Le Havre	France	For French Navy
18 July	Ravenstone	Cargo ship	Blyth Shipbuilding & Dry Docks Co. Ltd	Blyth	United Kingdom	For Red 'R' Steamship Co. Ltd
21 July	Californie	Steamship	Ateliers et Chantiers de France	Dunkirk	France	For Compagnie Générale Transatlantique
22 July	J.M.H. No. 1	Lighter	Brown & Clapson	Barton-upon-Humber	United Kingdom	For John M. Hamilton & Co. Ltd
24 July	Y	Submarine	Arsenal de Toulon	Toulon	France	For French Navy
26 July	Oasis	Motor yacht	Abel Le Marchand	Le Havre	France	For Georges Ancel
28 July	Truite	Naïade-class submarine	Arsenal de Toulon	Toulon	France	for the French Navy
29 July	Pamir	Barque	Blohm + Voss	Hamburg	Germany	For F. Laeisz
2 August	Elleray	Cargo ship	Blyth Shipbuilding & Dry Docks Co. Ltd	Blyth	United Kingdom	For Elleray Steamship Co. Ltd
2 August	Magne	Torpedo boat destroyer	Thornycroft	Chiswick, London	United Kingdom	For Royal Swedish Navy
3 August	Mexico	Steamship	Forges et Chantiers de la Méditerranée	Le Havre	France	For Compagnie Générale Transatlantique
12 August	Kansas	Connecticut-class battleship	New York Shipbuilding Corporation	Camden, New Jersey	United States	For United States Navy
31 August	Herefordshire	Passenger ship	Harland & Wolff	Belfast	United Kingdom	For Bibby Steamship Co
31 August	Vermont	Connecticut-class battleship	Fore River Shipyard	Quincy, Massachusetts	United States	For United States Navy
10 September	Napoli	Regina Elena-class battleship	Castellammare Royal Dockyard	Castellammare di Stabia	Italy	For Regia Marina
14 September	Vendée	Steel, screw steamer; 2,700 GRT	Forges et Chantiers de la Méditerranée	Le Havre	France	For Cie. de Navigation d'Orbigny
14 September	Dongola	Ocean liner	Barclay Curle	Whiteinch	United Kingdom	For Peninsular and Oriental Steam Navigation Company
23 September	Danzig	Bremen-class cruiser	Kaiserliche Werft	Danzig	Germany	For Imperial German Navy
28 September	Nieuw Amsterdam	Passenger ship	Harland & Wolff	Belfast	United Kingdom	For Holland America Line
29 September	Hannover	Deutschland-class battleship	Kaiserliche Werft	Wilhelmshaven	Germany	For Imperial German Navy
30 September	Aleksandr Kamburov	Cargo ship	Blyth Shipbuilding & Dry Docks Co. Ltd	Blyth	United Kingdom	For Northern Steamship Co
30 September	Mississippi	Mississippi-class battleship	William Cramp & Sons	Philadelphia, Pennsylvania	United States	For United States Navy
28 October	Lovky	Leytenant Burakov-class destroyer	Chantiers et Ateliers Augustin Normand	Le Havre	France	For Imperial Russian Navy
11 November	Malakand	Cargo ship	Harland & Wolff	Belfast	United Kingdom	For T. & J. Brocklebank
14 November	Westfalen	Merchant	Joh. C. Tecklenborg		Germany	
23 November	Hudson	Passenger/cargo vessel	Chantiers de Normandie	Grand-Quevilly	France	For: Cie Générale Transatlantique
28 November	Oméga	Submarine	Arsenal de Toulon	Toulon	France	for the French Navy
29 November	Litoutchy	Leytenant Burakov-class destroyer	Chantiers et Ateliers Augustin Normand	Le Havre	France	For Imperial Russian Navy
November	Oswestry	Merchant	J.L. Thompson		United Kingdom	
2 December	Pommern	Deutschland-class battleship	AG Vulcan	Stettin	Germany	For Imperial German Navy
9 December	Idaho	Mississippi-class battleship	William Cramp & Sons	Philadelphia, Pennsylvania	United States	For United States Navy
12 December	Königsberg	Königsberg-class cruiser	Kaiserliche Werft	Kiel	Germany	For Imperial German Navy
14 December	Manipur	Cargo ship	Harland & Wolff	Belfast	United Kingdom	For T. & J. Brocklebank
16 December	Lyon	Havre type self‑propelled paddle‑wheel barge	Forges et Chantiers de la Méditerranée	Le Havre	France	For Soc. des Messageries fluviales de France
23 December	Marguerite Molois	Trawler	Chantiers de France	Dunkirk	France	For A.Joly, S.Duhamel and G. Vasse
26 December	Medomsley	Cargo ship	Blyth Shipbuilding & Dry Docks Co. Ltd	Blyth	United Kingdom	For Medomsley Steam Shipping Co. Ltd
27 December	Likhoi (Лихой)	Leytenant Burakov-class destroyer	Chantiers et Ateliers Augustin Normand	Le Havre	France	For Imperial Russian Navy
27 December	Europe	Cargo vessel	Ateliers et Chantiers de la Loire	Saint-Nazaire	France	For Chargeurs
Date unknown	Alice	Sloop	Brown & Clapson	Barton-upon-Humber	United Kingdom	For Joseph Oldridge
Date unknown	Archibald Russell	Barque	Scotts Shipbuilding and Engineering Co. Ltd	Greenock	United Kingdom	For J. Hardie & Company
Date unknown	Bronte	Tanker	Fratelli Orlando & Co.	Livorno	Italy	For Regia Marina
Date unknown	Marie	Steam drifter	Beeching Brothers Ltd	Great Yarmouth	United Kingdom	For Horatio Fenner Ltd
Date unknown	W. S. Fielding	Dredger	Government Shipyard	Sorel	Canada	For private owner
