= SM UC-78 =

1916 German Type UC II submarine

History

German Empire
- Name: UC-78
- Ordered: 12 January 1916
- Builder: AG Vulcan, Hamburg
- Yard number: 83
- Launched: 8 December 1916
- Commissioned: 10 January 1917
- Fate: Rammed and sunk, 9 May 1918

General characteristics
- Class & type: Type UC II submarine
- Displacement: 410 t (400 long tons), surfaced; 493 t (485 long tons), submerged
- Length: 50.45 m (165 ft 6 in) o/a; 40.30 m (132 ft 3 in) pressure hull
- Beam: 5.22 m (17 ft 2 in) o/a; 3.65 m (12 ft) pressure hull
- Draught: 3.65 m (12 ft)
- Propulsion: 2 × propeller shafts; 2 × 6-cylinder, 4-stroke diesel engines, 580–600 PS (430–440 kW; 570–590 shp); 2 × electric motors, 620 PS (460 kW; 610 shp)
- Speed: 11.8 knots (21.9 km/h; 13.6 mph), surfaced; 7.3 knots (13.5 km/h; 8.4 mph), submerged
- Range: 8,660–10,230 nmi (16,040–18,950 km; 9,970–11,770 mi) at 7 knots (13 km/h; 8.1 mph) surfaced; 52 nmi (96 km; 60 mi) at 4 knots (7.4 km/h; 4.6 mph) submerged
- Test depth: 50 m (160 ft)
- Complement: 26
- Armament: 6 × 100 cm (39.4 in) mine tubes; 18 × UC 200 mines; 3 × 50 cm (19.7 in) torpedo tubes (2 bow/external; one stern); 7 × torpedoes; 1 × 8.8 cm (3.5 in) Uk L/30 deck gun
- Notes: 30-second diving time

Service record
- Part of: Baltic Flotilla; 10 January 1917 – 18 January 1918; Flandern I Flotilla; 18 January – 9 May 1918
- Commanders: Oblt.z.S. / Kptlt. Hans Kukat; 10 January 1917 – 15 January 1918; Oblt.z.S. Werner Löwe; 16 – 18 January 1918; Kptlt. Hans Kukat; 19 January – 9 May 1918
- Operations: 12 patrols
- Victories: 1 warship sunk (350 tons); 1 merchant ship damaged (1,481 GRT)

SM UC-78 was a German Type UC II minelaying submarine or U-boat in the German Imperial Navy (German: Kaiserliche Marine) during World War I. The U-boat was ordered on 12 January 1916 and was launched on 8 December 1916. She was commissioned into the German Imperial Navy on 10 January 1917 as SM UC-78. (Note: "SM" stands for "Seiner Majestät" (English: His Majesty's) and combined with the U for Unterseeboot would be translated as His Majesty's Submarine.) In twelve patrols UC-78 was credited with sinking 1 warship, either by torpedo or by mines laid. UC-78 was rammed and sunk by the British steamer Queen Alexandra west of Cherbourg on 9 May 1918.

== Design ==
A Type UC II submarine, UC-78 had a displacement of 410 tonnes (400 long tons) when at the surface and 493 tonnes (485 long tons) while submerged. She had a length overall of 50.45 m (165 ft 6 in), a beam of 5.22 m (17 ft 2 in), and a draught of 3.65 m (12 ft). The submarine was powered by two six-cylinder four-stroke diesel engines each producing 290–300 metric horsepower (210–220 kW; 290–300 shp) (a total of 580–600 metric horsepower (430–440 kW; 570–590 shp)), two electric motors producing 620 metric horsepower (460 kW; 610 shp), and two propeller shafts. She had a dive time of 30 seconds and was capable of operating at a depth of 50 metres (160 ft).

The submarine had a maximum surface speed of 11.8 knots (21.9 km/h; 13.6 mph) and a submerged speed of 7.3 knots (13.5 km/h; 8.4 mph). When submerged, she could operate for 52 nautical miles (96 km; 60 mi) at 4 knots (7.4 km/h; 4.6 mph); when surfaced, she could travel 8,660 to 10,230 nautical miles (16,040 to 18,950 km; 9,970 to 11,770 mi) at 7 knots (13 km/h; 8.1 mph). UC-78 was fitted with six 100 centimetres (39 in) mine tubes, eighteen UC 200 mines, three 50 centimetres (20 in) torpedo tubes (one on the stern and two on the bow), seven torpedoes, and one 8.8 cm (3.5 in) Uk L/30 deck gun. Her complement was twenty-six crew members.

== Summary of raiding history ==
Date	Name	Nationality	Tonnage (Note: Merchant ship tonnages are in gross register tons. Military vessels are listed by tons displacement.)	Fate
12 August 1917	Leytenant Burakov	Imperial Russian Navy	350	Sunk
4 April 1918	Eustratios	Greece	1,481	Damaged
