= Leytenant Burakov-class destroyer =

Early 20th-century Imperial Russian destroyer class

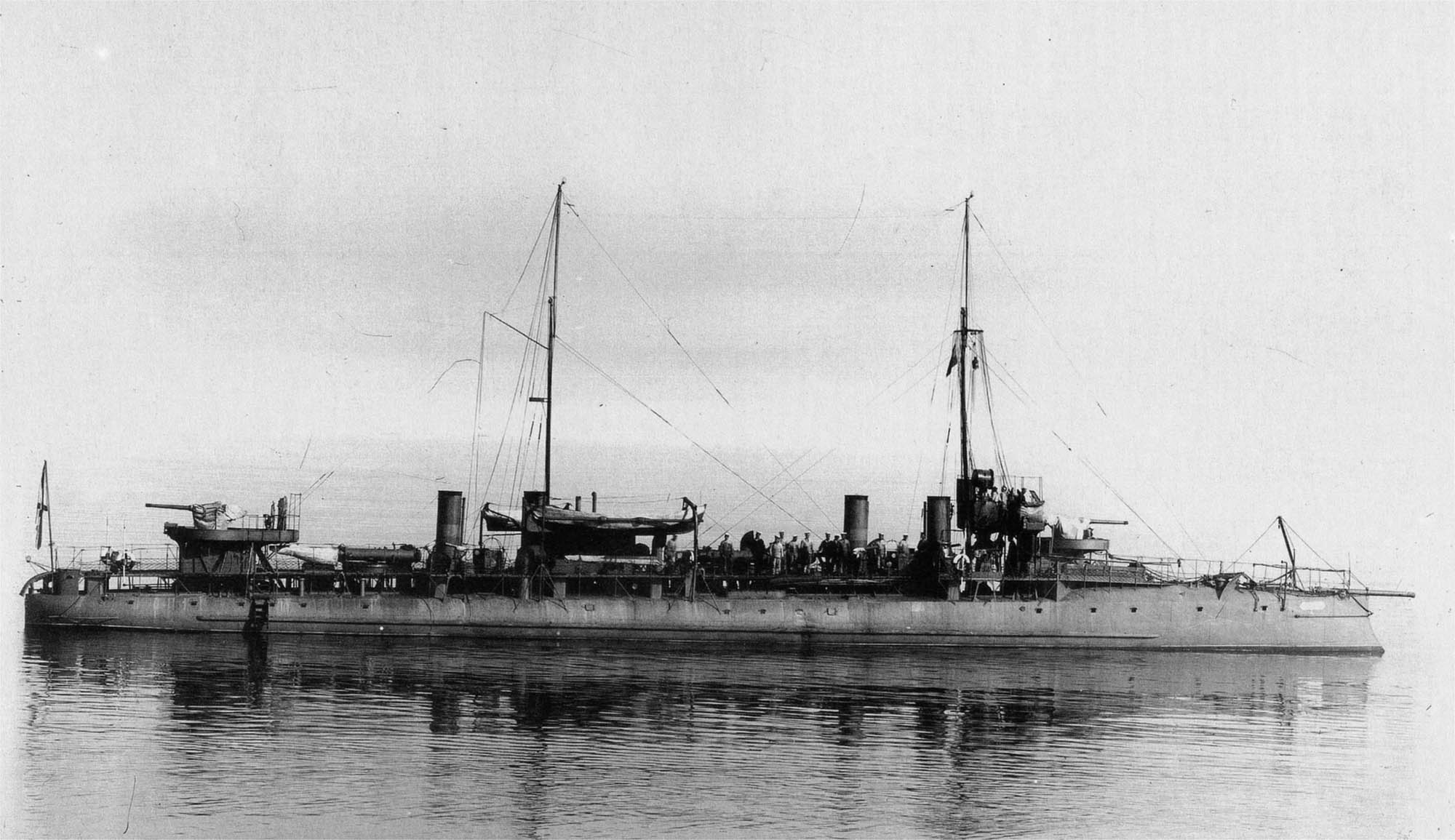
- Metky

Class overview
- Operators: Imperial Russian Navy; (Russian Soviet Federative Socialist Republic) Red Fleet
- Built: 1904–1906
- In commission: 1906–1925
- Completed: 11
- Lost: 3
- Scrapped: 8

General characteristics
- Type: Destroyer
- Displacement: 402 t (396 long tons)
- Length: 56.44 m (185 ft 2 in)
- Beam: 6.4 m (21 ft)
- Draft: 3.21 m (10 ft 6 in) (deep load)
- Installed power: 4 Normand boilers; 6,000 ihp (4,474 kW)
- Propulsion: 2 shafts; 2 triple-expansion steam engines
- Speed: 26 knots (48 km/h; 30 mph)
- Range: 1,080 nmi (2,000 km; 1,240 mi) at 14 knots (26 km/h; 16 mph)
- Complement: 67
- Armament: 2 × single 75 mm (3 in) guns; 6 × single 7.62 mm (0.30 in) machine guns; 2 × single 450 mm (17.7 in) torpedo tubes

The Leytenant Burakov class (Russian: Лейтенант Бураков) consisted of 11 destroyers built for the Imperial Russian Navy in France during the first decade of the 20th century. They served in the Baltic Fleet and participated in the First World War.

== Design and description ==
The Leytenant Burakov-class ships displaced 402–405 metric tons (396–399 long tons)at normal load. They measured 56.44–56.72 meters (185 ft 2 in – 186 ft 1 in) long overall with a beam of 6.35–6.4 meters (20 ft 10 in – 21 ft 0 in), and a draft of 3.2–3.35 meters (10 ft 6 in – 11 ft 0 in). The ships were propelled by two 4-cylinder vertical triple-expansion steam engines, each driving one propeller shaft using steam from four Normand boilers. The turbines were designed to produce a total of 6,000 indicated horsepower (4,500 kW) for an intended maximum speed of 26 knots (48 km/h; 30 mph). During the ships' sea trials, they generally exceeded this figure, reaching up to 27.6 knots (51.1 km/h; 31.8 mph). The ships normally carried 80 metric tons (79 long tons) of coal, but could carry a maximum of 100 t (98 long tons). Range figures varied widely between the ships, but Likhoy and Letuchy had ranges of 1,080 nautical miles (2,000 km; 1,240 mi) at 14 knots (26 km/h; 16 mph). Their crew numbered 67 officers and men.

The main armament of the Leytanant Burakov class consisted of two 50-caliber 75-millimeter (3 in) guns, one gun each on the roofs of the forward and rear conning towers. They were also equipped with six 7.62-millimeter (0.30 in) machine guns. The ships were fitted with two single 450-millimeter (17.7 in) torpedo tubes. The forward mount was positioned between the funnels and the rear one was aft of the rear pair of funnels.

== Ships ==
Construction data
Name	Laid down	Launched	Entered Service	Fate
Leytenant Burakov	1904	20 June 1905	December 1905	Sunk, 12 August 1917
Metky	1905	24 June 1905	1906	Scrapped, 21 November 1925
Molodetsky	1905	15 September 1905	January 1906	Scrapped, 1925
Moshchny	1905	10 March 1905	December 1905	Scrapped, 1923
Iskusny	1905	11 July 1905	January 1906	Scrapped, 1922
Ispolnitelny	1905	30 July 1905	January 1906	Sunk, 12 December 1914
Krepky	1905	24 August 1905	1906	Scrapped, 1925
Lyogky	1905	27 September 1905	September 1906	Scrapped, 1924
Lovky	1905	15 October 1905	April 1906	Scrapped, 1925
Letuchy	1905	16 November 1905	April 1906	Capsized, 12 December 1914
Likhoy	1905	13 December 1905	April 1906	Scrapped, 21 November 1925

== Bibliography ==
- Apalkov, Yu. V. (1996). Боевые корабли русского флота: 8.1914-10.1917г [Combat ships of the Russian fleet: 8.1914-10.1917] (in Russian). Saint Petersburg, Russia: ИНТЕК. ISBN 5-7559-0018-3.
- Berezhnoy, S.S. (2002). Крейсера и Миносцы: Справочик [Cruisers and Destroyers: A Directory] (in Russian). Moscow: Ввоенное Ииздательство. ISBN 5-203-01780-8.
- Breyer, Siegfried (1992). Soviet Warship Development: Volume 1: 1917–1937. London: Conway Maritime Press. ISBN 0-85177-604-3.
- Budzbon, Przemysław (1985). "Russia". In Gray, Randal (ed.). Conway's All the World's Fighting Ships 1906–1921. Annapolis, Maryland: Naval Institute Press. pp. 291–325. ISBN 0-85177-245-5.
- Campbell, N. J. M. (1979). "Russia". In Chesneau, Roger & Kolesnik, Eugene M. (eds.). Conway's All the World's Fighting Ships 1860–1905. New York: Mayflower Books. pp. 170–217. ISBN 0-8317-0302-4.
- Halpern, Paul G. (1994). A Naval History of World War I. London: UCL Press. ISBN 1-85728-498-4.
- Harris, Mark (2025). The First World War in the Baltic Sea. Vol. 1: Essen's Triumph, 1914 to February 1915. Helion. ISBN 978-1-804519-10-3.
- Watts, Anthony J. (1990). The Imperial Russian Navy. London: Arms and Armour. ISBN 0-85368-912-1.
