= Mexican corvette Zaragoza =

- Buque Escuela Zaragoza

History

Mexico
- Name: Zaragoza
- Builder: Forges et Chantiers de la Méditerranée, Le Havre, France
- Launched: 9 April 1891
- Commissioned: 1892
- Decommissioned: 6 March 1926
- Motto: Siempre a la hora; ("Always on time")
- Fate: Stripped and sunk, 1926

General characteristics
- Type: Corvette
- Displacement: 1,226 tons
- Length: 213 ft (64.92 m)
- Propulsion: Steam engine
- Sail plan: Barque
- Speed: 13 knots (24 km/h; 15 mph)
- Complement: 139
- Armament: 6 × Schneider-Canet 10 cm (3.9 in) cannon; 2 × 37 mm (1.5 in) Hotchkiss revolving cannon

Zaragoza was a corvette of the Mexican Navy in commission from 1892 until 1926. Although designed as a ship of war, she spent most of her active career serving as a training ship (buque escuela).

She represented Mexico at the quadricentennial celebrations of Columbus' first voyage, and circumnavigated the world in 1894–97. She saw action in various Mexican insurrections. She was decommissioned in 1926 and sunk.

== Construction ==
Zaragoza was ordered by the Mexican government and laid down in April 1890 as Porfirio Díaz at the Forges et Chantiers de la Méditerranée yard in Le Havre. She was launched on 9 April 1891.. She was a steel-hulled vessel, with sails and a steam engine, armed with six Schneider-Canet 10 cm (3.94 in) cannon and two 37 mm (1.46 in) Hotchkiss guns.

== Service history ==
=== Maiden voyage ===
The corvette was commissioned in France by Commodore Ángel Ortiz Monasterio, who sailed her across the Atlantic on her maiden voyage, arriving at Veracruz on 13 February 1892.

=== Columbian quadricentennial ===
Under the command of Captain Reginald Carey Brenton, an officer of the British Royal Navy on a five-year assignment to the Mexican Navy as an instructor, she sailed back to Europe in October 1892. At the Spanish port of Palos de la Frontera, from where the Pinta, Niña, and Santa María sailed in 1492, she attended the commemorations of the fourth centenary of the discovery of the Americas. Zaragoza acted as guard to the Spanish Royal Yacht and was visited by Queen Regent Maria Christina of Spain.

=== Global circumnavigation ===
On returning to Mexico Zaragoza made two further voyages, to New Orleans and to France, before becoming the first Mexican Navy ship to circumnavigate the world. She sailed from Tampico on 5 April 1894, still under Captain Brenton's command, south along the coast of South America and through the Strait of Magellan, and then back north to Acapulco. On 23 April 1895, now again under the command of Commodore Ortiz, she sailed from Guaymas. After visiting San Francisco she sailed west across the Pacific, calling at Hawaii, Japan and Hong Kong, before stopping at Singapore, India and Egypt. She sailed through the Suez Canal entered the Mediterranean Sea, and headed for France. After minor repairs she crossed the Atlantic and arrived at Veracruz on 3 July 1897. An account of the voyage was published by Zaragoza's medical officer Dr. Carlos Glass.

=== War in Yucatán ===
Between 1898 and 1905 Zaragoza took part in operations against the Maya rebels of Yucatán, transporting troops, supplies, and ammunition to ports along the coast. In 1905 Zaragoza was part of the squadron that accompanied President Porfirio Díaz in his visit to Yucatán.

=== Mexican Revolution ===
During the Mexican Revolution Zaragoza served under the constitutional government of President Francisco I. Madero and assisted in suppressing the revolt led by Félix Díaz. In April 1914, Zaragoza was at Tampico when United States troops landed in nearby Veracruz, but took no offensive action. In August 1914, after the Constitutionalist revolution led by Venustiano Carranza, Zaragoza was sent to the Port of Coatzacoalcos. From there, later in the year, she sailed to Yucatán to take part in the suppression of the rebellion led by Benjamin Argumedo. In 1923–24, Zaragoza took part in Adolfo de la Huerta's failed uprising against the government of Álvaro Obregón.

=== Cortege ===
In October 1919 she escorted the Uruguayan cruiser Uruguay, as she returned the remains of the poet Amado Nervo, who died while serving as Mexico's ambassador to Uruguay.

== Decommissioning ==
After 34 years service, and in poor condition, the Zaragoza was finally decommissioned on 6 March 1926 in a ceremony led by the Secretary of War Joaquín Amaro. The ship was subsequently stripped, and the hulk towed to sea to be sunk by gunfire.
