= Spanish monitor Puigcerdá =

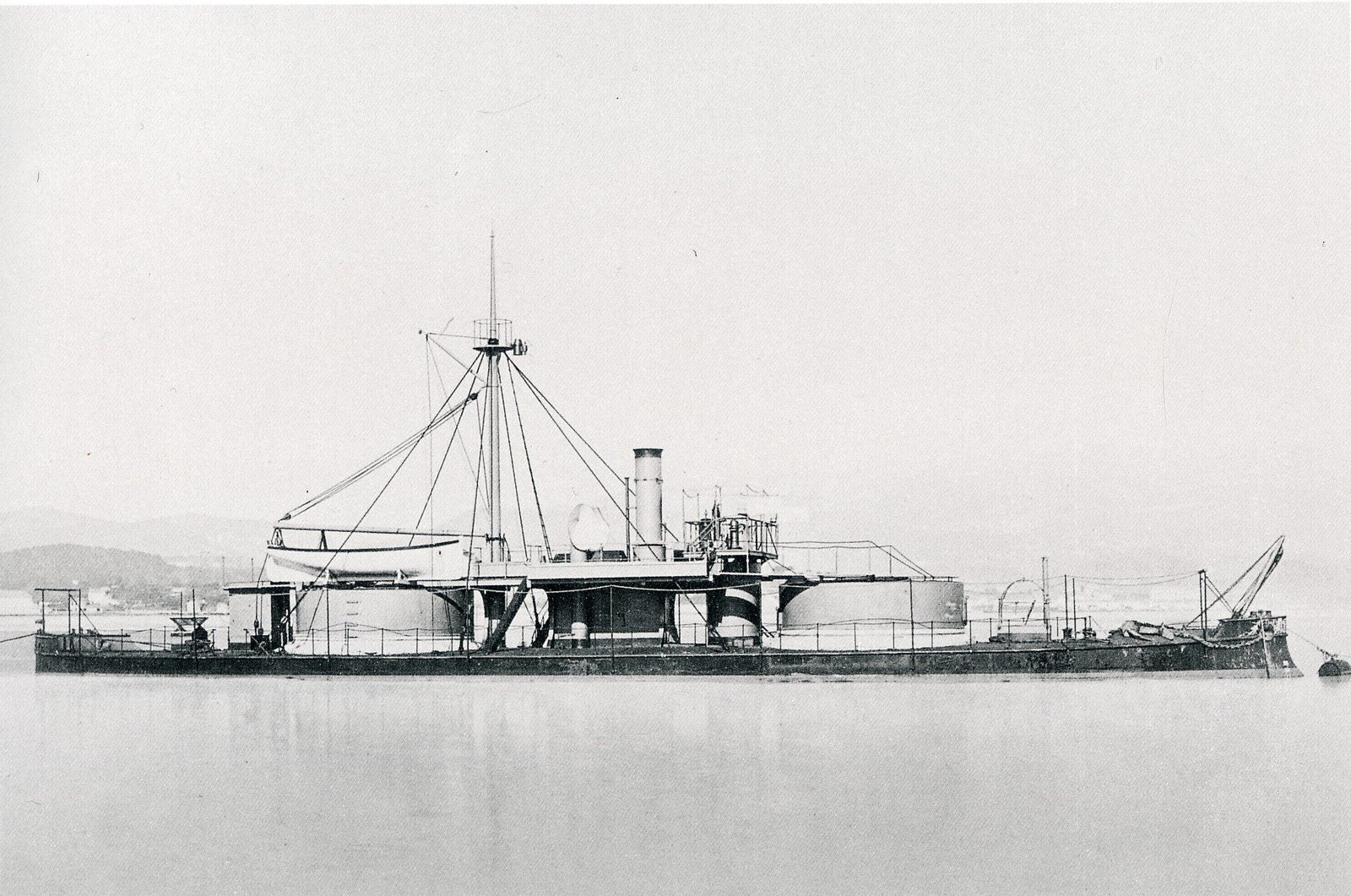

History

Spain
- Name: Puigcerdá
- Namesake: Capital of Cerdanya
- Builder: Forges et Chantiers de la Méditerranée
- Cost: 840,000 pesetas
- Laid down: 28 September 1874
- Launched: 19 November 1874
- Commissioned: 1875
- Decommissioned: 1890
- Recommissioned: 1898
- Decommissioned: 1900
- Fate: Sold off and converted into the cargo ship "Anita"

General characteristics
- Type: Monitor
- Displacement: 553 tons
- Length: 41 m (135 ft)
- Beam: 9 m (30 ft)
- Draft: 2 m (6.6 ft)
- Installed power: 530 ihp
- Speed: 8 knots
- Complement: 59 officers and enlisted
- Armament: (1874 as built); 1 × 12 cm (4.72 in) bronze guns; 2 × 10 cm (3.94 in) bronze guns; (1898 as rearmed); 2 × 16-centimetre (6.30 in) guns; 2 × 12-centimetre (4.72 in) guns.
- Armor: Iron.; Belt 3.93 inches (100mm); Shields 3.14-3.93 inches (80-100 mm).
- Notes: 23 tons of coal

The Puigcerdá was the only monitor ever commissioned in the history of the Spanish Armada, and was acquired to defend the estuary of Bilbao and the coast of Cantabria during the Third Carlist War, at a price of 840,000 pesetas.

== Construction and naming ==
The acquisition of Puigcerdá was approved on August 25, 1874, by General Serrano and Minister of Marine Rafael Rodriguez Arias. The contract for the construction of the ship was signed September 11, 1874, with the ship to be built in the shipyard of the Forges et Chantiers de la Méditerranée, in La Seyne, Toulon, France.

By a Royal Order dated October 30, 1874 it was ordered that the ship be given the name:

"...Puigcerdá, thus perpetuating in the Navy one of the memorable events of this civil war that unfortunately divides us"

== Third Carlist War service ==
During the Third Carlist War, Puigcerdá defended the province of Vizcaya against Carlist troops. After the war the ship was laid up at Ferrol with the floating battery Duque de Tetuán, and was decommissioned in 1890.

== Spanish–American War ==
With the breaking out of the Spanish–American War in 1898, Puigcerdá was recommissioned and rearmed, and dispatched for the defense of the Ria de Vigo.

== Disposal ==
In 1900 Puigcerdá was decommissioned, and sold for 30,000 pesetas for civilian use as the cargo steamer Anita; later she was sold to John Holt & Co. of Liverpool.
