= Vitiaz-class cruiser =

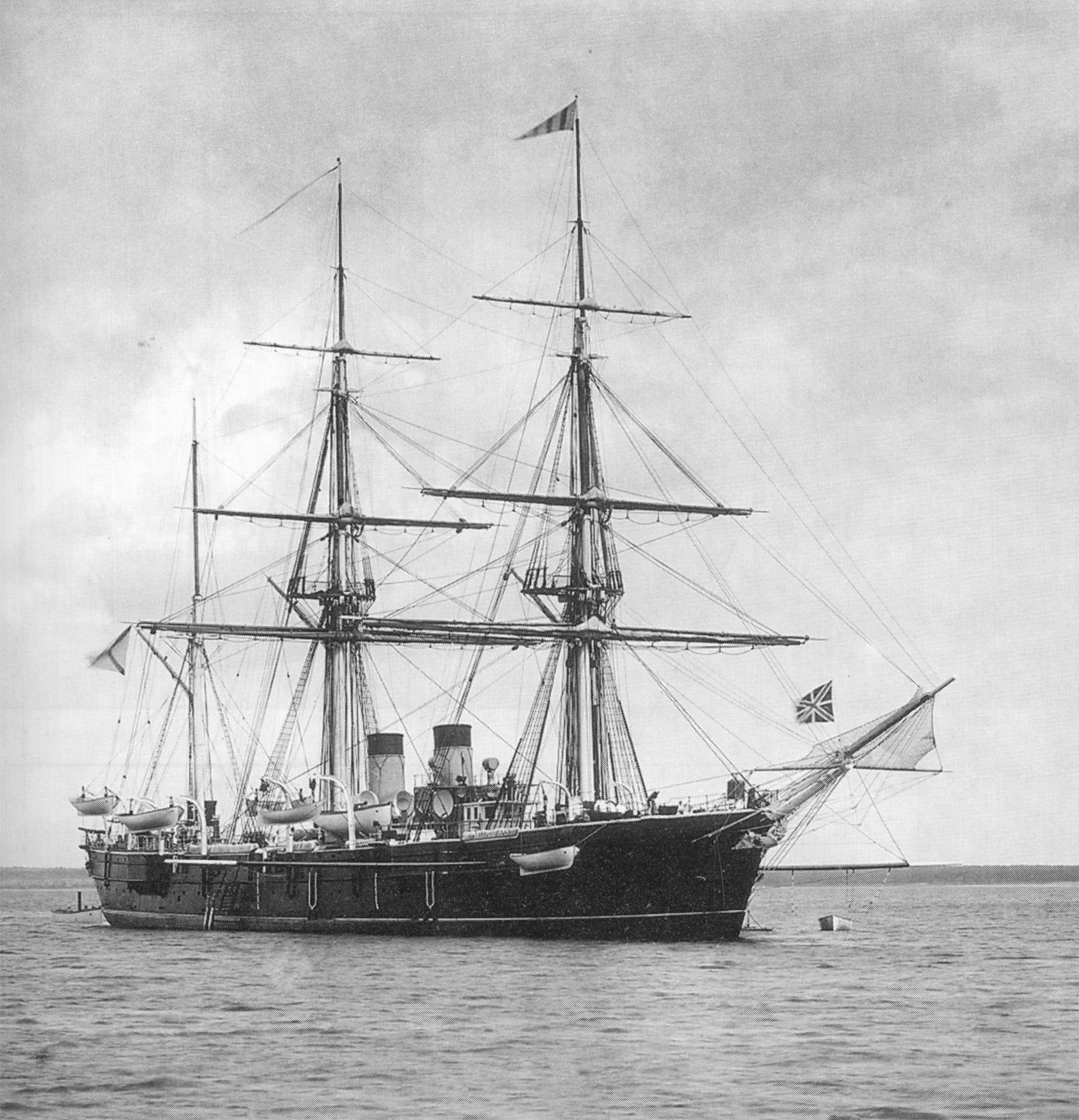
- Rynda

Class overview
- Operators: Imperial Russian Navy
- Preceded by: None
- Succeeded by: Admiral Kornilov
- Built: 1883–1887
- In commission: 1886–1914
- Completed: 2
- Lost: 1
- Scrapped: 1

General characteristics
- Type: Protected cruiser
- Displacement: 3,537 long tons (3,594 t)
- Length: 260 ft 6 in (79.4 m)
- Beam: 45 ft (13.7 m)
- Draft: 19 ft 11 in (6.1 m)
- Installed power: approximately 3,000 ihp (2,200 kW)
- Propulsion: 1 shaft, 1 Compound steam engine, 10 cylindrical water-tube boilers
- Speed: 14 knots (26 km/h; 16 mph)
- Complement: 330 officers and crewmen
- Armament: 10 × 1 - 6-inch (152 mm)/28 guns; 4 × 1 - 3.4-inch (86 mm) guns; 8 × 1 - 37-millimeter (1.5 in)/23 guns; 3 × 15-inch (381 mm) submerged torpedo tubes
- Armor: Deck: 1.5 in (38 mm)

The Vitiaz-class ships were a pair of partially protected cruisers built for the Imperial Russian Navy in the mid-1880s.
