= SS Malakand (1905) =

History
- Namesake: Malakand Agency
- Owner: Brocklebank Line
- Builder: Harland & Wolff
- Yard number: 373
- Launched: 11 November 1905
- Completed: 14 December 1906
- Fate: Sunk 20 April 1917

General characteristics
- Type: Cargo liner
- Tonnage: 7,653 GRT

SS Malakand was a 7,653-gross register ton cargo liner built by Harland & Wolff in 1905 for the Brocklebank shipping line, the first of two Brocklebank Line ships named after the Malakand area of the Indian subcontinent.

Malakand operated on a regular service between Liverpool, England, and Calcutta, India. During World War I, she was torpedoed and sunk in the Atlantic Ocean 145 nautical miles (269 km) west of Bishop Rock, Isles of Scilly (49°20′N 10°00′W), on 20 April 1917 by the Imperial German Navy submarine U-84 with the loss of one crew member.

A replacement ship of the same name, SS Malakand, was launched in 1919.
