= Société Nouvelle des Forges et Chantiers de la Méditerranée =

French shipbuilding company

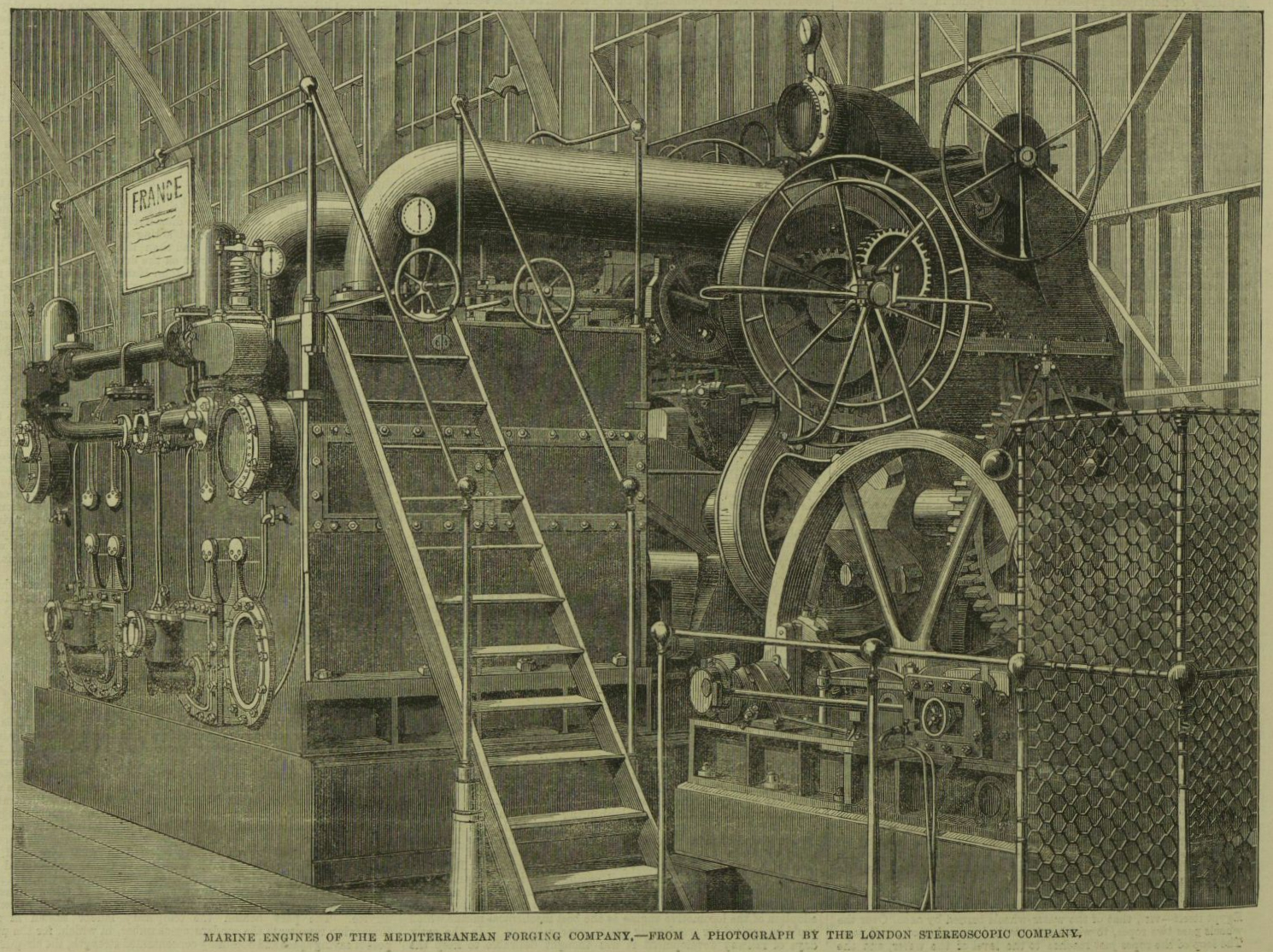
A marine engine built by the Société des Forges et Chantiers de la Méditerranée in 1862

The Société Nouvelle des Forges et Chantiers de la Méditerranée (FCM) was a French shipbuilding company. The Société des Forges et Chantiers de la Méditerranée was founded in 1853 by Philip Taylor and subsequently incorporated in 1856 in the newly established joint stock company Société Nouvelle des Forges et Chantiers de la Méditerranée founded by Armand Béhic. It eventually had shipyards in La Seyne-sur-Mer, near Toulon, and in Graville, now part of Le Havre. After going into insolvency in 1966, the company was absorbed into the Constructions industrielles de la Méditerranée.

The company also produced tanks before World War II, most notably FCM 2C and FCM 36.

== Some ships built ==
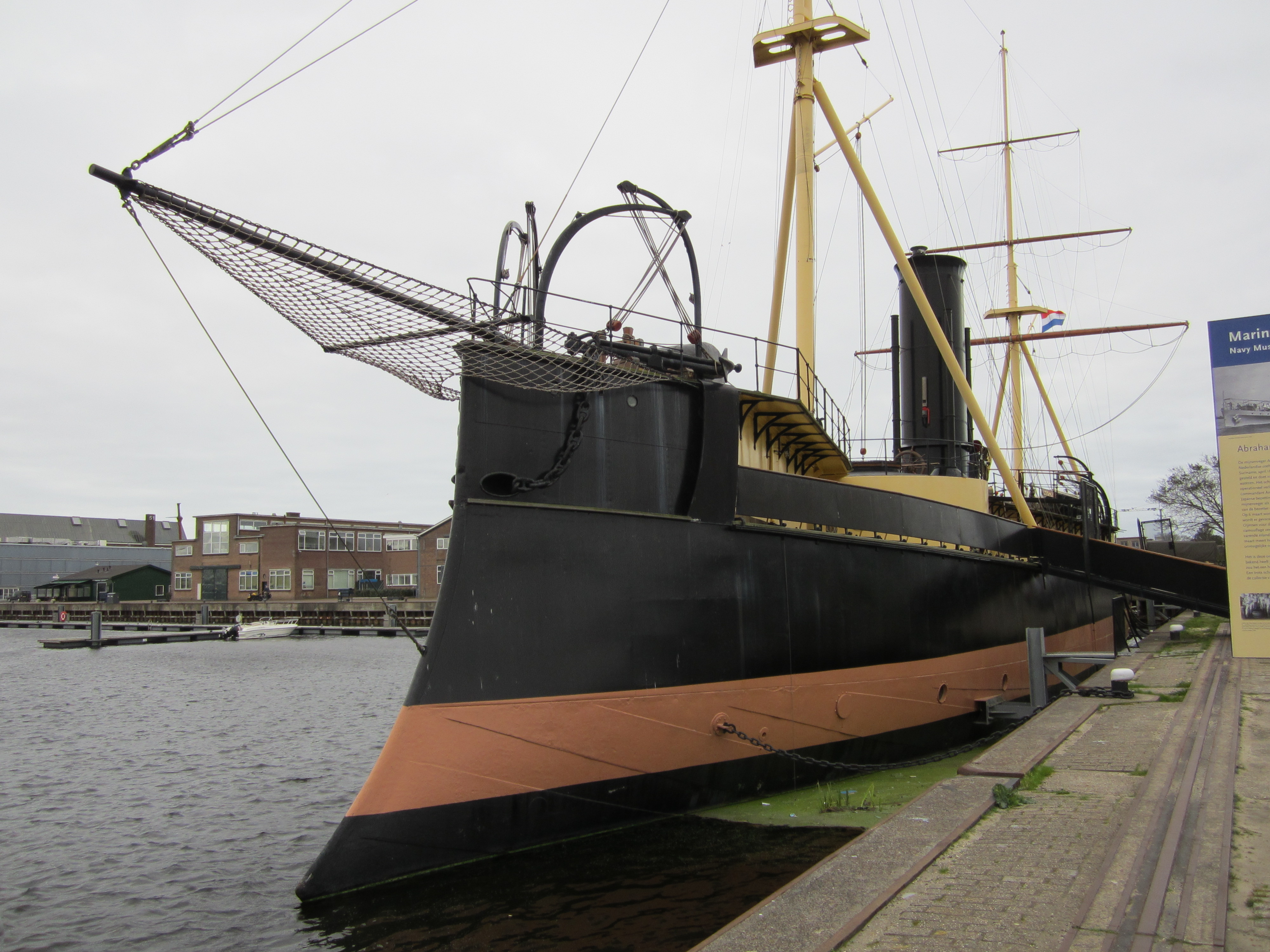
HNLMS Schorpioen in 2011

- Numancia (1865) — first ironclad to circumnavigate the Earth
- HNLMS Schorpioen (1868) An ironclad that is now a museum ship
- Asar-i Tevfik (1868) — an ironclad warship of the Ottoman Navy built in the 1860s, the only member of her class.
- Puigcerdá (1874)
- Brazilian monitor Solimões (1875)
- French cruiser Forfait (1879)
- Navarhos Miaoulis (1879)
- Spanish ironclad battleship Pelayo (1888)
- Capitán Prat (1889)
- Spetsai (1889)
- Chilean cruiser Presidente Errázuriz (1890)
- Chilean cruiser Presidente Pinto (1890) - shipwreck 1905
- Matsushima (1890)
- Itsukushima (1890)
- Zaragoza (1891)
- Haitian gunboat Alexandre-Pétion (1893)
- Svetlana (1896)
- D'Entrecasteaux (1896) — since 1927 Polish barracks ship ORP Bałtyk
- Bayan (1900)
- Russian pre-dreadnought Tsesarevich (1902)
- Admiral Makarov (1906)
- British hospital ship Salta (1911)
- French dreadnought Paris (1912)
- French passenger liner Patria (1913) — sunk in the Patria disaster in 1940
- French battleship Béarn (1914) — later converted to an aircraft carrier
- French passenger liner Providence (1915)
- French submarine Monge (1929)
- Montcalm (1935)
- Norwegian cruise ship Sagafjord (1965) — later the British Saga Rose
- Dutch / Dutch Antilles LPG-tanker Antilla Bay, #1396, (1973)
