= Russian destroyer Likhoy =

Imperial Russian and Soviet destroyer

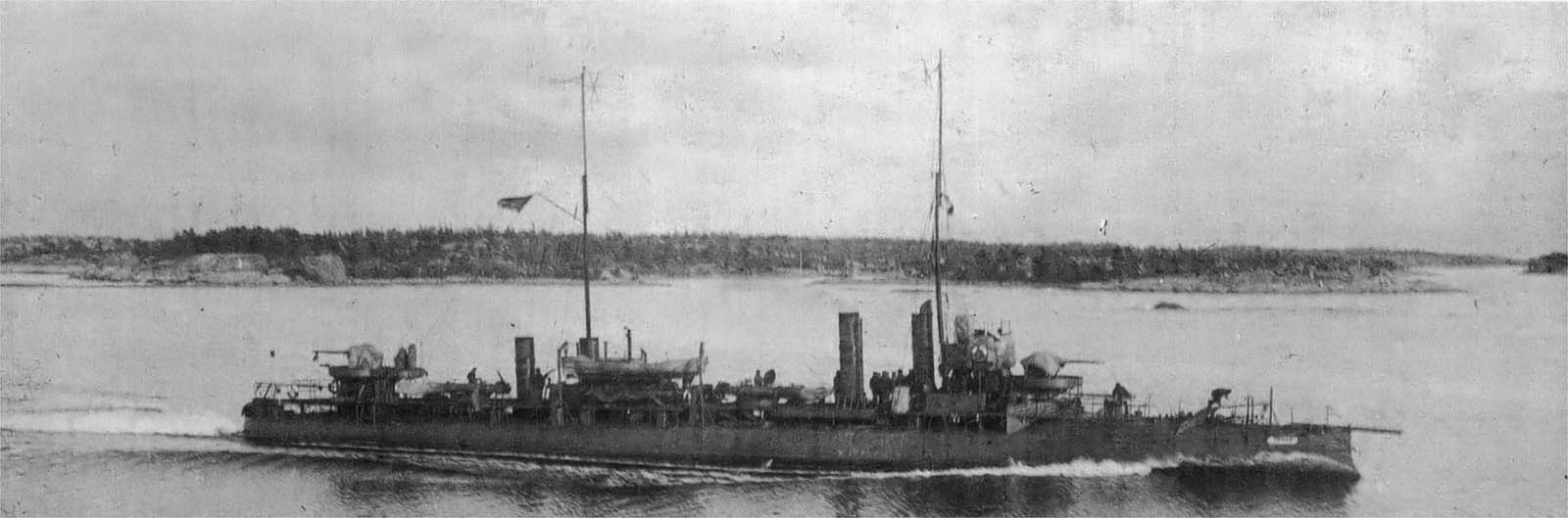

History

Russian Empire
- Name: Likhoy
- Builder: Normand, Le Havre, France
- Laid down: 1905
- Launched: 13 December 1905
- Completed: April 1906
- Fate: Scrapped, 21 November 1925

General characteristics
- Class & type: Leytenant Burakov-class destroyer
- Displacement: 402 t (396 long tons)
- Length: 56.49 m (185 ft 4 in)
- Beam: 6.4 m (21 ft)
- Draft: 3.21 m (10 ft 6 in) (deep load)
- Installed power: 4 Normand boilers; 6,000 ihp (4,474 kW)
- Propulsion: 2 shafts; 2 triple-expansion steam engines
- Speed: 26 knots (48 km/h; 30 mph)
- Range: 1,080 nmi (2,000 km; 1,240 mi) at 14 knots (26 km/h; 16 mph)
- Complement: 67
- Armament: 2 × single 75 mm (3 in) guns; 6 × single 7.62 mm (0.30 in) machine guns; 2 × single 450 mm (17.7 in) torpedo tubes

Likhoy (Russian: Лихой) was a Leytenant Burakov-class destroyer built for the Imperial Russian Navy in France during the first decade of the 20th century. Completed in 1906, she served in the Baltic Fleet and participated in the First World War.

== Design and description ==
The Leytenant Burakov-class ships displaced 402 metric tons (396 long tons)at normal load. They measured 56.49 meters (185 ft 4 in) long overall with a beam of 6.4 meters (21 ft 0 in), and a draft of 3.21 meters (10 ft 6 in). The ships were propelled by two 4-cylinder vertical triple-expansion steam engines, each driving one propeller shaft using steam from four Normand boilers. The turbines were designed to produce a total of 6,000 indicated horsepower (4,500 kW) for an intended maximum speed of 26 knots (48 km/h; 30 mph). During Likhoy's sea trials, she reached 27.45 knots (50.84 km/h; 31.59 mph). The ships normally carried 80 metric tons (79 long tons) of coal, but could carry a maximum of 100 t (98 long tons), this gave Likhoy a range of 1,080 nautical miles (2,000 km; 1,240 mi) at 14 knots (26 km/h; 16 mph). Their crew numbered 67 officers and men.

The main armament of the Leytanant Burakov class consisted of two 50-caliber 75-millimeter (3 in) guns, one gun each on the roofs of the forward and rear conning towers. They were also equipped with six 7.62-millimeter (0.30 in) machine guns. The ships were fitted with two single 450-millimeter (17.7 in) torpedo tubes. The forward mount was positioned between the funnels and the rear one was aft of the rear pair of funnels.

== Construction and career ==
Likhoy was laid down in 1905 by Chantiers et Ateliers Augustin Normand at their shipyard in Le Havre, France, and launched on 13 December 1905. She was completed in April 1906.

== Bibliography ==
- Apalkov, Yu. V. (1996). Боевые корабли русского флота: 8.1914-10.1917г [Combat Ships of the Russian Fleet: 8.1914-10.1917] (in Russian). Saint Petersburg, Russia: ИНТЕК. ISBN 5-7559-0018-3.
- Berezhnoy, S.S. (2002). Крейсера и Миносцы: Справочик [Cruisers and Destroyers: A Directory] (in Russian). Moscow: Ввоенное Ииздательство. ISBN 5-203-01780-8.
- Breyer, Siegfried (1992). Soviet Warship Development: Volume 1: 1917–1937. London: Conway Maritime Press. ISBN 0-85177-604-3.
- Budzbon, Przemysław (1985). "Russia". In Gray, Randal (ed.). Conway's All the World's Fighting Ships 1906–1921. Annapolis, Maryland: Naval Institute Press. pp. 291–325. ISBN 0-85177-245-5.
- Campbell, N. J. M. (1979). "Russia". In Chesneau, Roger & Kolesnik, Eugene M. (eds.). Conway's All the World's Fighting Ships 1860–1905. New York: Mayflower Books. pp. 170–217. ISBN 0-8317-0302-4.
- Halpern, Paul G. (1994). A Naval History of World War I. London: UCL Press. ISBN 1-85728-498-4.
- Harris, Mark (2025). The First World War in the Baltic Sea. Vol. 1: Essen's Triumph, 1914 to February 1915. Helion. ISBN 978-1-804519-10-3.
- Watts, Anthony J. (1990). The Imperial Russian Navy. London: Arms and Armour. ISBN 0-85368-912-1.
