= 75 mm 50 caliber Pattern 1892 =

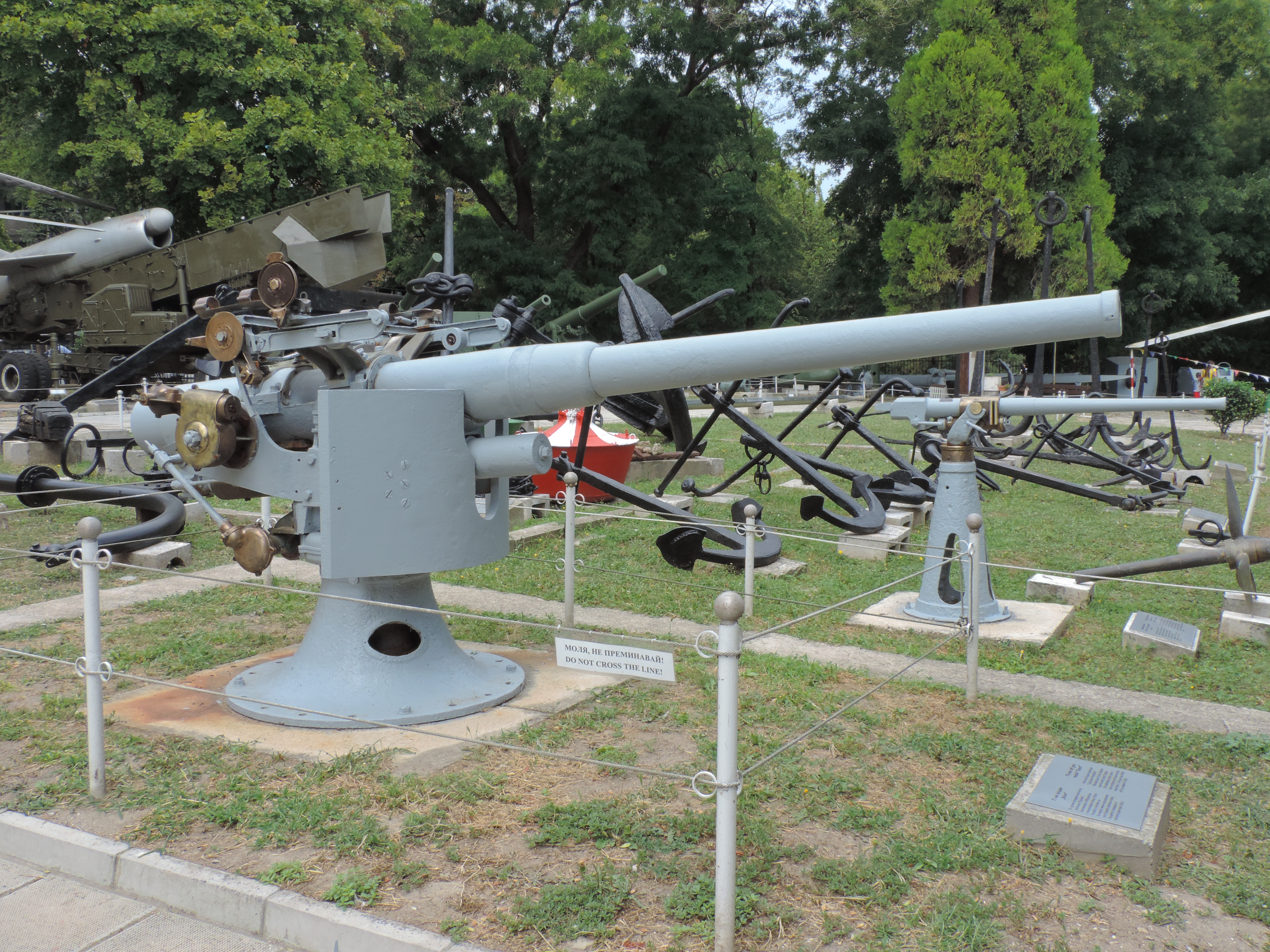
- 75 mm 50 caliber Pattern 1892 at the Naval Museum Varna Bulgaria.
- Type: Naval gun Coastal artillery Anti-aircraft gun
- Place of origin: France

Service history
- In service: 1892–1945
- Used by: Russian Empire; Soviet Union; Estonia; Finland; Poland; France
- Wars: Boxer Rebellion; Russo-Japanese War; World War I Russian Civil War; Winter War; World War II; Continuation War; Lapland War

Production history
- Designer: Canet
- Designed: 1891
- Manufacturer: Obukhov; Perm
- Produced: 1892

Specifications
- Mass: 901 kg (1,986 lb)
- Length: 3.7 m (12 ft 2 in)
- Barrel length: 2.9 m (9 ft 6 in)
- Shell: Fixed QF ammunition
- Shell weight: 4.9 kg (11 lb)
- Caliber: 75 mm (3.0 in) 50 caliber
- Elevation: Naval: -7° to +20° AA: -7° to +75°
- Traverse: 360°
- Rate of fire: 12–15 rpm
- Muzzle velocity: 862 m/s (2,830 ft/s)
- Maximum firing range: Naval: 7.8 km (4.8 mi) at +20° AA: 4.9 km (16,000 ft) at +60°

The 75 mm 50 caliber Pattern 1892 was a Russian naval gun developed in the years before the Russo-Japanese War that armed the majority of warships of the Imperial Russian Navy during the Russo-Japanese War and World War I. The majority of ships built or refit between 1890 and 1922 carried Pattern 1892 guns. During its career the role of the guns evolved from one of anti-torpedo boat defense to coastal artillery and anti-aircraft use.

== History ==
In 1891 a Russian naval delegation was shown three guns designed by the French designer Canet. One was a 75 mm/50 caliber gun, one a 120 mm/45 caliber gun and the last was a 152mm/45 caliber gun. All three guns used fixed QF ammunition which produced a rate of fire of 15 rpm for the 75 mm gun, 12 rpm for the 122 mm gun and 10 rpm for the 152 mm gun. The Russians were impressed and in 1892 they negotiated a production license for all three guns.

== Construction ==
75mm/50 caliber Pattern 1892 guns were produced at the Obukhov factory and the Perm factory between 1892 and 1922. By 1901 the Obukhov factory had produced 234 guns, with another 268 produced between 1909 and 1917. The Perm factory produced 70 guns between 1900 and 1907, with another 155 produced between 1914 and 1922. The original naval mounts produced between 1892 and 1913 had low angles of elevation −7° to +20°. Mounts produced between 1914 and 1928 were high angle Zenit-Meller mounts −7° to +75° suitable for use as coastal artillery and anti-aircraft guns.

== Coastal artillery and anti-aircraft use ==
It is estimated that 100 guns were left behind by the Russians in 1917 and used by the Finns. The majority of guns came from Russian coastal artillery installations with a smaller number being captured aboard warships the Russian Navy left behind. In 1924 the Finns still had 95 coastal artillery and anti-aircraft guns in their inventory. In 1941 it was estimated there were still 69 guns in active service with the Soviet Navy. In 1944 Finnish coastal artillery and Navy still had 66 guns, of which 10 guns were serving on ships.

== Naval use ==
75/50 guns armed a variety of ships such as armored cruisers, destroyers, dreadnought battleships, gunboats, light cruisers, minelayers, minesweepers, pre-dreadnought battleships, protected cruisers and submarines of the Imperial Russian Navy. After the 1917 October Revolution the successor states of Estonia, Finland, Poland and the Soviet Union all used this gun. The last Finnish warship to carry 75/50 guns was the minelayer Ruotsinsalmi, which was decommissioned in 1975.

=== Armored cruisers ===
- Bayan class – The four ships of this class had a tertiary armament of twenty, 75/50 guns in single mounts. Eight were in casemates amidships. While another twelve were on single, shielded mounts.
- General-Admiral class – The two ships of this class had a tertiary armament consisting of two or four, 75/50 guns, on single mounts, after refits in 1910 and 1925.

=== Destroyers ===
- Lieutenant Shestakov class – The four ships of this class had a secondary armament of five, 75/50 guns, in single mounts.

=== Dreadnought battleships ===
- Gangut class – Two ships of this class, the Sevastopol and Poltava had an AA armament of two, 75/50 guns, in single mounts, after 1916–1917 refits.
- Imperatritsa Mariya class – The three ships of this class had an AA armament of three to eight, 75/50 guns, in single mounts.

=== Gunboats ===
- Filin class – The four ships of this class had a primary armament of one or two, 75/50 guns, in single mounts, fore and aft.

=== Light cruisers ===
- Admiral Nakhimov class – One ship of this class the Chervona Ukraina had a secondary armament of four, 75/50 guns, in single mounts.
- Svetlana class – One ship of this class the Svetlana had a secondary armament of four, 75/50 guns, in single mounts.

=== Minelayers ===
- Amur class – The two ships of this class had a primary armament of five, 75/50 guns, in single mounts.
- Ruotsinsalmi class – The two ships of this class had a primary armament of one, 75/50 gun, in forward, in single mounts.

=== Minesweepers ===
- Rautu class – The two ships of this class had a primary armament of one, 75/50 gun, in forward, single mounts.

=== Pre-dreadnought battleships ===
- Borodino class – The five ships of this class had a tertiary armament of twenty, casemated, 75/50 guns, in single mounts.
- Evstafi class – The five ships of this class had a tertiary armament of fourteen, shielded, 75/50 guns, in single mounts.
- Imperator Aleksandr II class – One ship of this class the Imperator Nikolay I had a tertiary armament of six or eight, 75/50 guns, in single mounts, after a 1904 refit.
- Peresvet class – The three ships of this class had a tertiary armament of twenty, 75/50 guns, in single mounts. Of these guns, eight were mounted in casemates, four on the main deck, four on the battery deck and the last four at the corners of the superstructure on the forecastle deck.

=== Protected cruisers ===
- Bogatyr class – The four ships of this class had a secondary armament of twelve, 75/50 guns, in single mounts.
- Pallada class – The two ships of this class had a secondary armament of twenty four, 75/50 guns, in single mounts.
- Vitiaz class – One ship of this class the Rynda had a secondary armament of four, 75/50 guns, in single mounts, after a 1905 refit.

=== Submarines ===
- Bars class – This class of twenty four ships had a secondary armament of one, 75/50 gun, on forward mounts.
- Morzh class – One ship of this class the Tyulen had a secondary armament of one, 75/50 gun, on a forward mount.
- Narval class – This class of three ships had a secondary armament of one or two, 75/50 guns, on single mounts.

== Ammunition ==
Ammunition was of fixed QF type. A complete round weighed between 9.6–10.6 kg (21–23 lb).

The gun was able to fire:

- Armor Piercing
- High Explosive
- Illumination
- Incendiary
- Shrapnel

== Photo gallery ==
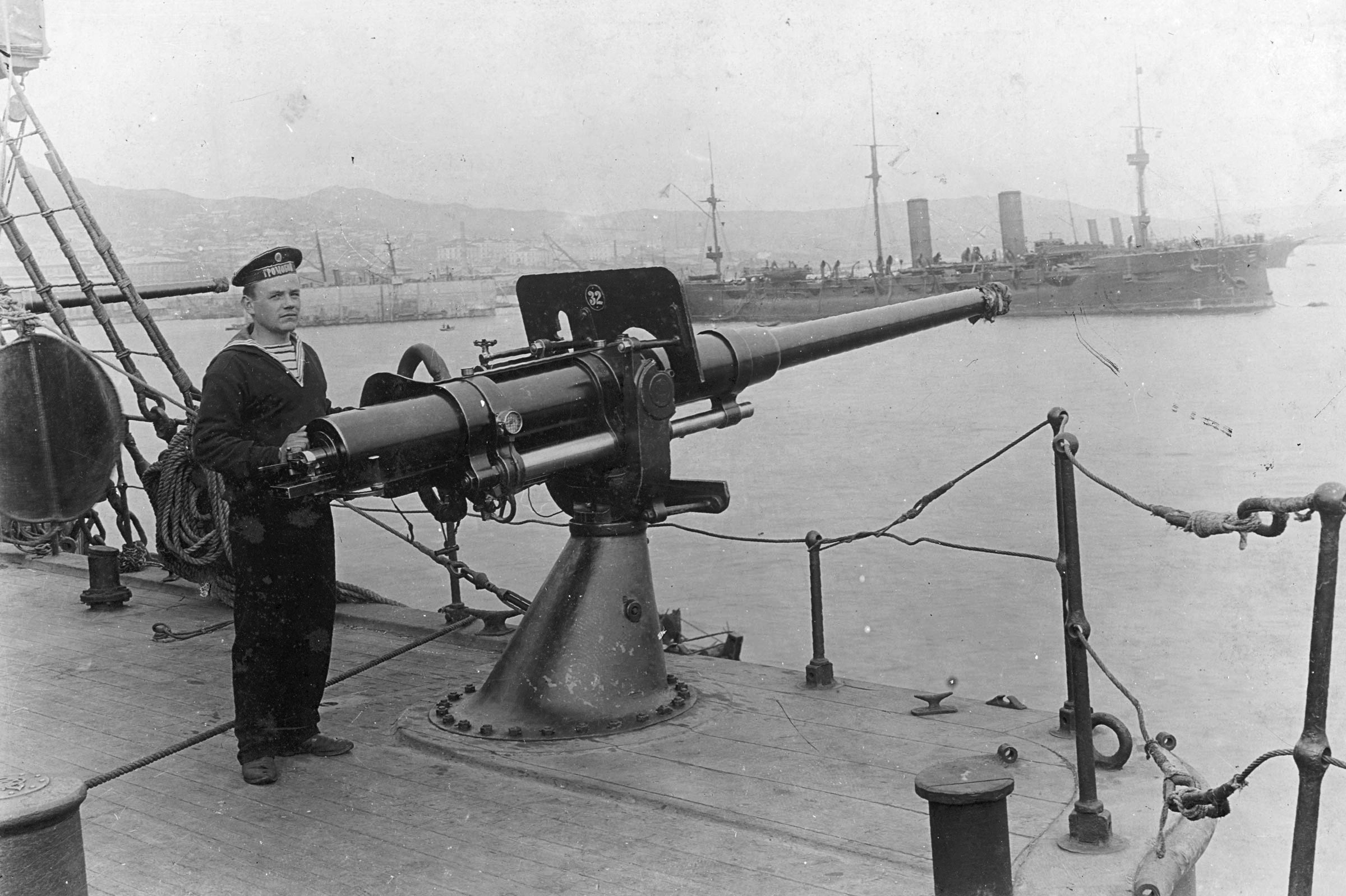
A Russian 75 mm/50 gun aboard cruiser Gromoboy.

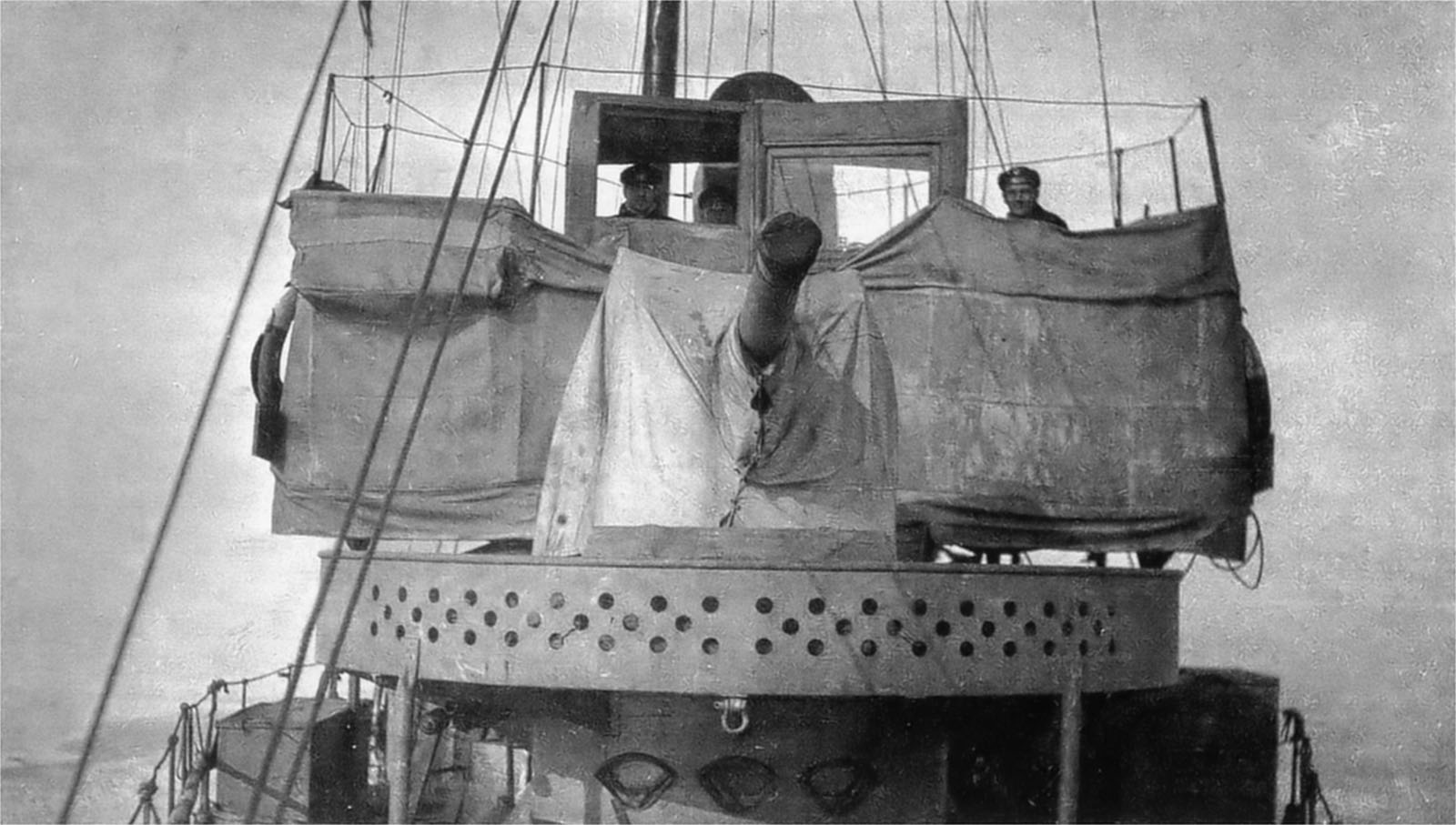
Russian destroyer Likhoy.

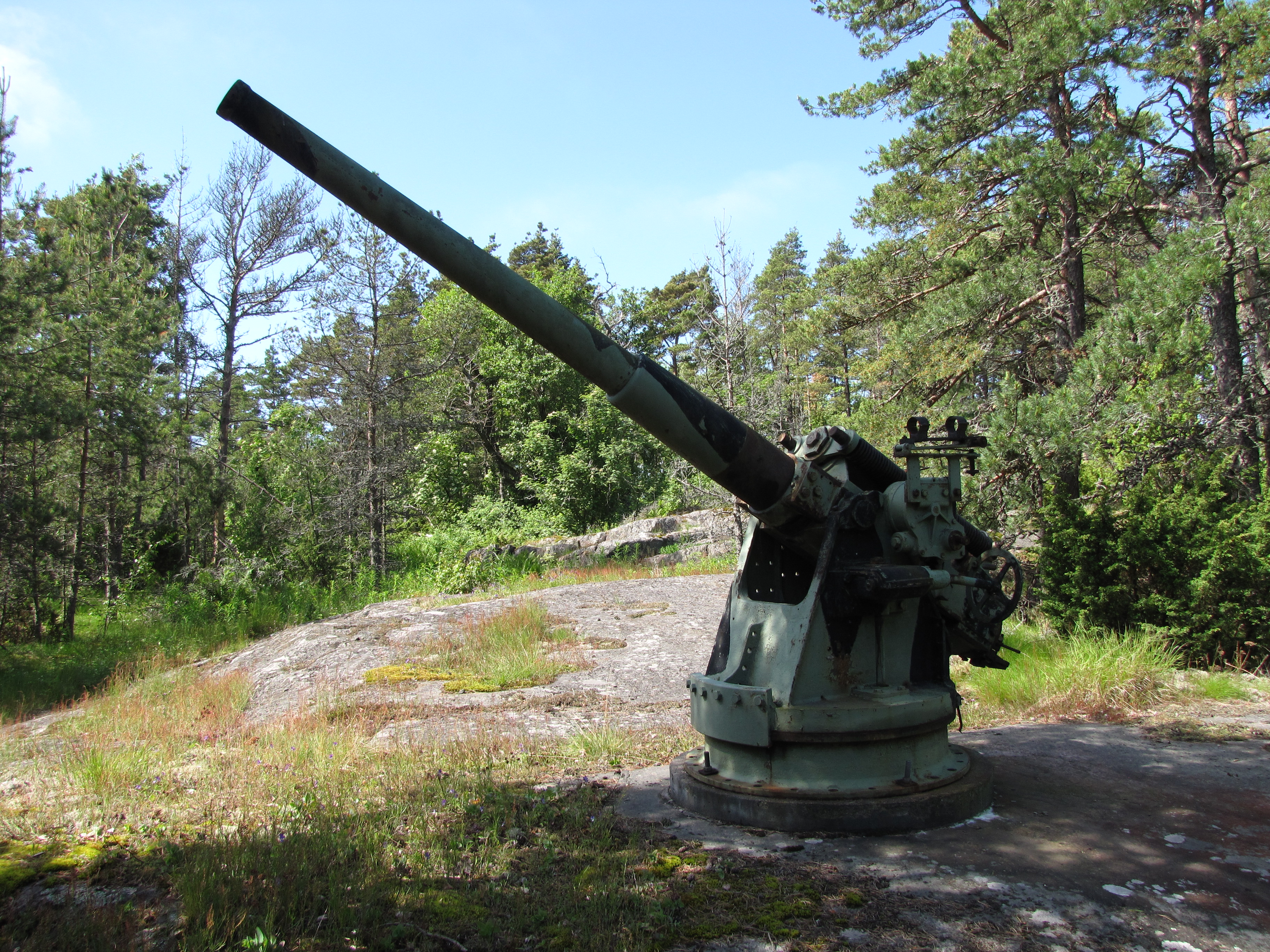
Imperial Russian Canet 75 mm/50 1892 naval gun in Kuivasaari. This gun has been rotated 180° so that the recoil springs are on top of the barrel to increase elevation.

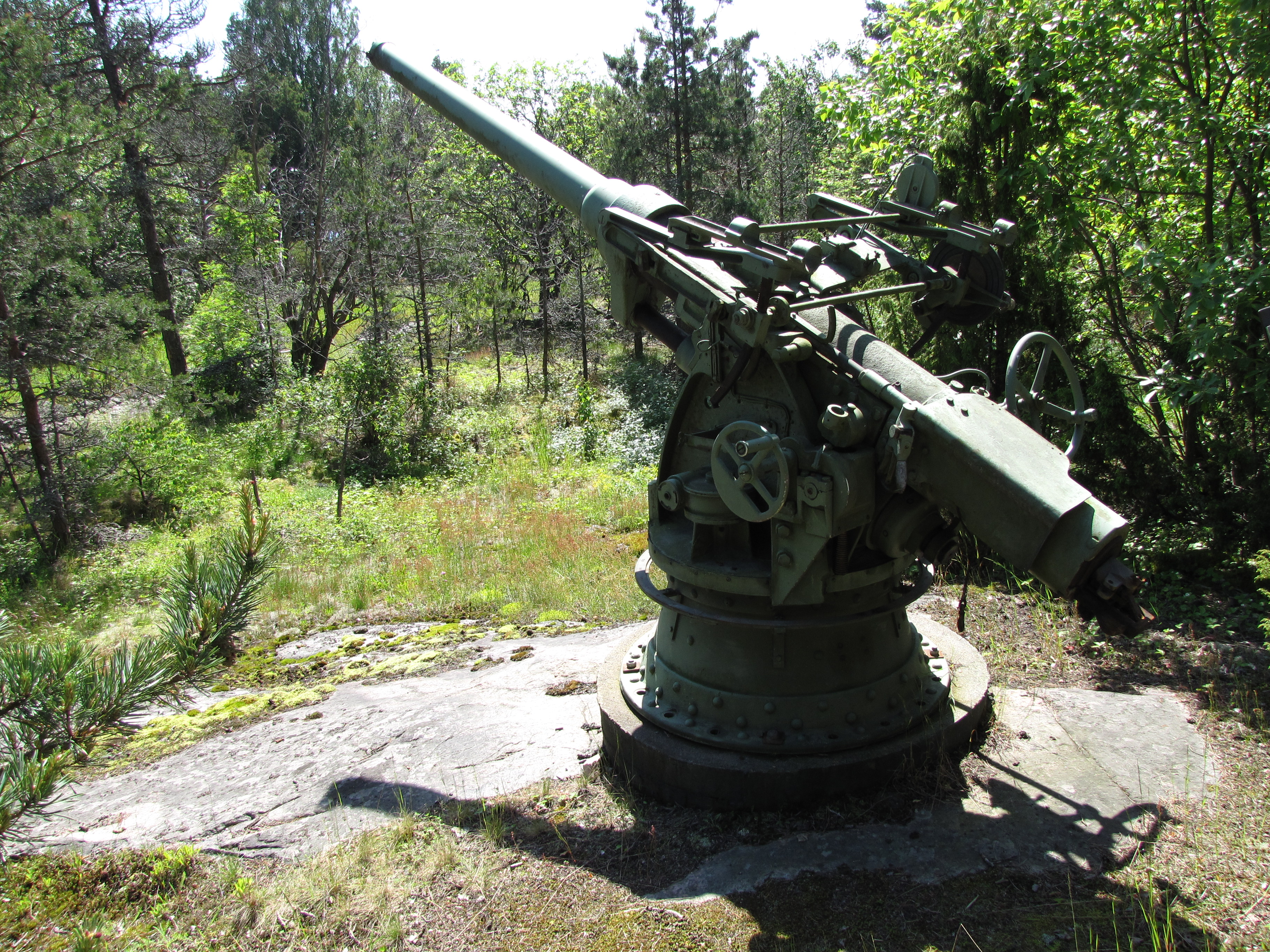
Imperial Russian Canet 75 mm/50 1892 naval gun on Obukhov carriage in Kuivasaari.

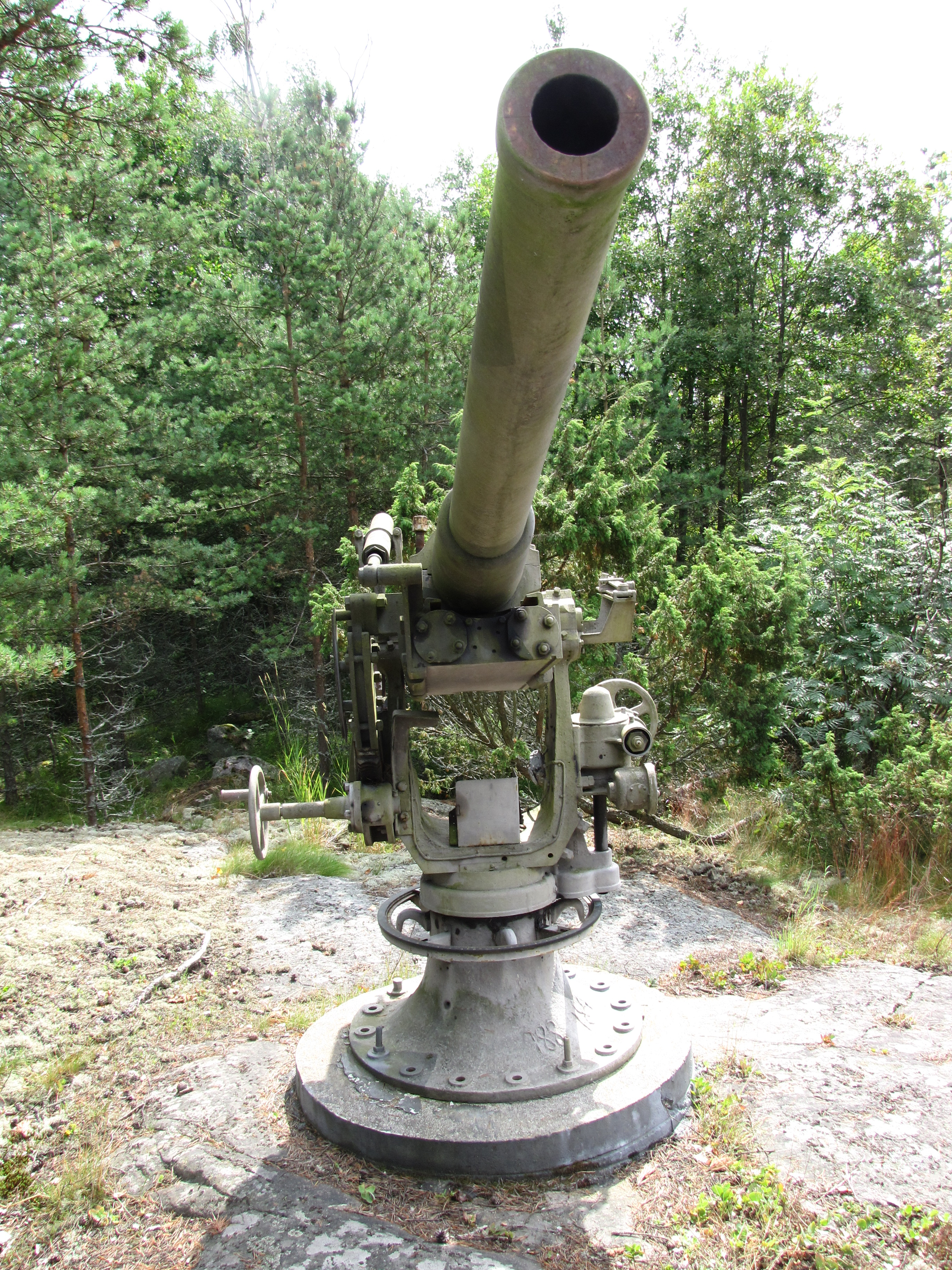
Imperial Russian 75 mm model 1892 Canet gun on 152 mm naval howitzer carriage in Kuivasaari. 75 mm Canet on howitzer carriage could be used as anti-aircraft gun, and eight guns were modified in Finland to fire 76 mm Bofors shells.
