= Eric Gascoigne Robinson =

English Royal Navy officer and recipient of the Victoria Cross

Rear-Admiral Eric Gascoigne Robinson VC OBE
- Eric Robinson, VC from Gallaher Cigarette Cards
- Born: 16 May 1882; Greenwich, Kent
- Died: 20 August 1965 (aged 83); Gosport, Hampshire
- Military career
- Allegiance: United Kingdom
- Branch: Royal Navy
- Service years: 1897–1933; 1939–1942
- Rank: Rear-Admiral
- Commands: HMS M21
- Conflicts: Boxer Rebellion; First World War: Gallipoli Campaign; Naval operations in the Dardanelles; Russian Civil War; Second World War: Battle of the Atlantic
- Awards: Victoria Cross; Officer of the Order of the British Empire; Mentioned in Despatches (2); Order of the Nile, Fourth Class (Egypt); Knight, Order of St Anna (Russia); Order of the Sacred Treasure (Japan); Knight, Legion of Honour (France); Croix de Guerre (France); King Haakon VII Freedom Cross (Norway)

Rear-Admiral Eric Gascoigne Robinson, VC, OBE (16 May 1882 – 20 August 1965) was a Royal Navy officer and a recipient of the Victoria Cross. He earned his award by going ashore and single-handedly destroying a Turkish naval gun battery while a lieutenant commander with the fleet stationed off the Dardanelles during the Gallipoli campaign in the First World War.

After these exploits, he was wounded on the front line on the Gallipoli Peninsula, but recovered and served continuously for the remainder of the war and into the Russian Civil War. In 1939 aged 57, he again volunteered for military service and spent three more years at sea, commanding convoys during the Battle of the Atlantic. In September 1941 he had to retire on health grounds, but in June 1942 he was well enough to be appointed to the post of Naval Officer in Charge, Dundee. which he held until his final retirement in November 1944.

== Early life ==
Eric Gascoigne Robinson was born in 1882 at Greenwich in Kent, to John Lovell Robinson and Louisa Aveline Gascoigne. John was the chaplain of the Royal Naval College at Greenwich and Eric's youth was spent in preparation for a life at sea. Robinson was educated at St John's School, Leatherhead before joining HMS Britannia aged fifteen in 1897 and rapidly progressed to the battleship HMS Majestic and then the first class protected cruiser HMS Endymion, in which he took part in suppressing the Boxer Rebellion in China. It was here, aged 18, that he saw his first action with the relief force, being wounded in action, mentioned in despatches and gaining a reputation as a daring and resourceful officer. He remained in China serving on a Yangtze gunboat for several years before returning to England and becoming a torpedo specialist at HMS Vernon, Portsmouth, in 1907.

In 1910, Robinson was promoted to Lieutenant Commander and spent his time between HMS Vernon, the depot ship HMS Thames and the cruisers HMS Blenheim and HMS Amethyst on active service. In 1913, he married Edith Gladys Cordeux, with whom he had three children. Robinson was slightly injured in a train accident shortly after his wedding, but soon recovered and was dispatched to the Mediterranean Sea at the outbreak of the First World War on board the old battleship HMS Vengeance.

== Gallipoli campaign and the Victoria Cross ==
The exploit in his Victoria Cross nomination was the result of Robinson's close friendship and working relationship with another aggressive officer, Roger Keyes, whom he had first met in China fifteen years before. Keyes was asked by his superior, Admiral John de Robeck, to prepare an assault on the Turkish gun battery at Orkanieh (also known as Achilles' Tomb), a position between Kum Kale and Yeni Shehr on the southern shore of the Dardanelles. This position had withstood fire from the battleships of the Allied fleet during the preceding weeks. Robinson was suggested as the leader of a commando force of sailors and Royal Marines tasked with destroying the battery and withdrawing in good order.

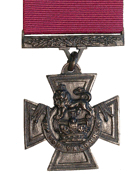
The Victoria Cross. Robinson's cross, as a naval recipient prior to 1918, would have had a blue ribbon as shown in the portrait above.

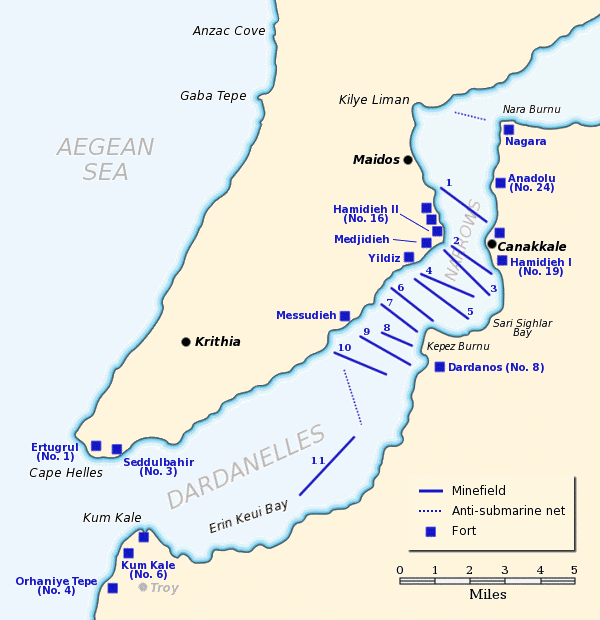
Turkish defences at the Dardanelles, March 1915. Kum Kale can clearly be seen on the Southern shoreline.

Robinson accepted the mission without hesitation. His force landed undetected early in the morning of 26 February, destroyed two small artillery pieces and made fast progress towards the main battery before being pinned down by Turkish snipers in the mid-afternoon. The white naval uniforms of the sailors proved an easy target for the Turks and casualties mounted as Turkish reinforcements were brought up to cut off the raiding party. Instead of withdrawing in the face of this threat, Robinson marched his men through gullies and came out close to a small rise behind the main battery. The open ground of the rise was covered by several Turkish snipers, but realising the importance of removing the artillery overlooking the sea passage, Robinson delegated command of the party to a junior officer and made the climb alone, dodging bullets in his white uniform until he crested the rise unhurt, emerging a few minutes later and starting back apparently unconcerned by the increasingly heavy gunfire directed at him. He was said to be "strolling around ... under heavy rifle fire ... like a sparrow enjoying a bath from a garden hose". The battery had been ungarrisoned, and Robinson was able to lay fuses which destroyed the large 9.4" main gun and two anti-aircraft emplacements within the position. Withdrawing in good order, Robinson evaded the Turkish reinforcements and then directed gunfire from the fleet onto their positions, including a force garrisoning an ancient tomb, inflicting heavy casualties. An immediate recommendation for the Victoria Cross was put forward by Admiral de Robeck who had observed proceedings from HMS Queen Elizabeth offshore.

During March 1915 the Allied fleet attempted to clear the minefields that were preventing the warships from sailing further into the Dardanelles. Trawlers, crewed by civilians, were used in this role but intense gunfire from Turkish shore based batteries meant that they were ineffective. Under pressure from the Admiralty, Admiral Carden put Roger Keyes in charge of minesweeping operations and Keyes again called on Eric Robinson to lead the trawlers, now including naval crews, into the minefields. On one of these sorties, Robinson's minesweeper was struck 84 times by small calibre shells. Despite the bravery shown during these operations the sweepers were unable to clear the lines of mines. The Allies made a final attempt to force the narrows on the 18th March but this resulted in the sinking of three battleships and serious damage to three more.

=== E15 mission ===
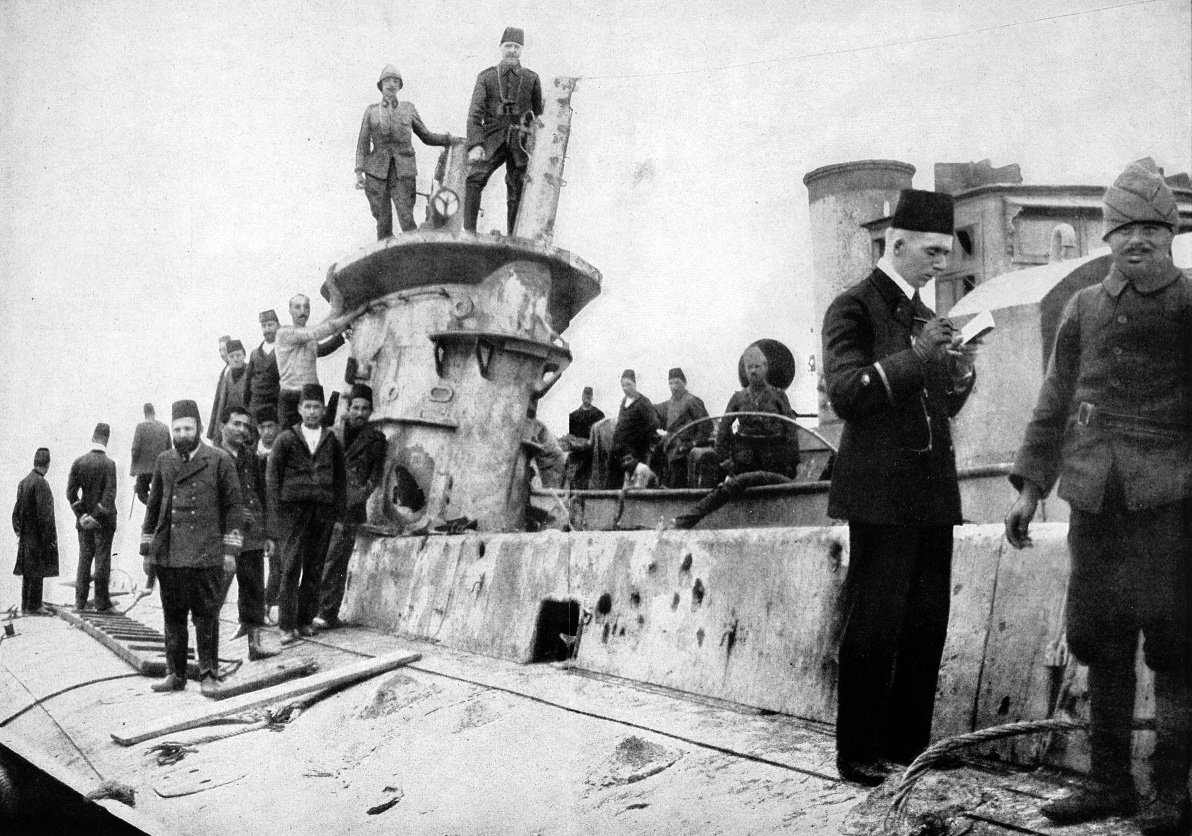
The wreck of HMS E15 photographed after Robinson's action

Robinson volunteered in April for an even more dangerous mission, following the Turkish capture of submarine HMS E15 which had stranded below the guns of Fort Dardanus near Kepez Point. All efforts to destroy this craft had so far failed and it was considered vital for naval morale that it was not salvaged by the enemy. Robinson took command of two picket boats from the battleships HMS Triumph and HMS Majestic, each armed with two torpedoes mounted on the gunwales in dropping gear, and entered the Dardanelles under cover of darkness on 18 April. Caught in a blaze of searchlights, and under heavy fire from the Turkish artillery and machine guns, both boats miraculously arrived unscathed. A carelessly-directed Turkish searchlight briefly illuminated E15. The boat from HMS Majestic under the command of Lt Goodwin seized the opportunity and attacked. The first torpedo missed, and seconds later the boat was struck by a shell that blew away much of her stern, mortally wounding one of her crew and causing her irreparable damage. Undeterred, Goodwin went in again and scored a direct hit with his second torpedo, just forward of the conning tower, wrecking the submarine.

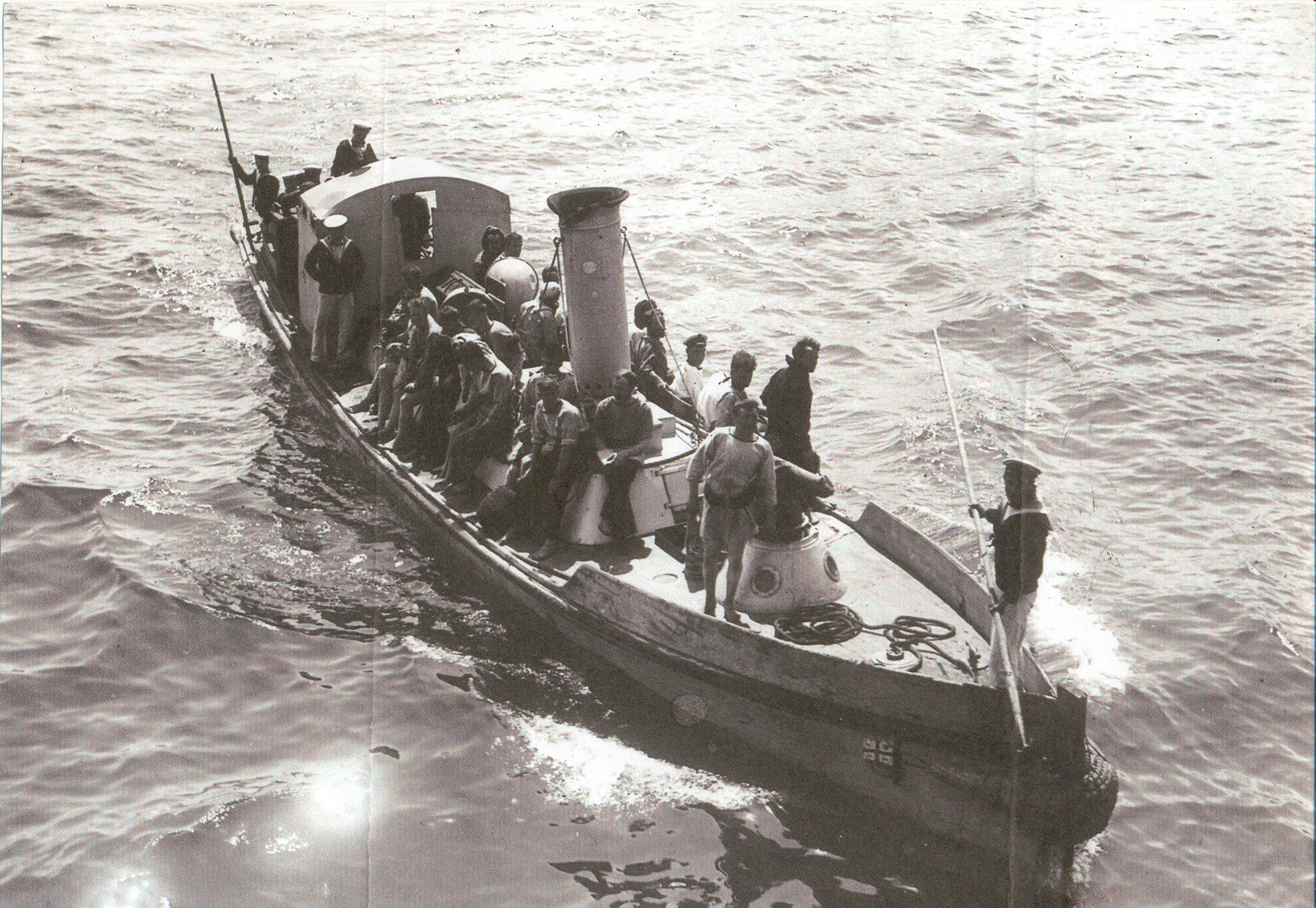
HMS Triumph's picket boat returning to the battleship after the E15 expedition.

Observing his consort's plight, Robinson did not hesitate, steaming to the stricken vessel and rescuing her crew before escaping downstream to Mudros. It was estimated that the Turks fired at least 500 heavy calibre rounds of ammunition at the two boats in just a few minutes. A German officer present noted that "I have never on the course of the war seen an attack carried out with such pluck and fearlessness". It has also been commented that this action should have brought Robinson a second Victoria Cross, but he was promoted to Commander by special decree instead.

=== Later war service ===
In August, Robinson was sent to Anzac Cove as a naval liaison officer and on his second day there, was badly wounded near the front line, forcing his evacuation to the UK, where King George V presented him with his medal at Buckingham Palace. Returned to the Mediterranean in December 1915 following his recuperation, he took over the coastal monitor HMS M21, in which he shelled Turkish positions throughout Egypt and Palestine and was awarded another mention in despatches and the Egyptian Order of the Nile, 4th Class. Returning to England in the summer of 1917, he narrowly missed selection for Keyes's operations against Zeebrugge and Ostend owing to his war wounds. In late 1918 he commanded the secret DCB Section of the Royal Signals School, Portsmouth which was developing unmanned remote controlled boats (a variant of Coastal Motor Boats) carrying an explosive payload to destroy enemy ships. The war ended before these could be used in action but in January 1919 Robinson was posted with 12 CMBs to the Caspian Sea under Commodore Norris as part of the Allied Intervention in the Russian Civil War. His first action was to force the surrender of vessels of the Centro-Caspian Flotilla, whose loyalty to the White movement was in doubt. He then converted two requisitioned merchant ships to carry CMBs in order to increase their range of operation. On the 21st May. Robinson was present at the Battle of Alexandrovsky Fort but owing to communication problems his CMBs were not brought into action. Two days later, Norris decided to reconnoitre the fort with two armed merchant ships but ran into two enemy destroyers. Fleeing the superior enemy, Norris radioed Robinson who was close by with one of the CMB carriers, to withdraw to safety. Robinson ignored this order and sailed towards the enemy. The Russian commander spotted the smoke of his ship on the horizon and, fearing that he was being led into a trap, turned and fled. The Bolshevik naval forces later withdrew from Fort Alexandrovsky and Robinson led a squadron of CMBs in an attack on the harbour which resulted in the surrender of the garrison. These achievements would later win him the Imperial Russian Order of St. Anne, 2nd Class.

== Peacetime and Second World War service ==
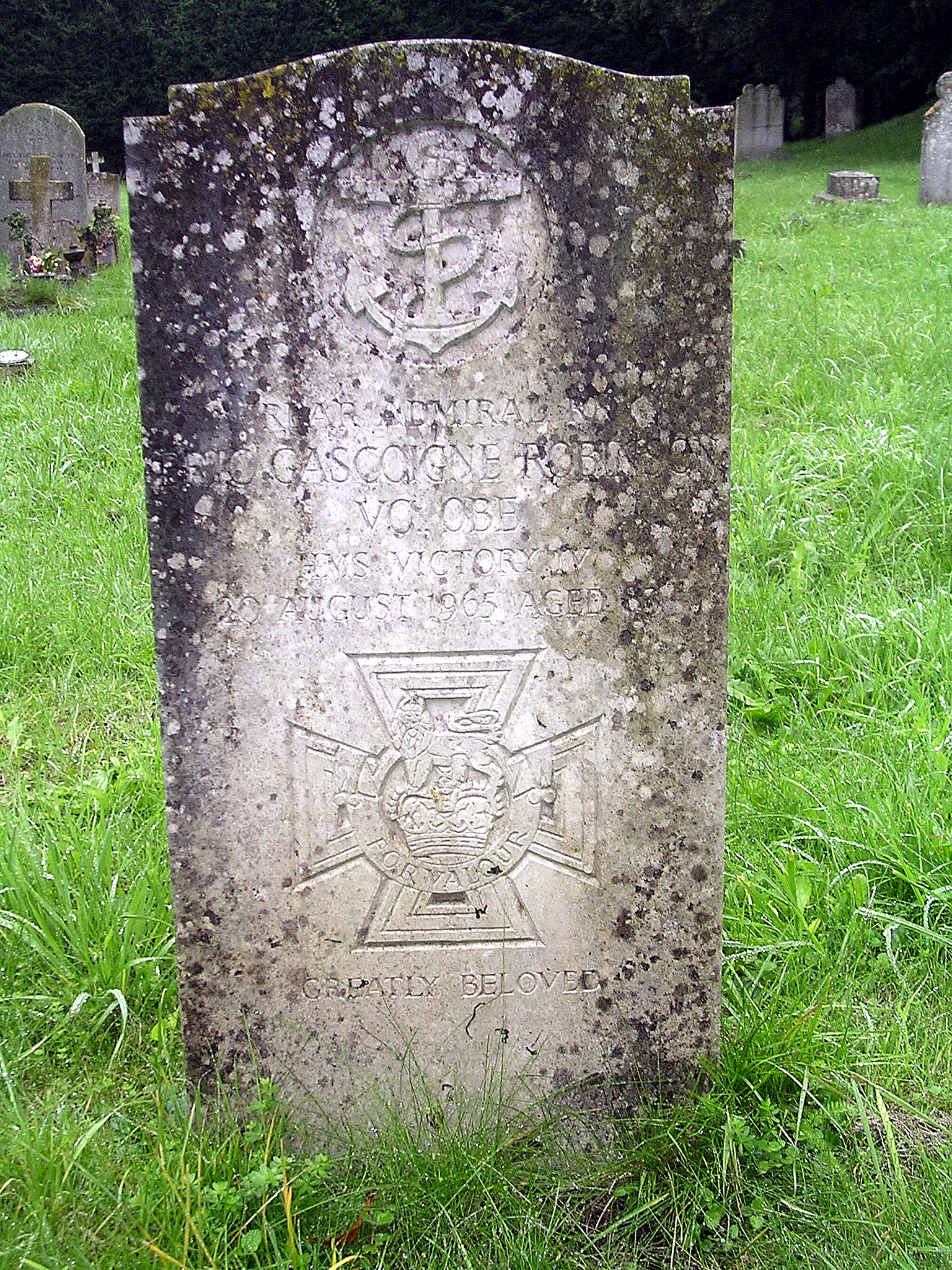
Robinson's headstone, bearing a representation of the VC

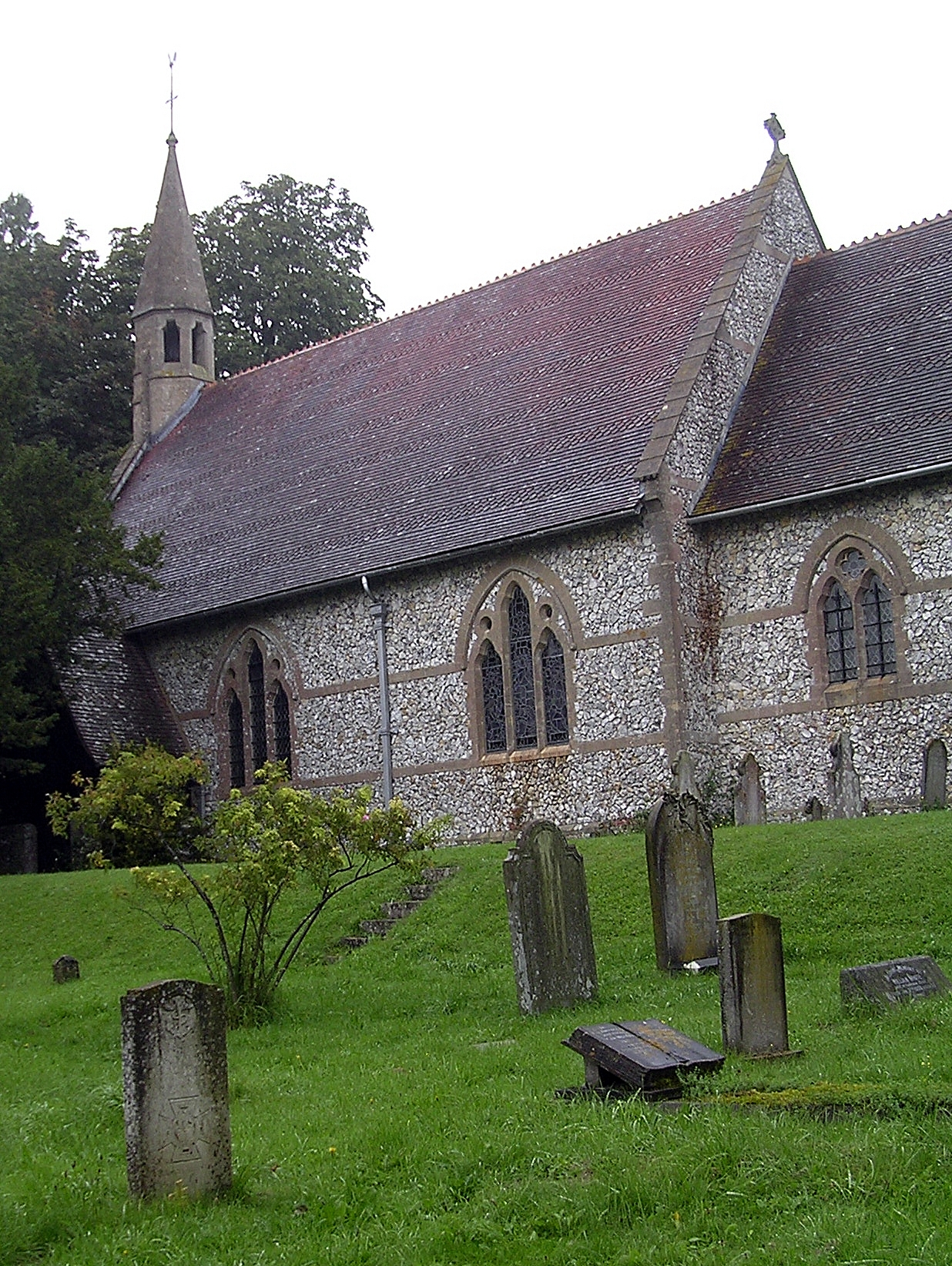
St John's, Langrish; Robinson's headstone in lower left corner

Following this period of extended service, Robinson was brought home, appointed Officer of the Order of the British Empire by the King for his Caspian Sea service, promoted again to captain and posted to HMS Iron Duke. Robinson then served in a number of training establishments and dockyards, as well as a brief stint with the Far East Fleet, during which he received the Japanese Order of the Sacred Treasure, Third Class for his services. In 1925, he was inducted into the Freemasons and remained a prominent member of the Navy Lodge for the rest of his life. The organisation still commemorates him in their publications. He retired at age 51 in 1933 as a rear-admiral, but when the Second World War broke out, Robinson immediately offered his services and for three years, commanded convoys across the Atlantic Ocean. A bout of ill-health led to his retirement in September 1941.

While awaiting a new posting he learned of the death of his son, Midshipman Edward Cordeaux Robinson, in the sinking of the cruiser HMS Neptune in December 1941, From June 1942 to November 1944 he served as Naval Officer in Charge at Dundee. For this service, he was later presented with the Norwegian King Haakon VII's Freedom Cross, the Légion d'honneur and the Croix de Guerre.

== Retirement and death ==
Robinson settled in the village of Langrish, near Petersfield in east Hampshire. He died peacefully at Haslar Naval Hospital, Gosport, on 20 August 1965 and was laid to rest at St John's, the village church he had served for 20 years as warden. For unknown reasons, his grave was without a headstone until 1998, although a large plaque to him was dedicated by his sister in 1969 and surmounts the altar. Following investigations by the Naval VC Association, his grave was discovered and a Commonwealth War Graves Commission headstone erected. At the dedication ceremony, attended by over 150 friends, relatives, Masons and servicemen, Admiral Derek Reffell gave the eulogy which stated: "The admiral was a hero, but more importantly he was a naval man from the finest mould. Now at last we can accord him the dignity he deserves."

== Citations ==
Admiralty, 21st April, 1915

Lieutenant-Commander Eric Gascoigne Robinson has been specially promoted to the rank of Commander in His Majesty's Fleet in recognition of the distinguished service rendered by him on the night of the 18th April, 1915, as Commanding Officer of the force which torpedoed and rendered useless Submarine E.15, thus preventing that vessel from falling into the enemy's hands in a serviceable condition, Dated 20th April, 1915.

— The London Gazette, 23 April 1915

Admiralty, 16th August, 1915

The following awards have been made in recognition of services during operations in the vicinity of the Dardanelles prior to 25th–26th April:-

The King has been graciously pleased to approve of the grant of the Victoria Cross to Lieutenant-Commander (now Commander) Eric Gascoigne Robinson, R.N., for the conspicuous act of bravery specified below.

Lieutenant-Commander Robinson on the 26th February advanced alone, under heavy fire, into an enemy's gun position, which might well have been occupied, and destroying a four-inch gun, returned to his party for another charge with which the second gun was destroyed. Lieutenant-Commander Robinson would not allow members of his demolition party to accompany him as their white uniforms rendered them very conspicuous. Lieutenant-Commander Robinson took part in four attacks on the minefields – always under heavy fire.

— The London Gazette, 13 August 1915

== Commemoration ==
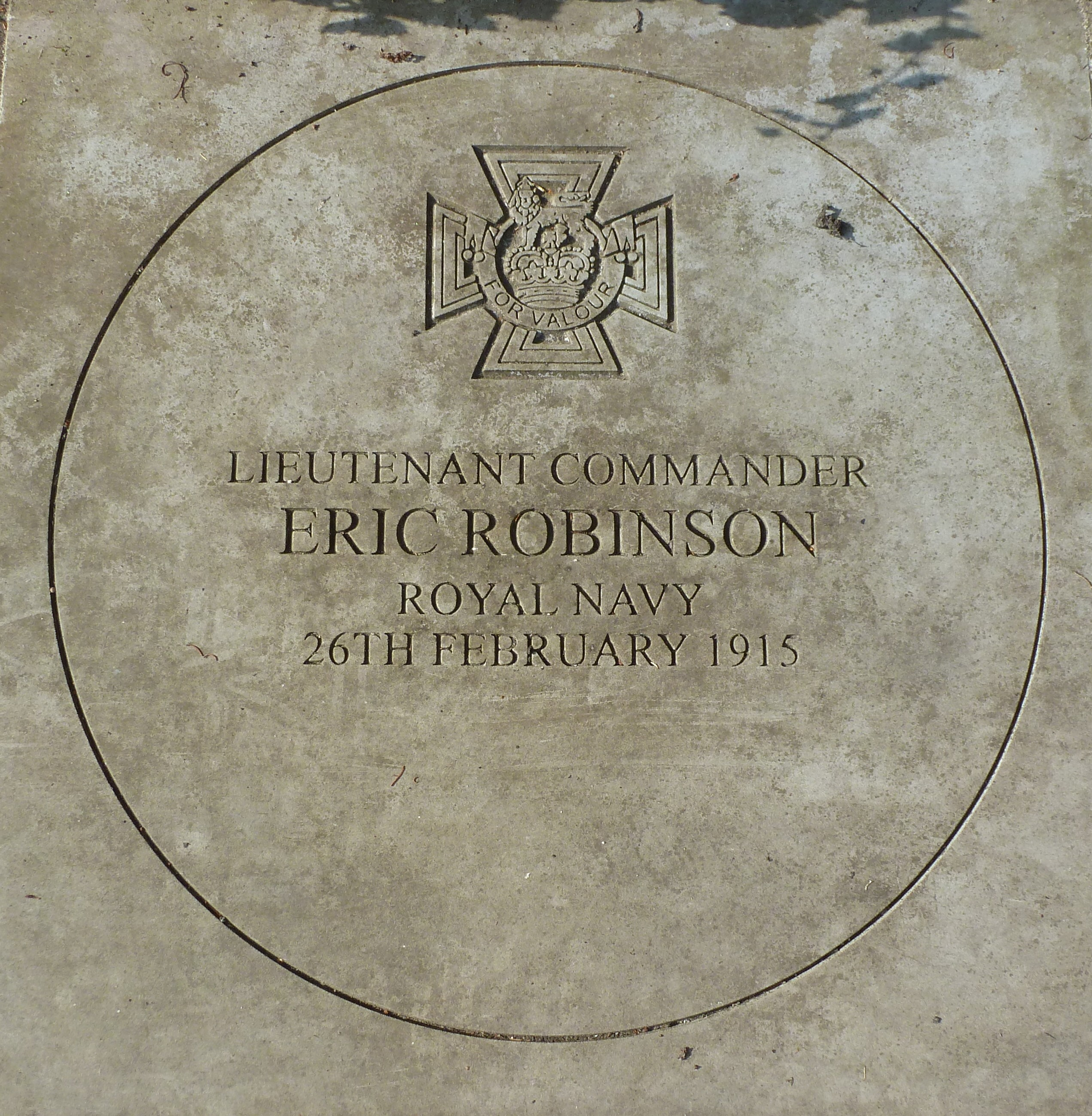
Eric Robinson VC, remembered at 1, Diamond Terrace, Greenwich

On 26 February 2015, one hundred years after his VC-winning deed, a commemorative paving stone was laid outside Robinson's former home at 1 Diamond Terrace, Greenwich. At the event Commander Operations, Rear Admiral Matthew Parr said he was in awe of Lt Cdr Robinson's "selfless actions" and added: "His courage, determination and fortitude in the face of overwhelming enemy action remain an example to us all; this commemorative stone will serve as a permanent memorial to a remarkable man."
