= Battle of Alexandrovsky Fort =

Battle of the Russian Civil War

Battle of Alexander Fort
- Part of the Southern Front of the Russian Civil War
Date	21 May 1919
Location	Bay of Tyub- Karaganskom in the Caspian Sea.
Result	British-White Russian victory

Belligerents
White Russia; United Kingdom	Russian SFSR

Commanders and leaders
(United Kingdom of Great Britain and Ireland) David Norris	(Russian Soviet Federative Socialist Republic) A.V.Burov †

Strength
5 auxiliary cruisers, 1 seaplane carrier	1 auxiliary cruiser, 1 destroyer, 1 minelayer, 1 floating battery, 2 submarines, minor units

Casualties and losses
2 auxiliary cruisers damaged. 5 killed, 7 wounded.	1 auxiliary cruiser damaged. 1 destroyer, 1 minelayer, 1 floating battery and auxiliary units lost.

The Battle of Alexander Fort (or Battle of Tyub-Karaganskom), was a naval battle fought in the Caspian Sea during the Russian Civil War at the naval military base of Fort Alexandrovsky.

== Background ==
As part of the allied intervention in the Russian Civil War, the Royal Navy established the British Caspian Flotilla. Most of the ship were merchants converted into auxiliary cruisers. The commander of the force was Commodore David Norris, who planned an attack against the key Soviet Russian naval base in the Caspian Sea. The attack resulted in the largest naval engagement of the front, with wide use of auxiliary cruisers.

== Battle ==
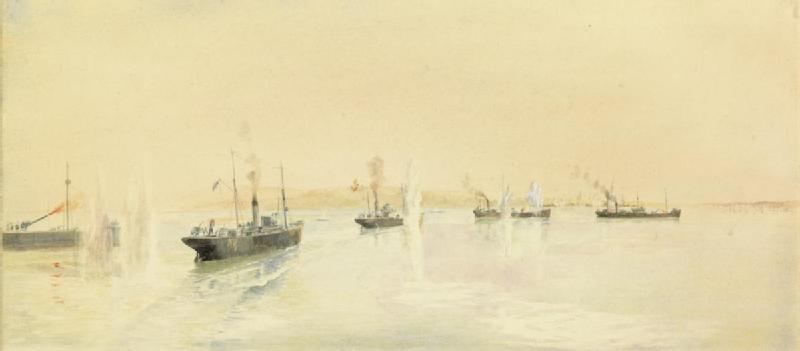
The Reconnaissance of the Bolshevik Advanced Base at Fort Alexandrovsk (Caspian Sea) - the destruction of the hostile fleet, May 21st 1919, by part of the British Caspian Squadron commanded by Commodore David Norris

Despite the presence of two small submarines and a destroyer on the Soviet side, superior numbers of auxiliary cruisers gave the British ships an advantage. On 20 May, some first accidents occurred: a seaplane from the tender Aladir Useynov crashed while on a reconnaissance mission, meanwhile two ships could not join the British task force (Slava and Bibi-Eybat: both suffering from engine troubles), additional engine troubles forced Sergie and the auxiliary cruiser Zoroaster to turn back.

Still, Norris's ships could enjoy superior numbers: on 21 May, the flotilla approached Alexandrovsky Fort and the Soviets lost the patrol boat Schastlivyy due to grounding while attempting to distract the British. Once the main battle erupted, the Soviets initially appeared victorious: a direct hit was scored on the bridge of Kruger (but with little damage), while two direct hits caused more harm to the Emile Nobel, which suffered 5 killed and 7 wounded. The first phase of the battle resulted in a temporary British retreat and Emile Nobel had to pull out of the fight. Other British sources state casualties were 5 killed and 3 wounded, in addition to 3 White Russians killed and 2 wounded: none of the ships suffered serious damage.

Shortly after, Commodore Norris engaged the Soviets once more, focusing the superior firepower of his ships: this time results were different when Kruger shelled and sunk the floating battery n°2 (responsible of the previous hits on the British ships with, a loss of 12 men). The destroyer Moskvitianin was quickly lost due to grounding after multiple failures on guns and engines. The depot-ship Revel was full of oil and a large explosion was triggered after she was hit, mortally damaging the minelayer Demosthenes (later scuttled). The explosion also engulfed the mine-carrier Tuman, the auxiliary ship Gelma, the smaller Zoroaster (not to be confused with the British ship) and a number of small barges. The small submarine Minoga was also damaged by fire. Meanwhile the Soviet flagship, the auxiliary cruiser Caspian, was damaged by two direct hits.

Commodore Norris halted fire, having caused serious losses to the enemy and after having spent most of the ammunition. During the battle, the Soviet submarine Makrel attempted to move into an attack position but failed. Soviet propaganda later claimed the British halted their fire due to Makrel's action, but the British ships never noticed the danger.

== Aftermath ==
The day after the main engagement, the Soviets evacuated the remains of their flotilla without British interference. The second seaplane from the tender Aladir Useynov scored a direct hit with a bomb on the grounded destroyer Moskvitianin, before crashing into the sea. The Soviet flagship Caspian, despite being damaged, was fit enough to lead the evacuation of the garrison: Kruger and Venture attempted to intercept the convoy but the sudden arrival of the destroyers Karl Liebknecht and Yakov Sverdlov resulted in a brief stand-off and the British ships retreated. Both destroyers opened fire but the distance was excessive: the area was soon covered by thick fog (due to the crash of the seaplane) augmented by smoke screen released by British cruisers as cover.

Commodore Norris had scored a significant victory over the Soviet Russian Navy, sinking enemy ships with little losses and forcing the Soviets to leave an important base. However, the White Admiral Kolchack criticized the lack of the complete destruction of the Caspian flotilla.

Two days later, on 23 May, British motor torpedo boats scuttled some of the wrecks left in the harbor by the Soviets.

== Order of battle ==
Royal Navy

British Caspian Flotilla

Auxiliary Cruisers

- HMS Kruger (flagship)
- HMS Zoroaster (not engaged)
- HMS Emile Nobel (damaged)
- HMS Asia
- HMS Venture
- HMS Windsor Castle

Tenders:

- Aladir Useynov
- Sergie (not engaged)

Soviet Russian Fleet

- Auxiliary Cruiser Caspian (flagship, damaged)
- Destroyer Moskvitianin (lost)
- Minelayer Demosthenes (lost)
- Floating battery n°2 (lost)

Submarines:

- Minoga (damaged)
- Makrel

6 patrol boats (one lost) 18 merchants/transport/support ships including depot-ship Revel (lost).
