= Gaidamak-class destroyer =

Early 20th-century Imperial Russian destroyer class

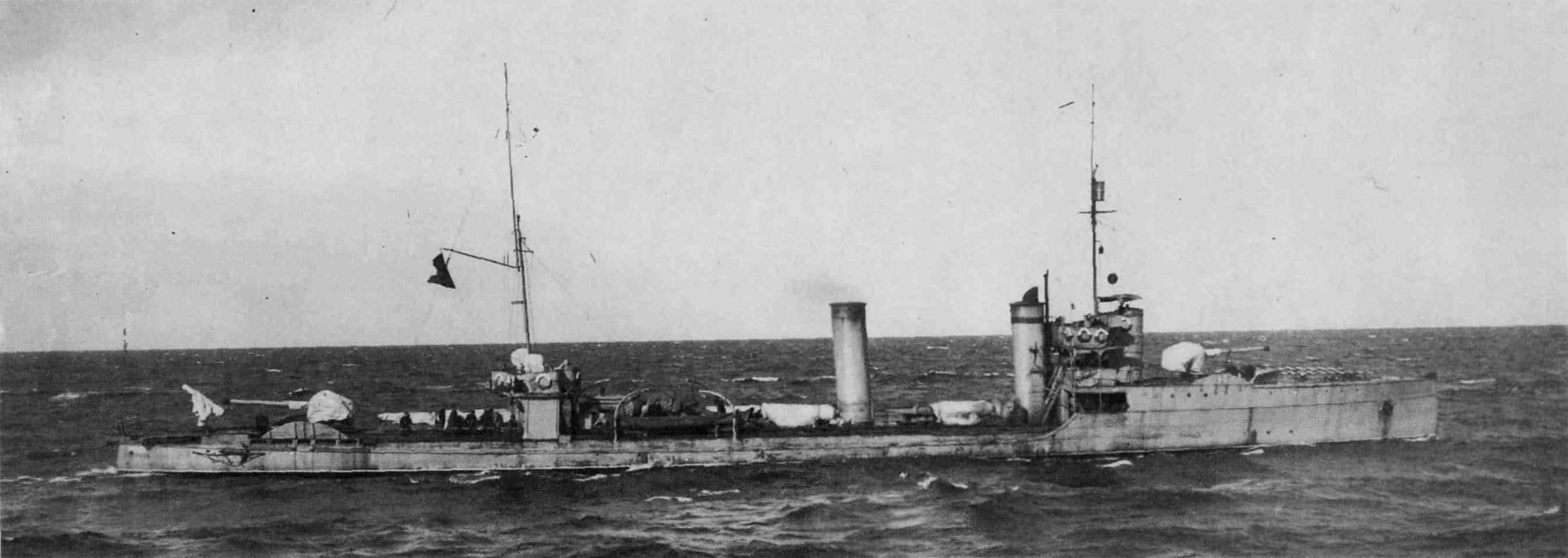
- Amurets

Class overview
- Builders: Germaniawerft, Kiel, German Empire
- Operators: Imperial Russian Navy; (Russian Soviet Federative Socialist Republic) Red Fleet
- Preceded by: Emir Bukharsky class
- Succeeded by: Okhotnik class
- Built: 1905–1907
- In commission: 1909–1947
- Completed: 4
- Scrapped: 4

General characteristics
- Type: Destroyer
- Displacement: 710–750 t (700–740 long tons) (deep load)
- Length: 70.99–71.9 m (232 ft 11 in – 235 ft 11 in)
- Beam: 7.41–7.59 m (24 ft 4 in – 24 ft 11 in)
- Draft: 2.44–2.67 m (8–9 ft)
- Installed power: 3 Schulz-Thornycroft boilers; 6,500 ihp (4,847 kW)
- Propulsion: 2 shafts; 2 triple-expansion steam engines
- Speed: 25 knots (46 km/h; 29 mph)
- Complement: 90
- Armament: 2 × single 75 mm (3 in) gun; 6 × single 57 mm (2.2 in) guns; 4 × single 7.62 mm (0.30 in) machine guns; 3 × single 450 mm (17.7 in) torpedo tubes

The Gaidamak class (Russian: Гайдамак) consisted of four destroyers built for the Imperial Russian Navy during the first decade of the 20th century. They served in the Baltic Fleet and participated in the First World War.

== Design and description ==
The Gaidamak-class ships normally displaced 570 metric tons (560 long tons) and 710–750 metric tons (700–740 long tons) at full load. They measured 70.99–71.9 meters (232 ft 11 in – 235 ft 11 in) long overall with a beam of 7.41–7.59 meters (24 ft 4 in – 24 ft 11 in), and a draft of 2.44–2.67 meters (8 ft 0 in – 8 ft 9 in). The ships were propelled by two vertical triple-expansion steam engines, each driving one propeller shaft using steam from three Schulz-Thornycroft boilers. The engines were designed to produce a total of 6,500 indicated horsepower (4,800 kW) for an intended maximum speed of 25 knots (46 km/h; 29 mph). During the ships' sea trials, they generally exceeded this figure, reaching 25.6–26.5 knots (47.4–49.1 km/h; 29.5–30.5 mph). Their crew numbered 90 officers and men.

The main armament of the Gaidamak class consisted of two 50-caliber 75-millimeter (3 in) guns, one gun each at the forecastle and stern. Their secondary armament included six 57-millimeter (2.2 in) guns, three on each broadside. The forward pair was positioned on a sponson at the main deck level below the forecastle, firing through an embrasure. The forecastle was narrowed to allow the guns to fire directly forward. This installation proved to be very wet, especially at high speeds, and made the guns very difficult to work. The other guns were abreast the rear funnel and the mainmast. All of the guns were fitted with gun shields. They were also fitted with four single 7.62 mm (0.30 in) machine guns. The ships were equipped with three 450-millimeter (17.7 in) torpedo tubes in single rotating mounts. The forward mount was located between the funnels while the middle mount was to the rear of the aft funnel and the rear mount was between the mainmast and the stern gun.

In 1910–1911 the ships were rearmed with a pair of 102-millimeter (4 in) Pattern 1911 Obukhov guns that replaced the 75 mm guns. All of the 57 mm guns were removed; the sponsons were removed and the embrasures were plated over. A 37-millimeter (1.5 in) anti-aircraft gun was added and the ships were modified to lay 25 mines.

== Ships ==
Construction data
Name	Laid down	Launched	Entered Service	Fate
Gaidamak (Гайдамак)	18 July 1905	1 November 1905	June 1906	Scrapped, 24 April 1927
Vsadnik (Всадник)	18 July 1905	24 August 1905	June 1906	Scrapped, 20 July 1929
Amurets (Амурец)	5 May 1905	late 1905	1907	Scrapped, 1950
Ussuriets (Уссуриец)	early 1904	1907		Scrapped, 29 April 1927

== Bibliography ==
- Apalkov, Yu. V. (1996). Боевые корабли русского флота: 8.1914-10.1917г [Combat Ships of the Russian Fleet: 8.1914-10.1917] (in Russian). Saint Petersburg, Russia: ИНТЕК. ISBN 5-7559-0018-3.
- Berezhnoy, S.S. (2002). Крейсера и Миносцы: Справочик [Cruisers and Destroyers: A Directory] (in Russian). Moscow: Ввоенное Ииздательство. ISBN 5-203-01780-8.
- Breyer, Siegfried (1992). Soviet Warship Development: Volume 1: 1917–1937. London: Conway Maritime Press. ISBN 0-85177-604-3.
- Budzbon, Przemysław (1985). "Russia". In Gray, Randal (ed.). Conway's All the World's Fighting Ships 1906–1921. Annapolis, Maryland: Naval Institute Press. pp. 291–325. ISBN 0-85177-245-5.
- Campbell, N. J. M. (1979). "Russia". In Chesneau, Roger & Kolesnik, Eugene M. (eds.). Conway's All the World's Fighting Ships 1860–1905. New York: Mayflower Books. pp. 170–217. ISBN 0-8317-0302-4.
- Halpern, Paul G. (1994). A Naval History of World War I. London: UCL Press. ISBN 1-85728-498-4.
- Harris, Mark (2025). The First World War in the Baltic Sea. Vol. 1: Essen's Triumph, 1914 to February 1915. Helion. ISBN 978-1-804519-10-3.
- Melnikov, R. M. (1999). Эскадренные миноносцы класса Доброволец [Volunteer-class Destroyers] (in Russian). St. Petersburg: Ed. Almanac Ships & Battles. OCLC 62741262.
- Watts, Anthony J. (1990). The Imperial Russian Navy. London: Arms and Armour. ISBN 0-85368-912-1.
