= Emir Bukharsky-class destroyer =

Early 20th-century Imperial Russian destroyer class

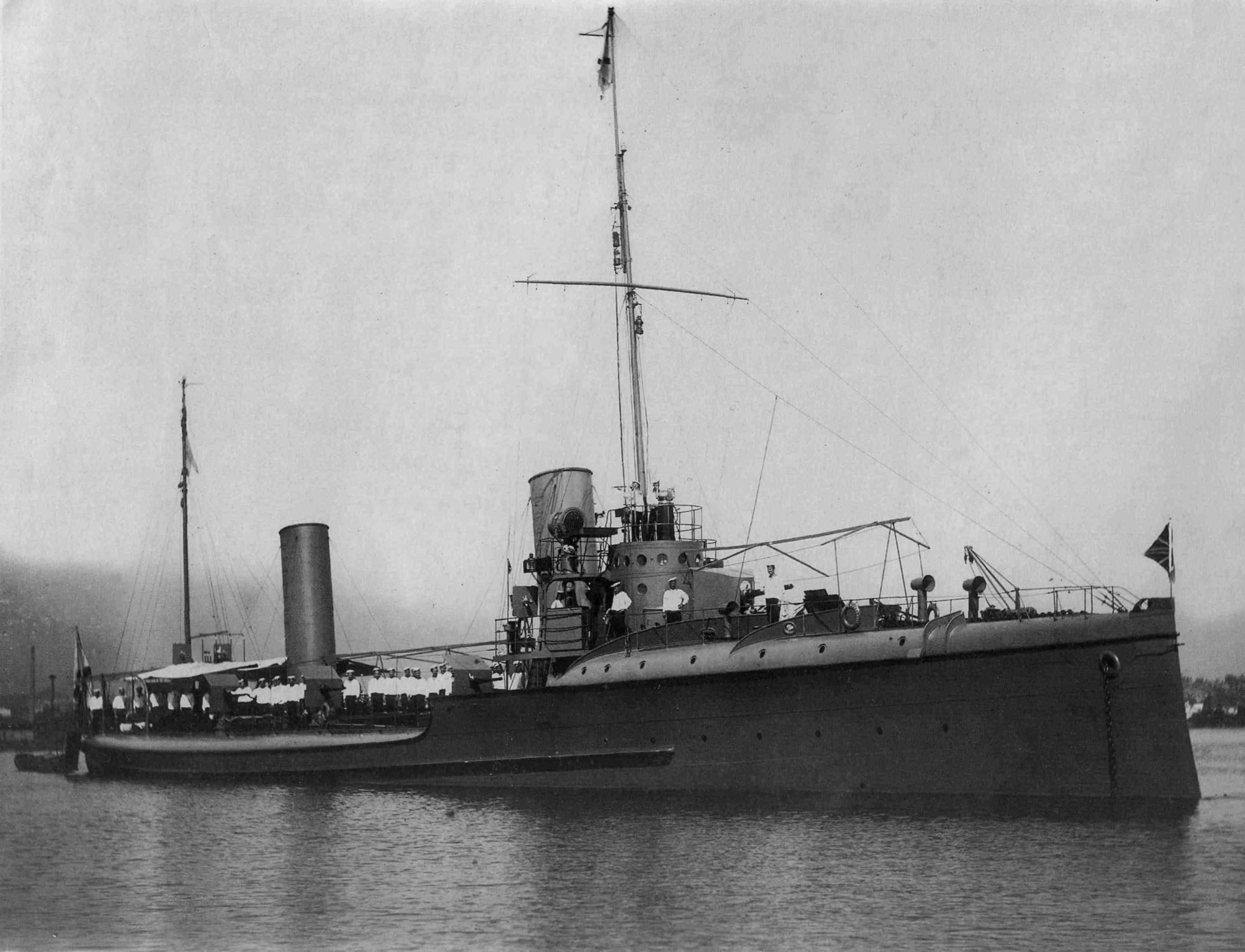
- Emir Bukharsky

Class overview
- Operators: Imperial Russian Navy; (Russian Soviet Federative Socialist Republic) Red Fleet
- Preceded by: Ukraina class
- Succeeded by: Gaidamak class
- Built: 1904–1906
- In commission: 1906–1925
- Completed: 4
- Scrapped: 4

General characteristics (as built)
- Type: Destroyer
- Displacement: 640–666 t (630–655 long tons) (deep load)
- Length: 72.39–72.54 m (237 ft 6 in – 238 ft 0 in)
- Beam: 8.18–8.23 m (26 ft 10 in – 27 ft 0 in)
- Draft: 2.71–3.02 m (8 ft 11 in – 9 ft 11 in)
- Installed power: 4 Schulz-Thornycroft boilers; 6,500 ihp (4,847 kW)
- Propulsion: 2 shafts; 2 triple-expansion steam engines
- Speed: 25 knots (46 km/h; 29 mph)
- Range: 1,020–1,150 nmi (1,890–2,130 km; 1,170–1,320 mi) at 12 knots (22 km/h; 14 mph)
- Complement: 91
- Armament: 2 × single 75 mm (3 in) gun; 6 × single 57 mm (2.2 in) guns; 4 × single 7.62 mm (0.30 in) machine guns; 3 × single 450 mm (17.7 in) torpedo tubes

The Emir Bukharsky class (Russian: Эмир Бухарский) consisted of four destroyers built for the Imperial Russian Navy during the first decade of the 20th century. They served in the Baltic Fleet and participated in the First World War.

== Design and description ==
The Emir Bukharsky-class ships were enlarged and improved versions of the preceding Bditelny class from 1900. The ships normally displaced 570 metric tons (560 long tons) and 640–666 metric tons (630–655 long tons) at full load. They measured 72.39–72.54 meters (237 ft 6 in – 238 ft 0 in) long overall with a beam of 8.18–8.23 meters (26 ft 10 in – 27 ft 0 in), and a draft of 2.71–3.02 meters (8 ft 11 in – 9 ft 11 in). The ships were propelled by two vertical triple-expansion steam engines, each driving one propeller shaft using steam from four Schulz-Thornycroft boilers. The engines were designed to produce a total of 6,500 indicated horsepower (4,800 kW) for an intended maximum speed of 25 knots (46 km/h; 29 mph). During the ships' sea trials, they generally exceeded this figure, reaching 26–26.95 knots (48.15–49.91 km/h; 29.92–31.01 mph). The Emir Bukharskys normally carried 140 metric tons (138 long tons) of coal, but could carry a maximum of 172 metric tons (169 long tons). This gave them a range of 1,020–1,150 nautical miles (1,890–2,130 km; 1,170–1,320 mi) at 12 knots (22 km/h; 14 mph). Their crew numbered 91 officers and men.

The main armament of the Emir Bukharsky class consisted of two 50-caliber 75-millimeter (3 in) guns, one gun each at the forecastle and stern. Their secondary armament included six 57-millimeter (2.2 in) guns positioned on the main deck amidships, three guns on each broadside. All of the guns were fitted with gun shields. They were also fitted with four 7.62-millimeter (0.30 in) machine guns. The ships were equipped with three 450-millimeter (17.7 in) torpedo tubes in rotating mounts. Two of the single-tube mounts were located between the funnels while the third was between the aft superstructure and the rear funnel.

Around 1910–1911 the ships were rearmed with a pair of 102-millimeter (4 in) Pattern 1911 Obukhov guns that replaced the 75 mm guns. All of the 57 mm guns were removed and replaced by a single 37-millimeter (1.5 in) anti-aircraft gun. The destroyers may have been modified to lay 20 mines at this time.

== Ships ==
Construction data
Name	Laid down	Launched	Entered service	Fate
Emir Bukharsky (Эмир Бухарский) Renamed Yakov Sverdlov, 12 April 1919	June 1904	30 December 1904	1906	Scrapped, 1 December 1925
Finn (Финн) Renamed Karl Libknekht, February 1919	June 1904	22 March 1905	1906	Scrapped, 1 December 1925
Moskvitianin (Москвитянин)	June 1904	7 May 1905	1906	Sunk, 21 May 1919; salvaged, 10 January 1920; scuttled, 28 March 1920
Dobrovolets (Доброволец)	June 1904	29 May 1905	1906	Sunk by mine, 21 August 1916

== Bibliography ==
- Apalkov, Yu. V. (1996). Боевые корабли русского флота: 8.1914-10.1917г [Combat ships of the Russian fleet: 8.1914-10.1917] (in Russian). ИНТЕК. ISBN 5-7559-0018-3.
- Berezhnoy, S.S. (2002). Крейсера и Миносцы: Справочик [Cruisers and Destroyers: A Directory] (in Russian). Ввоенное Ииздательство. ISBN 5-203-01780-8.
- Breyer, Siegfried (1992). Soviet Warship Development: Volume 1: 1917–1937. Conway Maritime Press. ISBN 0-85177-604-3.
- Budzbon, Przemysław (1985). "Russia". In Gray, Randal (ed.). Conway's All the World's Fighting Ships 1906–1921. Naval Institute Press. pp. 291–325. ISBN 0-85177-245-5.
- Campbell, N. J. M. (1979). "Russia". In Chesneau, Roger & Kolesnik, Eugene M. (eds.). Conway's All the World's Fighting Ships 1860–1905. Mayflower Books. pp. 170–217. ISBN 0-8317-0302-4.
- Halpern, Paul G. (1994). A Naval History of World War I. UCL Press. ISBN 1-85728-498-4.
- Harris, Mark (2025). The First World War in the Baltic Sea. Vol. 1: Essen's Triumph, 1914 to February 1915. Helion. ISBN 978-1-804519-10-3.
- Melnikov, R. M. (1999). Эскадренные миноносцы класса Доброволец [Volunteer-class Destroyers] (in Russian). Ed. Almanac Ships & Battles. OCLC 62741262.
- Watts, Anthony J. (1990). The Imperial Russian Navy. Arms and Armour. ISBN 0-85368-912-1.
