= Russian destroyer Ussuriets =

WWI-era Russian destroyer

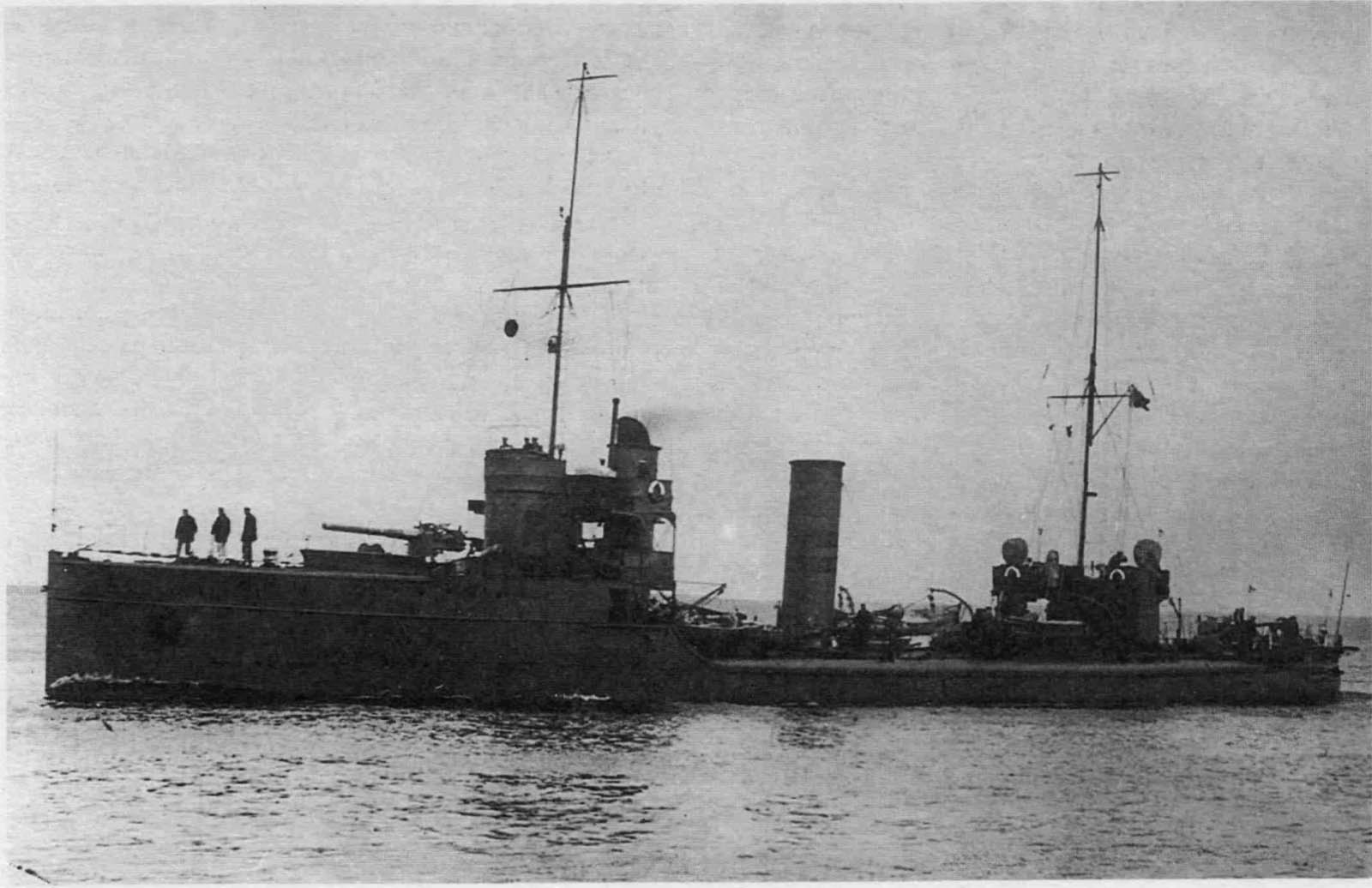

History

Russian Empire
- Name: Ussuriets
- Builder: Germaniawerft, Kiel, German Empire (built); Maskin & Brobgynads Shipyard, Helsinki, Grand Duchy of Finland
- Laid down: early 1904
- Launched: 1907
- Completed: 1907
- Stricken: 25 November 1926
- Fate: Scrapped, 29 April 1926

General characteristics (as built)
- Class & type: Gaidamak-class destroyer
- Displacement: 710 t (700 long tons) (deep load)
- Length: 71.9 m (235 ft 11 in)
- Beam: 7.41 m (24 ft 4 in)
- Draft: 2.67 m (8 ft 9 in)
- Installed power: 3 Schulz-Thornycroft boilers; 6,236 ihp (4,650 kW)
- Propulsion: 2 shafts; 2 triple-expansion steam engines
- Speed: 25 knots (46 km/h; 29 mph)
- Range: 1,920 nmi (3,560 km; 2,210 mi) at 15 knots (28 km/h; 17 mph)
- Complement: 90
- Armament: 2 × single 75 mm (3 in) gun; 6 × single 57 mm (2.2 in) guns; 4 × single 7.62 mm (0.30 in) machine guns; 3 × single 450 mm (17.7 in) torpedo tubes

Ussuriets (Russian: Уссуриец) was a Gaidamak-class destroyer built for the Imperial Russian Navy during the first decade of the 20th century. Completed in 1907, she served in the Baltic Fleet and participated in the First World War.

== Design and description ==
Ussuriets displaced 570 metric tons (560 long tons) at normal load and 710 metric tons (700 long tons) at full load. She measured 71.9 meters (235 ft 11 in) long overall with a beam of 7.41 meters (24 ft 4 in), and a draft of 2.67 meters (8 ft 9 in). The ship was propelled by two vertical triple-expansion steam engines, each driving one propeller shaft using steam from three Schulz-Thornycroft boilers. The turbines were designed to produce a total of 6,500 indicated horsepower (4,800 kW) for an intended maximum speed of 25 knots (46 km/h; 29 mph). During Ussuriets's sea trials, she reached 26.5 knots (49.1 km/h; 30.5 mph) from 6,236 ihp (4,650 kW). The ship had enough coal to give her a range 1,920 nmi (3,560 km; 2,210 mi) at 15 knots (28 km/h; 17 mph). Her crew numbered 90 officers and men.

The main armament of the Gaidamak class consisted of two 50-caliber 75-millimeter (3 in) guns, one gun each at the forecastle and stern. Their secondary armament included six 57-millimeter (2.2 in) guns, three on each broadside. The forward pair was positioned on a sponson at the main deck level below the forecastle, firing through an embrasure. The forecastle was narrowed to allow the guns to fire directly forward. This installation proved to be very wet, especially at high speeds, and made the guns very difficult to work. The other guns were abreast the rear funnel and the mainmast. All of the guns were fitted with gun shields. They were also fitted with four single 7.62 mm (0.30 in) machine guns. The ships were equipped with three 450-millimeter (17.7 in) torpedo tubes in single rotating mounts. The forward mount was located between the funnels while the middle mount was to the rear of the aft funnel and the rear mount was between the mainmast and the stern gun.

In 1910–1911 the ships were rearmed with a pair of 102-millimeter (4 in) Pattern 1911 Obukhov guns that replaced the 75 mm guns. All of the 57 mm guns were removed; the sponsons were removed and the embrasures were plated over. A 37-millimeter (1.5 in) anti-aircraft gun was added and the ships were modified to lay 25 mines.

== Construction and career ==
Ussuriets was built by Germaniawerft at their shipyard in Kiel, Germany, but was assembled by Maskin & Brobygnads Shipyard, Helsinki, in the Grand Duchy of Finland. The ship was laid down in early 1904 and launched in 1907. She was completed later that year and assigned to the Baltic Fleet.

== Bibliography ==
- Apalkov, Yu. V. (1996). Боевые корабли русского флота: 8.1914-10.1917г [Combat ships of the Russian fleet: 8.1914-10.1917] (in Russian). Saint Petersburg, Russia: ИНТЕК. ISBN 5-7559-0018-3.
- Berezhnoy, S.S. (2002). Крейсера и Миносцы: Справочик [Cruisers and Destroyers: A Directory] (in Russian). Moscow: Ввоенное Ииздательство. ISBN 5-203-01780-8.
- Breyer, Siegfried (1992). Soviet Warship Development: Volume 1: 1917–1937. London: Conway Maritime Press. ISBN 0-85177-604-3.
- Budzbon, Przemysław (1985). "Russia". In Gray, Randal (ed.). Conway's All the World's Fighting Ships 1906–1921. Annapolis, Maryland: Naval Institute Press. pp. 291–325. ISBN 0-85177-245-5.
- Campbell, N. J. M. (1979). "Russia". In Chesneau, Roger & Kolesnik, Eugene M. (eds.). Conway's All the World's Fighting Ships 1860–1905. New York: Mayflower Books. pp. 170–217. ISBN 0-8317-0302-4.
- Halpern, Paul G. (1994). A Naval History of World War I. London: UCL Press. ISBN 1-85728-498-4.
- Harris, Mark (2025). The First World War in the Baltic Sea. Vol. 1: Essen's Triumph, 1914 to February 1915. Helion. ISBN 978-1-804519-10-3.
- Melnikov, R. M. (1999). Эскадренные миноносцы класса Доброволец [Volunteer-class destroyers] (in Russian). St. Petersburg: Ed. Almanac Ships & Battles. OCLC 62741262.
- Watts, Anthony J. (1990). The Imperial Russian Navy. London: Arms and Armour. ISBN 0-85368-912-1.
