= David Norris (Royal Navy officer) =

Royal Navy Admiral (1875–1937)

Admiral David Norris CB CMG
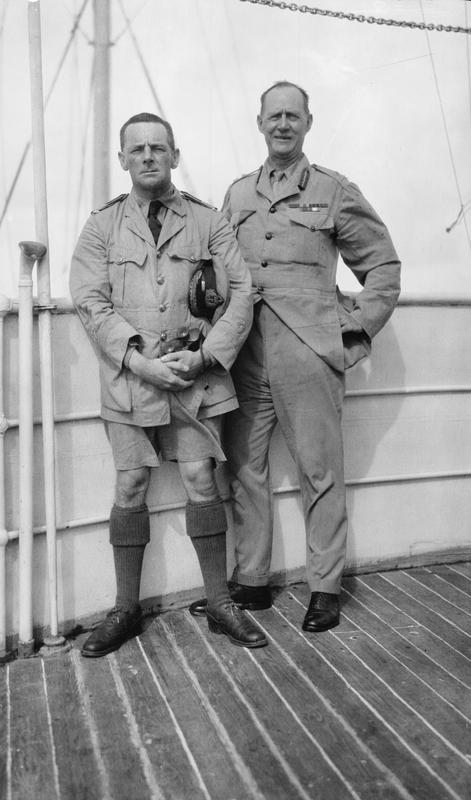
- Commodore Norris RN (left) on the Caspian with Major-General Lionel Dunsterville (right), General Officer Commanding Dunsterforce
- Born: 27 October 1875
- Died: 19 July 1937 (aged 61)
- Military career
- Allegiance: United Kingdom
- Branch: Royal Navy
- Service years: 1888–1929
- Rank: Admiral
- Commands: HMS Arlanza; HMS Valiant; British Caspian Flotilla
- Conflicts: World War I Battle of Alexandrovsky Fort
- Awards: Companion of the Order of the Bath; Companion of the Order of St Michael and St George

Admiral David Thomas Norris CB CMG (27 October 1875 – 19 July 1937) was a British Royal Navy officer.

== Early life and career ==
Norris was the son of Mr Justice Norris, a judge of the Calcutta High Court. He was educated at Clifton College, and joined HMS Britannia as a Naval Cadet at the age of 13, being promoted midshipman two years later.

Promoted Lieutenant in November 1896, he specialised in gunnery, and served as gunnery officer in the battleship HMS Vengeance on the China Station. He was promoted commander in December 1907 and in 1908 became flag commander to the Commander-in-Chief China Station. He then served as executive officer of HMS Dominion, followed by HMS Superb, both in the Home Fleet.

== First World War and Russian Civil War ==
Norris was promoted captain shortly before the outbreak of the First World War in 1914 and took command of the armed merchant cruiser HMS Arlanza with the 10th Cruiser Squadron. After two years he was posted to the Air Department of the Admiralty in London, where he was in charge of naval airships, and in 1918 he was appointed Commodore 2nd Class and Senior Naval Officer of the Persian Gulf division of the East Indies Station, assuming command on 29 March 1918.

In September 1918, he reached Enzeli on the Caspian Sea with a small party of officers and men to establish the British Caspian Flotilla. He set about collecting and arming merchant vessels for use in the Russian Civil War. By the end of October he had four vessels, to which were added some coastal motorboats and an air unit. On 21 May 1919, with six armed merchant vessels, he attacked thirty Bolshevik vessels and destroyed fourteen of them. For his services in the Caspian he was mentioned in dispatches twice, appointed Companion of the Order of the Bath (CB) in March 1919 and Companion of the Order of St Michael and St George (CMG) in the 1920 New Year Honours.

== Post-war ==
From 1920 to 1921 he was head of the British Naval Mission to Persia, and in 1922 he became director of the Trade Division of the Naval Staff. In 1924 he took command of the battleship HMS Valiant in the Home Fleet, but in October 1924 he was promoted rear-admiral in the 1st Battle Squadron of the Mediterranean Fleet, a position he held until September 1927. He retired on promotion to vice-admiral in October 1929 and was promoted admiral on the retired list in October 1933.
