= Russian destroyer Finn =

Imperial Russian and Soviet destroyer

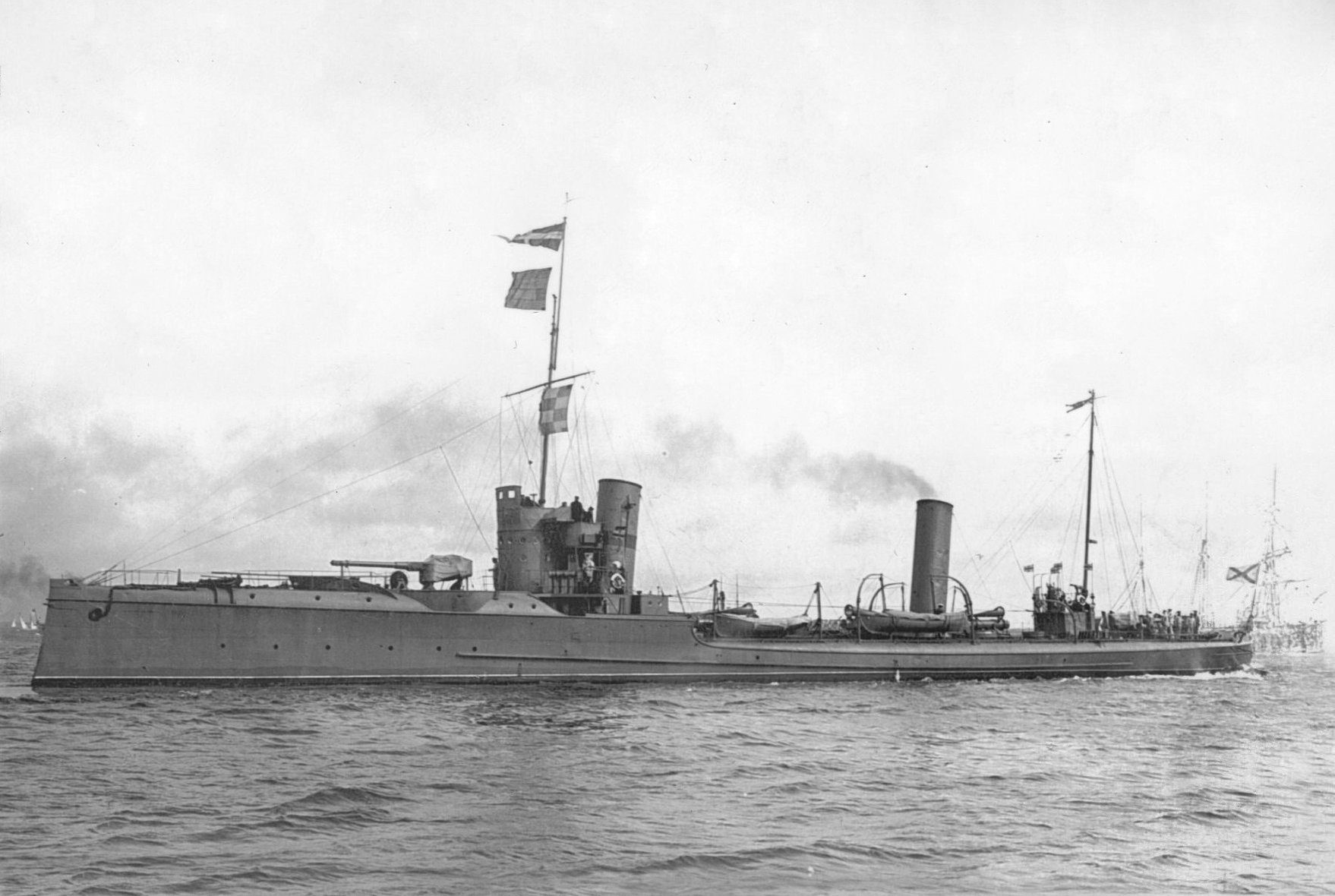

History

Russian Empire
- Name: Finn
- Builder: Sandvikens Skeppsdocka och Mekaniska Verkstad, Helsinki, Grand Duchy of Finland
- Laid down: June 1904
- Launched: 22 March 1905
- Completed: 1906
- Fate: Scrapped, 1 December 1925

General characteristics
- Class & type: Emir Bukharsky-class destroyer
- Displacement: 666 t (655 long tons) (deep load)
- Length: 72.51 m (237 ft 11 in)
- Beam: 8.2 m (26 ft 11 in)
- Draft: 3.02 m (9 ft 11 in)
- Installed power: 4 Schulz-Thornycroft boilers; 6,500 ihp (4,847 kW)
- Propulsion: 2 shafts; 2 triple-expansion steam engines
- Speed: 25 knots (46 km/h; 29 mph)
- Range: 1,150 nmi (2,130 km; 1,320 mi) at 12 knots (22 km/h; 14 mph)
- Complement: 91
- Armament: 2 × single 75 mm (3 in) gun; 6 × single 57 mm (2.2 in) guns; 4 × single 7.62 mm (0.30 in) machine guns; 3 × single 450 mm (17.7 in) torpedo tubes

Finn (Russian: Финн) was an Emir Bukharsky-class destroyer built for the Imperial Russian Navy during the first decade of the 20th century. Completed in 1906, she served in the Baltic Fleet and participated in the First World War.

== Design and description ==
The Emir Bukharsky-class ships were enlarged and improved versions of the preceding Bditelny class from 1900. Finn normally displaced 570 metric tons (560 long tons) and 666 metric tons (655 long tons) at full load. She measured 72.51 meters (237 ft 11 in) long overall with a beam of 8.2 meters (26 ft 11 in), and a draft of 3.02 meters (9 ft 11 in). The ships were propelled by two vertical triple-expansion steam engines, each driving one propeller shaft using steam from four Schulz-Thornycroft boilers. The engines were designed to produce a total of 6,500 indicated horsepower (4,800 kW) for an intended maximum speed of 25 knots (46 km/h; 29 mph). During Finn's sea trials, she reached a speed of 28 knots (52 km/h; 32 mph) from 6,394 ihp (4,768 kW). The ship carried enough coal to give her a range of 1,020 nautical miles (1,890 km; 1,170 mi) at 12 knots (22 km/h; 14 mph). Her crew numbered 91 officers and men.

The main armament of the Emir Bukharsky class consisted of two 50-caliber 75-millimeter (3 in) guns, one gun each at the forecastle and stern. Their secondary armament included six 57-millimeter (2.2 in) guns positioned on the main deck amidships, three guns on each broadside. All of the guns were fitted with gun shields. They were also fitted with four 7.62-millimeter (0.30 in) machine guns. The ships were equipped with three 450-millimeter (17.7 in) torpedo tubes in rotating mounts. Two of the single-tube mounts were located between the funnels while the third was between the aft superstructure and the rear funnel.

In 1909–1910 the ships were rearmed with a pair of 102-millimeter (4 in) Pattern 1911 Obukhov guns that replaced the 75 mm guns. All of the 57 mm guns were removed and replaced by a single 37-millimeter (1.5 in) anti-aircraft gun. The destroyers may have been modified to lay 20 mines at this time.

== Construction and career ==
Finn was laid down in 1904 by Sandvikens Skeppsdocka och Mekaniska Verkstad at their shipyard in Helsinki, Grand Duchy of Finland. The ship was launched on 22 March 1905 and entered service in 1906.

== Bibliography ==
- Apalkov, Yu. V. (1996). Боевые корабли русского флота: 8.1914-10.1917г [Combat ships of the Russian fleet: 8.1914-10.1917] (in Russian). ИНТЕК. ISBN 5-7559-0018-3.
- Berezhnoy, S.S. (2002). Крейсера и Миносцы: Справочик [Cruisers and Destroyers: A Directory] (in Russian). Ввоенное Ииздательство. ISBN 5-203-01780-8.
- Breyer, Siegfried (1992). Soviet Warship Development: Volume 1: 1917–1937. Conway Maritime Press. ISBN 0-85177-604-3.
- Budzbon, Przemysław (1985). "Russia". In Gray, Randal (ed.). Conway's All the World's Fighting Ships 1906–1921. Naval Institute Press. pp. 291–325. ISBN 0-85177-245-5.
- Campbell, N. J. M. (1979). "Russia". In Chesneau, Roger & Kolesnik, Eugene M. (eds.). Conway's All the World's Fighting Ships 1860–1905. Mayflower Books. pp. 170–217. ISBN 0-8317-0302-4.
- Halpern, Paul G. (1994). A Naval History of World War I. UCL Press. ISBN 1-85728-498-4.
- Harris, Mark (2025). The First World War in the Baltic Sea. Vol. 1: Essen's Triumph, 1914 to February 1915. Helion. ISBN 978-1-804519-10-3.
- Melnikov, R. M. (1999). Эскадренные миноносцы класса Доброволец [Volunteer-class Destroyers] (in Russian). Ed. Almanac Ships & Battles. OCLC 62741262.
- Watts, Anthony J. (1990). The Imperial Russian Navy. Arms and Armour. ISBN 0-85368-912-1.
