= Caspian Flotilla (disambiguation) =

The Caspian Flotilla is a naval force of Russia, with a lineage going back to 1722, it may also refer to:

- Astrakhan-Caspian Military Flotilla, Bolshevik force on the Volga and Northern Caspian during the Russian Civil War
- British Caspian Flotilla, a British Royal Navy force established in 1918 during the foreign intervention in the Russian Civil War
- Caspian Flotilla of White Movement, a White Movement naval force of the Russian Civil War
- Iranian navy force based at Bandar-e Anzali containing patrol boats and minesweepers

== See also ==
- Azerbaijani Navy
- Islamic Republic of Iran Navy
- Kazakhstan Naval Force
- Turkmenistan Naval Force
