= British administration of Batum =

Occupation of the Batumi Oblast by the British between 1918 and 1920

British administration of Batumi
- 1918–1920
- Flag
- Anthem: God Save the King
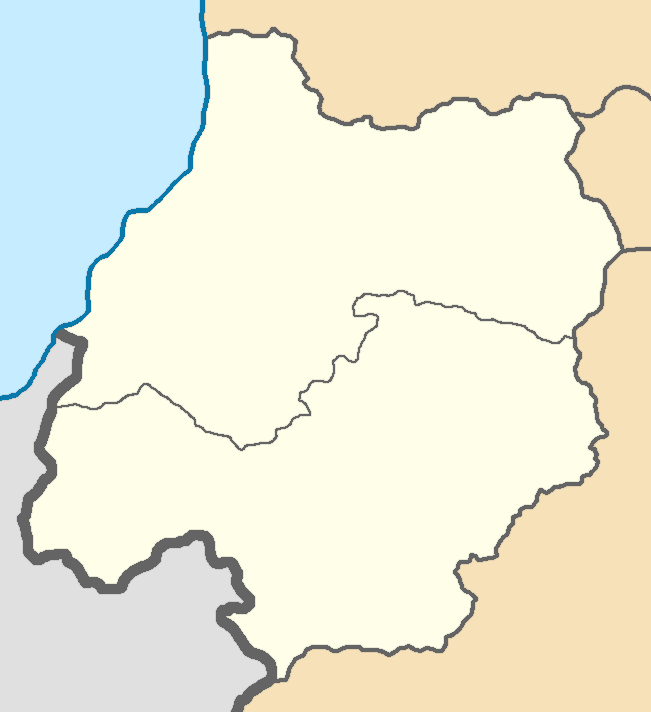
- Status: Military occupation
- Capital: Batum
- Official languages: English, Russian, Georgian, Turkish, Armenian (language of governance)
- Monarch
  - 1918–1920: George V
- Chairman of Administrative Council
  - 21 December 1918 - 28 April 1919: Pyotr Nikolayevich Maslov
- Military Governor
  - 16 December 1918 - 20 July 1920: William James Norman Cooke-Collis
- Historical era: Aftermath of World War I
  - British occupation: 16 December 1918
  - Free State of Batumi proclaimed: 8 April 1920
  - British handover of Batumi to Georgia: 20 July 1920
- Currency: Russian and Transcaucasian ruble
Preceded by	Succeeded by
Ottoman Empire	Georgian Democratic Republic

The British administration of Batum was a control of the former Batum oblast by the British Empire through a military government from 1918 to 1920. In aftermath of the Caucasus campaign of the First World War, the British troops were deployed to the Caucasus to supervise the Ottoman and German withdrawal and supply the anti-Bolsheviks forces in the Russian Civil War. The British played the dominant role among the Allies in the Caucasus per the Anglo-French Convention of 1917. The strategically important province of Batum became the only Transcaucasian province to be directly administrated by the British Empire. Its plans towards Batum varied throughout the military occupation, with some suggestions to turn Batum into the Danzig-style free city under the protection of the League of Nations. However, this led to the strong protests by the newly established Democratic Republic of Georgia, which claimed the ownership over the territory. Although the Allies declared the Free City of Batum in April 1920, the Soviet invasion of Azerbaijan and Anzali Operation raised questions among the British officials whether they would be able to defend the province while the British forces were already overstretched across the globe. Moreover, the Anglo-Soviet trade negotiations in 1920 shifted the British strategy of engaging with Bolsheviks from military intervention to the economic dealings, while the Soviets signed the treaty with Georgia in May 1920, recognizing its independence in exchange for the foreign troops hostile to Russia leaving all Georgian territories. In July 1920, the British withdrew from Batum and handed its control to the Democratic Republic of Georgia.

== History ==
=== Background ===
Former Batum oblast of the Russian Empire changed hands several times after the October Revolution and the collapse of the central authority in Russia. The province, located at the frontlines of the Caucasus campaign of the First World War, was initially controlled by the Transcaucasian Federation which emerged after the Russian Revolution. However, the peace treaty between the Soviet Russia and Central Powers signed on 3 March at Brest-Litovsk envisioned the transfer of three provinces of Russian Transcaucasia — including Batum — to the Ottomans. The Transcaucasian Federation refused to observe this treaty, which led to the Ottomans renewing their offensive in late March 1918 and capturing Batum on 1 April. However, the Ottomans did not stop, and they proceeded to continue their push towards the towns of Akhaltsikhe and Akhalkalaki. Meanwhile, the growing disagreements within the Transcaucasian Federation led to its collapse on 26 May 1918, when Georgia declared its independence, seeking an alliance with the German Empire which was not content with granting too much leeway to its Ottoman ally in the Caucasus. Although the German support helped to secure the Georgian independence, the peace treaty signed between Georgia and the Ottoman Empire on 4 June 1918 at Batum still provided that the province would remain under the Ottoman control.

The Ottoman rule would be short-lived. The defeat of the Central Powers in the First World War meant that the Ottoman and German troops would have to withdraw from the South Caucasus. Instead, the British troops were deployed to the region to supervise their withdrawal. The Allies also agreed on intervention into the Russian Civil War against the Bolsheviks, and according to the treaty signed between the United Kingdom and France on 23 December 1917, the Caucasus was designated as the British "sphere of activity".

=== British deployment ===
British officers arrived to the port city of Batum on 4 and 12 December 1918, while the British ships dispatched first round of British troops and the head of the British mission General William Montgomerie Thomson on 15 December. By this point, 40,000 Ottoman troops had left the province but there were 12,000 of them still remaining. The Georgian government, hoping for cooperation with the Allies, agreed to the deployment of the British troops to Tiflis on 24 December 1918. In a meeting with the British and American representatives in Batum, Georgian parliamentary deputy Diomid Topuridze and General Aleksandr Gedevanishvili expressed their desire to support the Allied efforts against the Bolsheviks. The Britain first established control over Batum and it served as a disembarkation point for the British troops to spread out across Georgia. The British also met with the Mayor of Batum, who welcomed them and lamented the decline of the city under the Ottoman occupation.

Batum would become the only province to be administrated directly by the British authorities under the Military Governor James Cooke-Collis. This could be attributed to the several factors: the port was strategically important, as it served as a "key to the Caucasus". Also, its ownership was highly contested between various parties and the Baku oil flowed through the pipeline to the port of Batum. The British troops could also be swiftly withdrawn if necessary from the port. Similarly to Riga, the British established the national council in Batum under the Military Governor James Cooke-Collis. It was composed of the representatives of different nationalities in the province. The body was called Council for the Administration of Batoum and its Region and was officially inaugurated in late December. It included two Russians, two Georgians and one Greek. Prilidian Maslov, Russian Constitutional Democrat, was appointed as the head of the council, which was protested by the Georgian representatives. On 30 December, the Ottoman administration of the city handed formal power to the council. The British military authorities and the council exercised the dual authority.

The British military authority and the Batum city duma requisitioned 27 buildings in the city by mid-January of 1919 for the placement of the council and the British troops, which occasionally drew protests. The council reorganized the sewage system in the city, as the city fell into the unsanitary condition during the Ottoman occupation and typhus ravaged across Batum. The council would forward the requests for requisitioning the buildings, material, and supplies to the military authorities, but the council itself was not entitled to carry out these measures. Eventually, the council was disbanded by the military authorities on 15-16 April 1919. The British took over its functions, such as the police authority and nearly all aspects of the governance. They would issue proclamations in English, Russian, Georgian, Ottoman Turkish, and Armenian languages. For example, the British ordered the registration of all motor cars in the Batum city and regulated the selling of the alcohol. Some of the measures enacted by the British military authorities to maintain law and order were draconian, reminiscent of other post-war occupations. The violation of the British regulations would result in being tried by court-martial under the military law if the wrongdoing caused an injury or death. In some cases the British set the fixed prices to prevent speculation.

=== British withdrawal ===
Throughout the British presence, the British policymakers debated the issue of the Transcaucasus. Some perceived the Transcaucasus as the outfield of the Great Game, while others were worried about the overstretching of the Empirial forces and were more concerned about more traditional British spheres of influence amidst the instability in Ireland, Egypt, India, Afghainstan and Turkey. Chief of the Imperial General Staff, Henry Wilson, was one of the principal opponents of the Transcaucasian policy. Because of this, the British government ordered the British withdrawal from the Caucasus on 3 July 1919. However, George Milne, the Commander-in-Chief of the British Army of the Black Sea, raised questions about the implications of the withdrawal from Batum, arguing for the continued British presence to maintain order until the fate of the province would be decided at the Paris Peace Conference. His position was shared by George Curzon, British Foreign Secretary, who argued for maintaininig a small garrison in Batum. The Foreign Office argued that the British withdrawal would cause the port to become an object of strife between Georgia and the Denikin's forces, while Azerbaijan and Armenia could also attempt to claim the province, which would destabilize the region. Curzon saw Batum as a prestigious base which could be of great use for the Britain to influence whole Middle East, while the withdrawal could cause instability which would negatively impact the British interests in the Middle East and possibly also India. Henry Wilson and the War Office, on the other hand, argued that small garrison would not be able to defend against any attack and that the British forces were spread thin.

By September 1919, the British evacuated the Caucasus except Batum, which the British cabinet decided to keep to prevent the scramble for the port and to shift the focus of all parties on fighting Bolsheviks instead. Wilson also agreed to maintain the troops for the short amount of time. However, this compromise would be challenged by the defeat of the Denikin's troops in the Northern Caucasus in January 1920, which led to the meeting of the Supreme Council of Allied Powers over their future policy in the Caucasus. They decided that they would sent material aid to the Transcaucasian republics against the Bolsheviks, but no additional troops. British Prime Minister David Lloyd George was also convinced that the Bolsheviks would not threaten Mesopotamia and the British India, despite the attempts by Curzon to change his opinion. Curzon and the Foreign Office were still trying to maintain the British presence in Batum, which by this time amounted to 3,000 troops. On 14 January, the British cabinet ordered to withdraw from Batum when there would be appropriate "military grounds", but this led to disagreements over the interpretation.

On 3 February 1920, the French withdrew their troops from Constantinople, which led to Wilson obtaining approval to relocate all British troops from Batum to protect Constantinople instead. However, Curzon protested and proposed to turn Batum into a Danzig-style free city under the protection of the League of Nations, which he thought would be dominated by the British. This proposal managed to eursuade the Cabinet, and one British and one Indian battalion remained in Batum. However, the Cabinet tasked Curzon with convincing the French and Italians to commit to enforcing the League of Nations mandate with their own troops too. Curzon managed to agree both of them to provide one battalion each under the command of Milne, and on 25 February the Allied Supreme Council declared the Free City of Batum. This however led to the protests by the Georgian government and it moved Georgian troops to the province, securing its outlying portions in Artvin and Khulo areas. The British protested in return and threatened to evict the Georgian troops by force, but the Georgian government, knowing that it was now regarded as a bulwark against the further spread of Bolshevism, told the British Military Governor of Batum Cooke-Collis that the Georgian withdrawal from Batum could cause the fall of the Georgian government to more radical groups and a possible Bolshevik outbreak in the country. The Georgian diplomatic maneuver worked, as despite Cooke-Collis advocating for the use of force, Curzon was more cautios to prevent the Anglo-Georgian conflict and the Georgian forces remained at the outlying areas of the province. Furthermore, in March 1920, at the London Conference it was decided that the League of Nations would not assume the responsibilities for Batum. Moreover, the Soviets advanced along the coast in the direction of Batum in April 1920, while the British force at Batum was not enough to defend the province against the potential invasion. The Admirality of the British Mediterranean Fleet was actually willing to engage the Bolsheviks from sea and block their potential advance north of Sukhum, but the War Office was in strong opposition and the Army Council voted to withdraw on 15 April 1920. The San Remo conference did not manage to secure the support for engaging the Bolsheviks, with Curzon and Milne ultimately agreeing to withdraw. British Secretary of State for War Winston Churchill asssessed the continued control of Batum as presenting "no advantages but only danger".

Although War Office ordered Milne to withdraw on 3 May, Curzon was more optimistic now after the Bolshevik advance continued through Azerbaijan rather than the Caucasus Mountains passes and Black Sea coastal road. This gave the British more time and proved predictions by some that the Soviets could not attack through those routes as fighting there would be difficult. Moreover, Soviets were involved in a large-scale conflict with Poland and Curzon thought that they would not risk a conflict with the Allies. Curzon even managed to persuade the French to send Algerian battalion to Batum on 17 May 1920, but Italians refused. This led to Wilson and Churchill to press further for "forthwith" withdrawal. The situation made Curzon to modify his position — he now supported making Batumi a free port under the administration of Georgia and granting the free access for transit through Batum to Armenia and Azerbaijan to avoid any potential conflicts. He pressed again for the retention of the British troops in the province, arguing that the withdrawal would damage the British prestige and would cause the Transcaucasian states to fall under the Bolsheviks. However, the War Office refused any British presence, arguing that Georgia and local population did not support it and that the town was indefensible. Wilson feared the repetition of the Northern Russian fiasco, which started with 150 troops but ended up involving 20,000 British soldiers in an unsuccessful campaign, seeing repetition of this as detrimental amidst the overextention of the Imperial forces.

Meanwhile, the negotiations on the trade agreement opened between the United Kingdom and the Soviet Russia. During this negotiation, the sides agreed that Russia would recognize Batum as a part of Georgia and that the British and French troops would withdraw from it. The British now sought to prevent the threat coming from the Bolsheviks by an economic engagement. This finally settled the question of Batum. On 11 June, the British Cabinet ordered the province of Batum to be handed to Georgia. On 28 June, Georgia signed the agreements with the United Kingdom, with the UK transferring the province to Georgia, while Georgia would guarantee free transit through the port and the Georgian railways to Armenia and Azerbaijan and a construction of a railway from Batum to the Armenian frontier.

On 7 July 1920, Batum was handed to Georgia, and the British and French troops finally withdrew on 9 July. British Colonel Claude Stokes and the Chief British Commissioner to Transcaucasus Oliver Wardrop, concerned that the British withdrawal could be interpreted as an abandonment of the Transcaucasian states, pushed for the Britain to provide military aid to these countries and recognize their de jure independence. The Bolsheviks, meanwhile, were advancing against Whites and sought Georgia as an ally, but Georgia refused and claimed neutrality. The Soviet government condemned Georgia for the "supposed neutrality" and pushed it to oppose Allied plans on placement of their military forces on the Georgian territory. When the Soviet government took over North Caucasus and Azerbaijan, it began to threaten Georgia with an invasion, but on 7 May 1920, anxious about the Allied presence in Georgia, it signed an agreement with Georgia, defining the borders and ending the territorial disputes. The treaty prohibited the placement of any foreign forces and military bases deemed as a threat to the RSFSR on the Georgian territory, which also played a role in the British withdrawal as the Soviets argued during the trade negotiations with the UK that they recognized Batum as a Georgian territory and regarded the British and French presence as fettering "the free expression of the will of the population".

== Assessment ==
According to Georgian historian Beka Kobakhidze, the British withdrawal from the region signified the changing military and political disposition. Due to the Soviet invasion of Azerbaijan and the fall of Baku, Batum became less relevant in terms of strategic importance. Also, it made impossible to protect Georgia from the Soviets according to the Allied viewpoint. The Soviet attack on the British fleet at Persian port of Enzeli and the surrender of the British fleet also dissuaded the Allies from keeping the Batum garrison. The Georgian government was happy about the return of Batum, but it also signified that the Britain and other Western powers would not be willing to protect Georgia against the Soviet invasion.

== Public attitudes ==
The native inhabitants of the former Batum oblast were Adjarians, a sub-group of Georgians (sometimes referred to as the Muslim Georgians). Under the lengthy Ottoman rule, which actively favored Muslims over Christians, many Adjarians converted to Islam; however, despite their conversion to Islam, Adjarians retained the Georgian language (with their own dialect), and to some extent Georgian traditional culture and self-identification.

The British occupation was not popular among the locals. At the same time, different ethnic groups in the region were constantly coming into the conflict as they fought for their own sovereignty.

In April 1919, a British foreign office representative argued that "we have deliberately set up a British military governor advised by a mixed local council, as the population is heterogeneous and mostly Moslem, and is strongly averse from being placed under the Georgian Govt at Tiflis".

The Committee for the Liberation of Muslim Georgia, headed by Memed Abashidze and Haidar Abashidze, repeatedly advocated for the establishment of autonomy based on religious principles within the borders of Georgia. On July 24, 1919, a rally of Muslim Georgians, residents of Batumi and its environs, was held, at which a resolution signed by Memed Abashidze was adopted, which ended with the words: "Long live an autonomous Muslim Georgia, within the borders of a common motherland!". To achieve this goal, on August 31 of the same year, a congress of representatives of Muslim Georgia was held in Batumi, the participants of which advocated for the reunification of Batumi and the Batumi region "with their natural homeland — the Republic of Georgia, on the basis of broad autonomy for Muslim Georgia". At the congress, the prototype of the parliament of Adjara — the Mejlis of Muslim Georgia — was elected. Abashidze's faction resolutely advocated for union with Georgia. The desire for autonomy was strong even among pro-Georgian Adjarans. Another, smaller group promoted pro-Turkish and pan-Turkist ideas.

On March 7, 1920, the Muslim Society of the City of Batum and its Region, together with the Russian Committee in Batum, announced in connection with the upcoming evacuation of the last British troops from Batum that "In the event of the final abandonment of Batum by British troops, the entire Batum region, together with the adjacent districts, is to be declared independent, with Batum as its capital," while guaranteeing "free use of the Batum port to all Transcaucasian republics." The upcoming convocation of the parliament of the independent Adjaran Republic was also announced. However, not all Muslims of Batum region agreed with the independence. On March 23, the newspaper "Brdzola" in Tiflis published a statement by the National Council of United Muslims of the Batum region, in which they declared that "we demand the unification of the city of Batum and the Batum region, this inseparable part of Georgia, with Mother Georgia."

On April 23, 1920, the Majlis of Muslim Georgia confirmed the desire of the Muslim Georgians of Batumi to unite with Georgia and spoke out against the possible dismemberment of the Batumi region by "the separation of the city of Batumi into a separate unit and its transfer to the League of Nations".

== Sources ==
- Coggeshall, Samuel (2023). "Chapter 5: Tiflis, 1918-1922" (PDF). Revolutionary Frontiers: British and Soviet Missions and the Making of National Borders in the Russian Civil War. University of Columbia.
- Rose, John (1980). "Batum as Domino, 1919-1920: The Defence of India in Transcaucasia". The International History Review. 7 (2).
- "Batumi: Travails of the City". Civil Georgia. 7 July 2020.
- Ben Cahoon. "Georgia". World Statesmen.org.
- Kopisto, Lauri (2011). The British Intervention in South Russia 1918-1920. Helsinki: University of Helsinki. ISBN 9789521069239.
- Berge, Bjørn (2017). Nowherelands: An Atlas of Vanished Countries 1840-1975. Thames & Hudson. ISBN 9780500519905.
