= Anzali Operation =

Naval and amphibious action during the Russian Civil War

- Part of the Southern Front of the Russian Civil War and the Jangali rebellion in Gilan
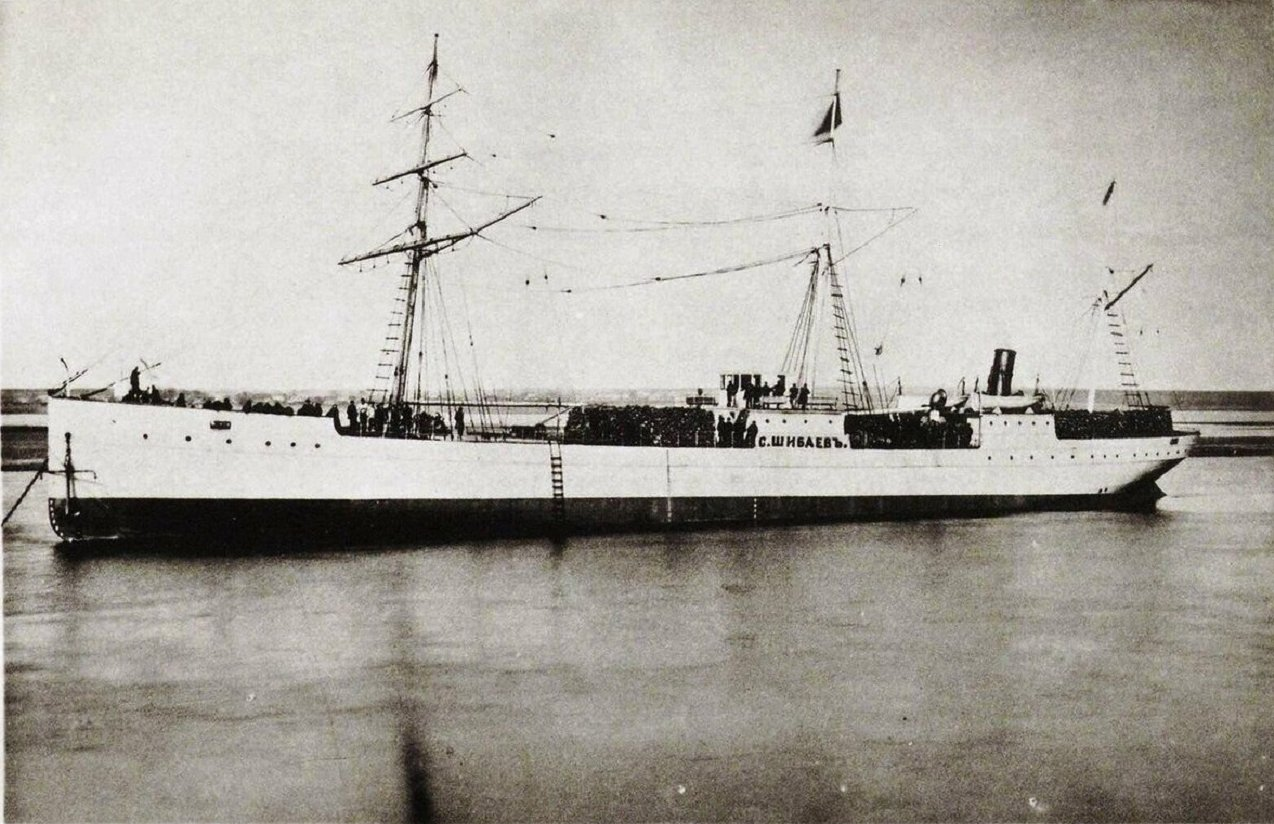
- Seaplane tender Orlenok, seized by the Soviets at Anzali
Date	18 May 1920
Location	Bandar-e Anzali
Result	Soviet victory; Eventual establishment of the Persian Socialist Soviet Republic; Decline of British influence in Persia

Belligerents
United Kingdom; White Russia	Russian SFSR; Persian Jangalis

Commanders and leaders
(British Raj) Hugh Bateman-Champain (surrendered)	(Russian Soviet Federative Socialist Republic) Fedor Raskolnikov

Units involved
British North Persia Force	Soviet Caspian Flotilla

Strength
10 auxiliary cruisers other auxiliary ships 6 seaplanes 500 soldiers	4 auxiliary cruisers 4 destroyers 1 transport minor ships 2,000 naval troops

Casualties and losses
2 dead 5 wounded Garrison and fleet in harbour surrender	None

The Anzali Operation was a naval and amphibious action carried by the Soviet Caspian Flotilla during the Russian Civil War. The target was the White Russian Caspian Flotilla interned at Anzali, Iran, which was under the custody of the British North Persian Force. The British troops were surrounded and forced to capitulate, while the flotilla was captured by the Soviets.

== Background ==
The Russian Civil War in Caspian Sea saw previous confrontation between the Soviet Russian Caspian Flotilla against the British Caspian Flotilla, the latter supporting the White movement as part of the Allied intervention. British/White Russians scored a victory during the Battle of Alexandrovsky Fort, but the harbor was reconquered in April 1920.

After the disbandment of the British Caspian Flotilla and the withdrawal of their successor the White Caspian Flotilla to Anzali, Iran, a British military detachment had been in charge of the remainder ships, that had all the breechblocks removed from their guns.

Meanwhile in Moscow, Trotsky and Lenin concurred that a military strike against White die-hards and British forces entrenched on Persian territory would not only recover the warships and military material formerly in hands of White general Anton Denikin and now under control of Britain, but also would be a blow to British power in northern Persia.

== Action ==
The Soviet Russian Caspian Flotilla gathered a considerable force to attack Anzali. The task force was composed of four auxiliary cruisers (Proletariy, Rosa Luxemburg, Pushkin, Bela Kun), four destroyers (Karl Liebknecht, Delnyi, Deyatelnyi, Rastoropnyi), two gunboats (Kars and Ardagan) the transport Gretsiya and other minor units. Complete surprise was achieved; early in the morning, naval shelling hit the main British headquarters as the first landing parties destroyed the telegraph lines. Wave after wave, 2,000 Bolshevik put a foot on the beach surrounding the British garrison. Subsequently, negotiators were sent by the British on a motor torpedo boat to agree on capitulation terms. Gurkha troops attempted a counterattack, but were repelled by the Soviet bombardment, suffering two dead and five wounded. Once Hugh Bateman-Champain, the British commander, accepted the Bolshevik terms, resistance from the 500-strong garrison stationed quickly collapsed.

The Persian governor formally accepted the Soviet Russian presence. The British/White detachment capitulated and fled the city on ground, while the entire flotilla was seized without resistance. Seized ships included: auxiliary cruisers President Kruger, America, Europe, Africa, Dmitry Donskoy, Asia, Slava, Mylutin, Opyt and Merkur, the motor-torpedo-boat carrier (previously seaplane carrier) Orlenok, the seaplane-carrier (previously m.t.b. carrier) Volga, six seaplanes, four British motor torpedo boats, ten merchants, a number of support, auxiliary and minor units in addition to large amount of supplies and ammunition.

== Aftermath ==
The Anzali Operation marked the ending of the Russian Civil War naval confrontation in the Caspian Sea. The action also resulted in the establishment of the short-lived Persian Socialist Soviet Republic on 5 June 1920, with little British resistance, while a detachment of 800 Cossacks surrendered to the Soviets and Persian socialists or "Jangalis".

The withdrawal of the British garrison, and the loss of the White fleet along with the earlier capture by Raskolnikov flotilla of the British naval mission at Baku, who had been in transit to Anzali to take charge of the maintenance of the warships, prompted a widespread reaction of the British Cabinet and the public opinion. On 21 May, the government decided the transfer of British troops from Persian soil to Iraq, Palestine and India. A number of political analysts at the time, among them Arnold Toynbee, denounced what they perceived as a decline of British influence on the Caucasus and Persia itself.

The Persian National Consultative Assembly refused, in effect, to ratify the British-Persian Treaty of 1919, giving a fatal blow to Lord Curzon's "forward defense" of India policy.
