= Anglo-French Convention of 1917 =

Treaty during World War I

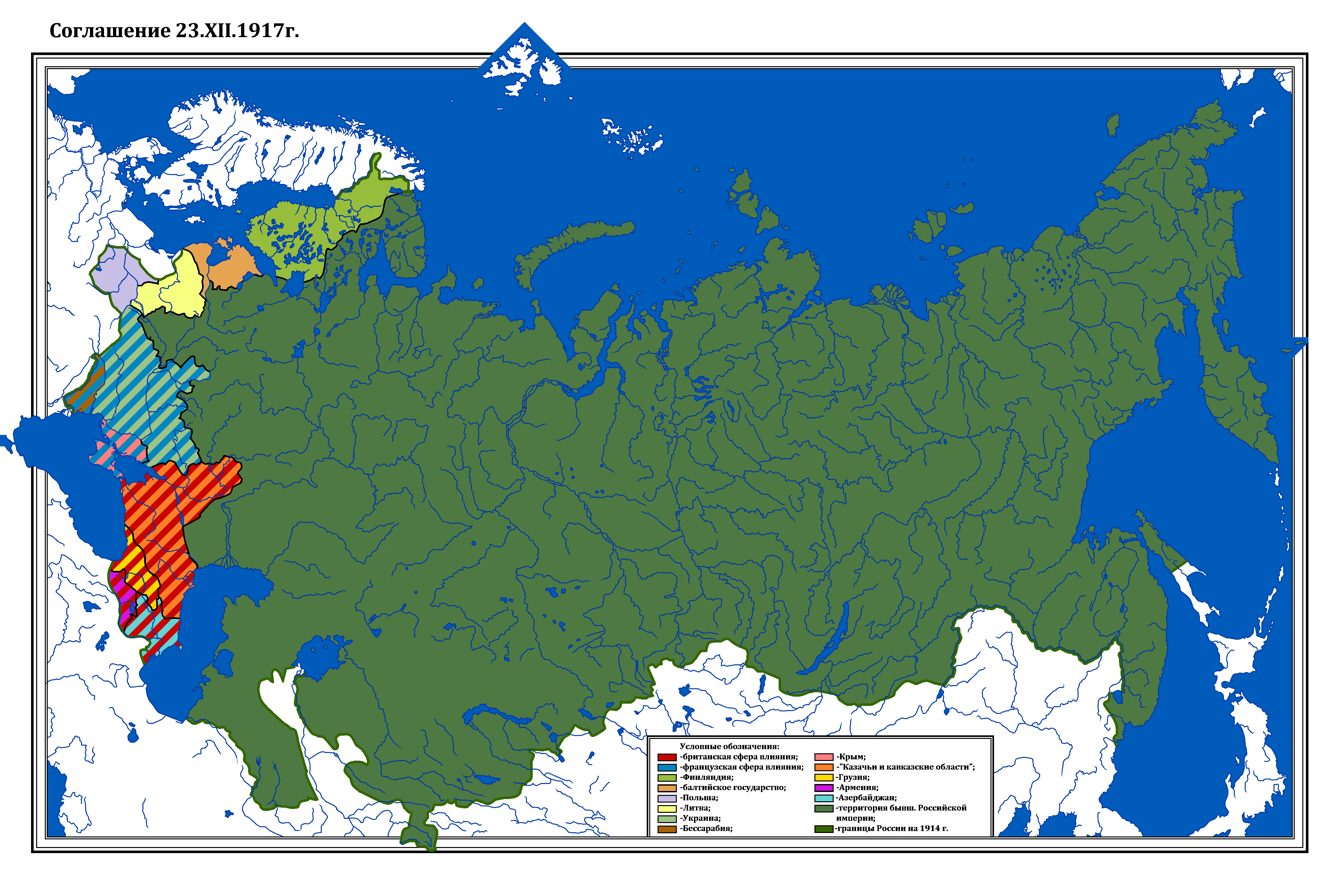
- The zones of activities according to the treaty: Blue stipes — France; Red stripes — United Kingdom.
- Signed: 23 December 1917; 108 years ago
- Location: Paris
- Condition: Ratification
- Parties: United Kingdom France

Full text
- Anglo-French convention of 1917 at Wikisource

The Convention between France and England on the subject of activity in Southern Russia was signed on 23 December 1917 between the United Kingdom and the French Third Republic. With the October Revolution and the Armistice between Russia and the Central Powers, the Allied Powers had to reformulate their policy towards Russia. The Allies wanted to keep Russia in war and were concerned that Russia's abundant natural resources would be used to allow Germany to bypass the Allied blockade. With the new Bolshevik government aiming to sign a peace treaty with Germany, which could potentially lead to the Russia's natural resources ending up in German hands, the Allies launched efforts to deny these vital supplies to the Germans by aiding the various anti-Bolshevik groups in the former Russian Empire willing to continue fighting against the Central Powers and to restore Russia as an Anglo-French ally. These groups included nascent White movement, Cossacks, and pro-independence movements such as Ukrainian People's Republic. The initial Allied efforts would concentrate on the south of the former Russian empire, where a big part of these groups were located. The treaty was signed on 23 December and divided territory as the "British" and "French zone of activity": British one including the Caucasus, Don and Kuban regions, while the French one including Ukraine, Bessarabia and Crimea. The treaty served as a basis for the Allied intervention in the Russian Civil War.

== Background ==
The Russian Revolution of February 1917 made Britain and France look for a new approach in their Russian policy. The revolution rendered the Russian army largely combat ineffective, while the Kornilov affair conclusively proved that any efforts to restore discipline would be futile. However, the Allies were still interested in keeping Russia in alliance, as even though it was no longer expected to contribute much to the war effort, the Russian withdrawal from war threatened to allow Germany to trade with Russia for natural resources, which would render the Allied blockade of Germany ineffective. Moreover, the Allies were concerned about the fate of pre-war and war credits provided to Russia during the First World War. The Bolshevik revolution in October further complicated the Allied situation, as the Bolshevik government opened the negotiations at Brest-Litovsk on 16 December 1917 to conclude a separate peace treaty with Central Powers. Thus, the Allies prepared to establish contacts with anti-Bolshevik forces to restore Russia as an ally.

Already in early December 1917, the British government formulated its new Russian policy of providing financial support to any responsible anti-Bolshevik movement in Russia. In mid-December the Britain approved 20 million pounds to assist various groups willing to continue fighting against Germany in Russia. The British War cabinet however was divided over its future Russian policy. Britain wanted to keep Russia in the war, but some feared that by assisting the anti-Bolshevik forces, which were not very combat-effective, the Allies would push the Bolsheviks closer to Germany. However, others argued that it would be impossible to reconcile the relations with the Soviet Russia with the intentions to keep it in war, since the Bolshevik power rested on their promise of making peace, thus they would eventually accept some peace arrangement with Germany. It was moreover revealed that the Germans were demanding the rights to Russia's natural resources in negotiations, and it was likely that Russia would agree to these demands, which threatened whole Allied blockade of Germany. Another Allied concern was helping the Kingdom of Romania after the Russian withdrawal from war.

Meanwhile, the revolutions led to the increasing disintegration of the Russian Empire. In the south-eastern Russia, the Don and Kuban Cossacks, the cultural minorities of Russia, established their representative assemblies and elected atamans already during the Russian Republic. Although they did not seek secession from Russia, their relationship with the provisional Russian government of Kerensky quickly broke down, while the Bolshevik takeover and chaos in Russia forced them to take drastic measures against the new authorities. Already on 16 October 1917, they organized the "South-Eastern Union" to fight the Bolsheviks, while in December, the Volunteer Army began to be organized in the Don region. Meanwhile, the various independence movements gained traction in Ukraine and the Caucasus regions. During the Bolshevik takeover, the Ukrainian Rada declared the independence of the Ukrainian People's Republic on 20 November 1917, only for it to be invaded by Bolsheviks on 4 December. In the Northern Caucasus, the "Union of Mountain Peoples" was founded, seeking to unite with the South-Eastern Union, although it struggled to establish control over all of its claimed territories. In Transcaucasia, meanwhile, the newly organized Transcaucasian Commissariat proved to be quite resistant to the Bolshevik troops. The anti-Bolshevik independence movements provided a potent ground for the Allies to implement their policy in the former Russian empire.

== Treaty ==
On 21 December, the British government received an offer from the French ambassador to delimitate the zones of French and British activities in southern Russia to better coordinate the new Russian policy: Britain would deal with the Caucasus and Don, which were closer to Persia, while France would deal with Romania and Ukraine.

On 23 December, the British officers George Milner and Frederick Maurice, and Lord Robert Cecil met with French Prime Minister Georges Clemenceau and General Foch in Paris. The Allies decided that they "must not simply antagonise the Bolsheviks without establishing effective resistance to Germany in southern Russia". It was agreed that each country would keep the unofficial relations with the Bolsheviks, striving to convince them that the Allies were not involved in the internal Russian politics and to prevent the Bolsheviks from getting too close to Germany, but the Allies would also keep up their support for anti-Bolshevik forces. They would aim at preventing the Ukrainian wheat from reaching Germany and supporting Armenians and Georgians, two nations in the Caucasus which were "the only barrier to the development of a Muslim movement from Constantinople to China, which would provide Germany with a weapon of even greater danger to world peace than control of the Baghdad railway". The Allies also agreed to assist Romania. They emphasized that they should not get involved in the Russian Civil War and should maintain ties with the Bolsheviks. If the Bolsheviks still complained that the Allies were fostering the civil war with their actions, the Allies would deny this and point out their objective of countering Germany, but if the situation reached the boiling point, the Allies would rather "keep in with the Ukraine, and let the Bolsheviks join up with Germany".

There was a disagreement over the spheres of activity, namely, Clemenceau argued for the Don Cossacks to be included in the French zone to allow France to work properly; however, the British considered it impractical because they had information that the Cossacks were working on forming the South-Eastern Union with the Caucasus. Moreover, the Ukrainian Rada was strongly socialist, and it would be advisable for the French to refrain from interacting with White officers like Mikhail Alekseyev and Alexey Kaledin who were based in Don.

At the end of the meeting, the "Convention between France and England on the subject of activity in southern Russia" was signed between the countries. Thus, Britain and France divided their spheres of activity in the south of the former Russian empire. Namely, Bessarabia, Ukraine, and Crimea were assigned to France, while the British zone encompassed the Cossack lands and the Caucasus. The Allies sought to avoid a confrontation with the Bolsheviks; their meeting and agreement were extremely confidential. The agreement was signed on 23 December pending the approval by the respective governments. On 26 December, Lord Robert Cecil submitted the agreement to the War Cabinet, and it was approved. Later the intervention expanded to the other areas and the British zone was tacitly expanded to include Russian North, while the French zone tacitly included Poland.

== Implementation ==
The immediate execution of the new Allied policy involved sending financial aid and military officers to organize the anti-Bolshevik troops. France agreed to provide 100 million francs to General Alekseyev at Novocherkassk even before the signing of the convention. The British intelligence officers worked out a "Bank Scheme" with the Russian banker Karol Jaroszyński to buy the Russian banks in the "British zone" for the purpose of countering the German finance in Russia. The British government gave a loan to Jaroszynski to buy majority of securities in five Russian banks and establish the "Cossack bank" to fund the Don Cossacks and the Volunteer army. However, the British funds arrived too late, and in February 1918, the Bolshevik army captured the Don. Even though the Allies sought to avoid a direct confrontation with the Bolsheviks, they still found out about the British activity and started attacking the British in their rhetoric, which led to the breakdown of the relations. However, the Allies initially did maintain working relations with Soviet Russia, as the new British ambassador R. H. Bruce Lockhart was appointed in January 1918 to hamper Russian-German peace talks as much as possible, and the Bolsheviks periodically did negotiate with Allies to receive their aid before the Treaty of Brest-Litovsk, although the talks on the Soviet Russia refusing to sign or ratify the peace treaty with Germany in exchange for Allied aid ultimately bore no results.

The initial French and British intervention efforts failed. After the signing of the convention, the French officers and agents began to arrive in Ukraine from the Russian general headquarters at Mogilev and from Romania. Ukraine was granted 50 million roubles in aid. However, Ukraine soon changed sides and accepted funds from Austria-Hungary and Germany. The Bolsheviks tried to push for their terms during the negotiations with the Germans under the "no war, no peace" approach; however, this only led to the renewed Central Powers offensive in February 1918. As a result, the treaty of Brest-Litovsk was signed on 3 March 1918, with even harsher terms for the Soviet Russia. The German and Austrian armies then took control of Ukraine, while the Ottoman army advanced in the Caucasus. This further complicated the Allied situation, although the British agents were still able to sabotage many railways, bridges and ammunition dumps before the German advance and bribe the local soviet and sailors in Novorossiysk to scuttle the two dreadnoughts, six destroyers, and thirty transport and cargo steamers before the German arrival. The British sent the military agency to Tiflis to assist the Transcaucasian Commissariat (the South Caucasus not having declared independence from the Russian Republic yet) to organize the units of Armenian and Georgian volunteers to fight the Ottoman army. The agency was headed by Colonel Pike, and he provided five million roubles to the Transcaucasian Commissariat and 150,000 roubles to White officer Kornilov in the Kuban. However, this did not work out well as the Ottoman offensive continued unabated, which forced Georgia to seek German assistance in countering the Turks, with the German troops soon arriving at Poti. This forced the British mission to move from Tiflis to Vladikavkaz. However, the Terek Cossacks assisted by the British agency there also failed in their struggle against the Bolsheviks, and in July 1918, Pike died, while the rest of the agency was arrested by the Bolsheviks.

In August 1918, Britain sent two battalions known as Dunsterforce to protect the oil-rich city of Baku in Azerbaijan against the Ottoman offensive. The British assistance was requested by the Centrocaspian Dictatorship proclaimed by the local Socialist-Revolutionary and Dashnak forces after they forced the Bolsheviks out of the government and took control of the city. The British force, however, consisted of only 1,300 men and could not resist the army of 15,000 men and 32 guns led by Nuri Pasha. After the six weeks of fighting, the city finally fell to the Ottomans, with the British suffering 20% casualties and evacuating on 14 September.

After the Treaty of Brest-Litovsk, the Allied and Bolshevik confrontation became more intense, and the Allies started to act openly against the Bolsheviks, with the Bolshevik government claiming to uncover the "Lockhart Plot" allegedly aiming to assassinate Lenin on behalf of the British intelligence services. After the armistice and the end of the First World War, there was no longer the German threat; however, the relations with the Bolsheviks were already hostile by this point, and the sides were in a de facto state of war. Moreover, the Bolsheviks were seen as a hostile force due to their ideology and rhetoric, and a threat to spread the Bolshevik revolution to Europe. Moreover, the defeated Germany could use Soviet Russia to reverse the results of its defeat and regain its strength, as the Bolshevik takeover was from the very beginning seen by the Allies as a German plot to undermine the Allied efforts.

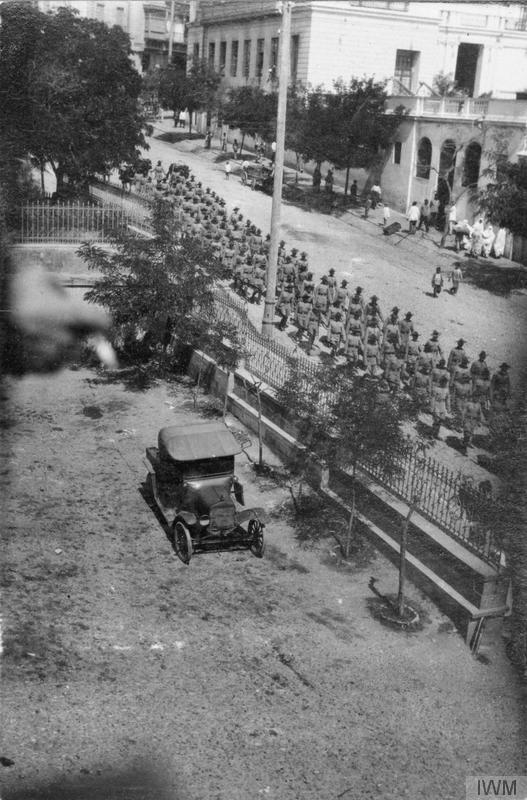
Demonstration of British force in Baku, July 1919.

Due to these factors, the Allies continued their presence in the former Russian empire after the armistice. The British War cabinet decided to increase its presence in the Southern Caucasus and to assist White General Anton Denikin. In November and December 1918, two full British divisions occupied the Baku oilfields of Azerbaijan, and Batumi and Tiflis in Georgia, establishing control over the Transcaucasian railway. This amounted to 40,000 men deployed to the Caucasus, making it the largest British contingent in the entire former Russian Empire. On 25 November, the British military mission led by Lieutenant-Colonel Blackwood arrived at Ekaterinorad, Kuban to examine the Denikin's army. The commander of the mission, Major-General F.C. Poole, arrived to Novorossiysk on 3 December 1918. Both in Novorossiisk and Ekaterinodar, the British officers were greeted with celebrations and little paper Union Jacks. The Anglo-French convention was reconfirmed in London almost exactly a year later after its signing.

The British post-armistice policy, however, was rather contradictory: on the one hand, many British officials emphasized that Britain could not afford to commit many resources to an all-out intervention against the Bolsheviks after fighting the costly First World War; however, neither was Britain willing to accept the Bolshevik rule over Russia. The British War Cabinet ultimately decided to carry on with the intervention, although the issue continued to weigh on the British officials. Moreover, the Britain faced yet another problem — in an effort to create a formidable anti-Bolshevik alliance, the Britain had to support both White forces, which wanted to restore "united and indivisible Russia" on one hand, and the independence movements like those of Georgians and Azerbaijanis on the other hand. The most serious crisis developed over Georgia when the British prohibited Denikin from attacking Georgia instead of the Bolsheviks, which caused Denikin's anger over British policies, who was already not happy about the British and French division of former imperial Russian lands into their "zones".

The British prime minister Lloyd George was rather reluctant about the British intervention, viewing it as too costly and futile. He compared the British efforts to the unsuccessful intervention in the French Revolution and argued that the British effort could actually boost patriotism in Russia in support of the Bolsheviks. At the meeting of the Imperial War Cabinet, Canadian Prime Minister Robert Borden suggested a peaceful solution to the conflict. Supported by the US president Woodrow Wilson, Lloyd George was dedicated to solving the Russian conflict peacefully, inviting all participating sides to the Prinkipo conference, which would take place alongside the Paris Peace Conference on 15 February 1919. However, only the Bolsheviks and the Baltic states accepted the invitations, which resulted in a failure of Lloyd George. This gave the new Secretary of State for War Winston Churchill, who was more interventionist and opposed Lloyd George's approach, a freer hand to interpret the War Cabinet's decision on Russian aid, sending material, volunteers and advisers to the Whites, especially concentrating on the Southern Front of the Russian Civil War.

The British expressed their support for unifying the anti-Bolshevik forces under the command of Denikin, siding with him in his conflict with the Don Cossack ataman Pyotr Krasnov. Denikin enjoyed the biggest support from the Allies as he was always firmly on the Allied side and never contemplated siding with Germany. British representative Poole arrived at Don Army headquarters and threatened to withhold any support to Cossacks unless they accepted Denikin's authority, which led to Krasnov relenting. On 8 January 1919, the agreement was signed, which submitted the Don Army to the Armed Forces of South Russia, while Krasnov was ultimately removed from his post of ataman, being replaced by more pro-Allied General Bokaievski in February.

In January, Britain sent material to equip 250,000 men, a mission of 90 men and 100 planes, 25,000 poison gas shells, and Churchill also diverted 50 aeroplanes and twelve tanks originally destined for Admiral Kolchak's Army in Siberia to Denikin. The Allied shipment proceeded through Port of Novorossiysk, where a supply base was established. In February, the permanent military mission was established with Denikin's Armed Forces of South Russia called "The British Military Mission, South Russia", and Lieutenant-General Charles Briggs was appointed as its commander.

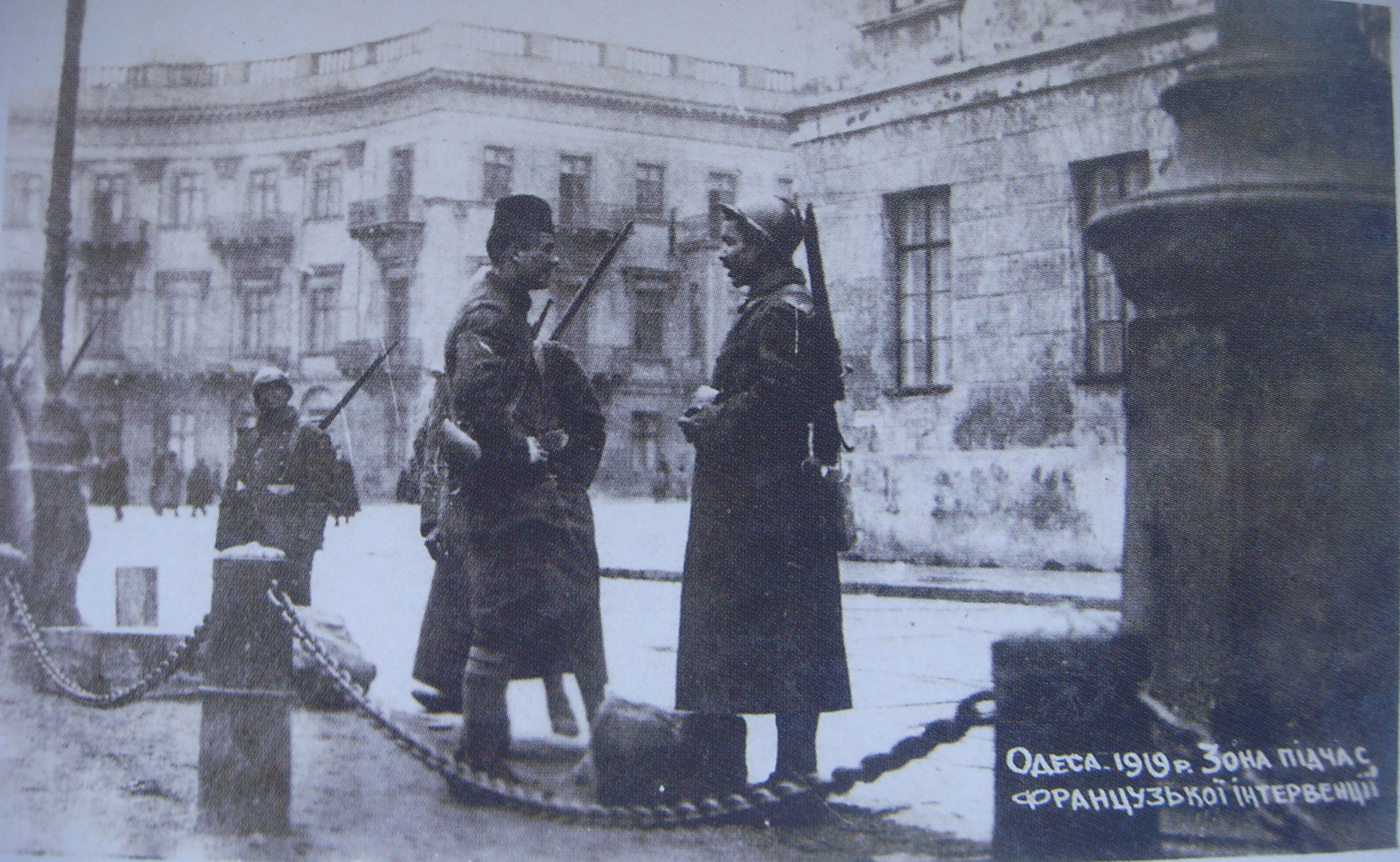
French soldiers deployed in Odessa.

However, the Allied intervention in the Russian Civil War continued to dwindle, as France began to reformulate its policy, while the United States was returning to the pre-war isolationism. France sent its first troops to Ukraine in December 1918, when the pro-German Ukrainian State led by Hetman Pavlo Skoropadsky's government began to collapse immediately after the German withdrawal. The Whites managed to advance in Ukraine, where they were opposed by the Directorate of Ukraine led by Symon Petliura and the Bolsheviks. The French troops initially landed in Odesa but were met with the Ukrainian resistance, although they managed to overcome it with the Volunteer Army's support. However, France took a pro-Ukrainian stance and began to see Whites as opposing its plans for an independent Ukraine, which led to a crisis between France and Britain, which sided with the Whites, seeing French actions as jeopardizing anti-Bolshevik activities. However, the French intervention was short-lived, as the Bolsheviks soon advanced in Ukraine in March 1919, and French troops withdrew to Odesa, ultimately deciding to evacuate on 4 April. Later, France also evacuated Crimea amidst the mutiny within its navy. France ultimately decided to change its strategy from direct intervention to Cordon Sanitaire – that is, to create a buffer zone of independent pro-Allied states to contain Soviet Russia, although France no longer would be directly involved in the confrontations. Poland would be the most important link in this scheme, which would also check on Germany's power in Central Europe.

In March 1919, Britain too decided to withdraw before the winter its expeditionary forces from various theaters of the Russian Civil War, such as North Russia, and also from the Caucasus. However, Churchill managed to make the Cabinet increase support for Denikin and Kolchak in south Russia amidst their advance in Ukraine, increasing the size of the military mission and creating various British liaison groups attached to White Russian armies to train them on the use of British arms.

== Sources ==
- Kopisto, Lauri (2011). The British Intervention in South Russia 1918-1920. Helsinki: University of Helsinki. ISBN 9789521069239.
- Kettle, Michael (1981). The Allies and the Russian Collapse, March 1917-March 1918. University of Minnesota Press. ISBN 9780816609819.
- Sellen, Robert W. (1960). "The British Intervention in Russia, 1917-1920: I". Dalhousie Review. 40: 360–371.
