= No. 266 Squadron RAF =

Defunct flying squadron of the Royal Air Force

No. 266 (Rhodesia) Squadron RAF
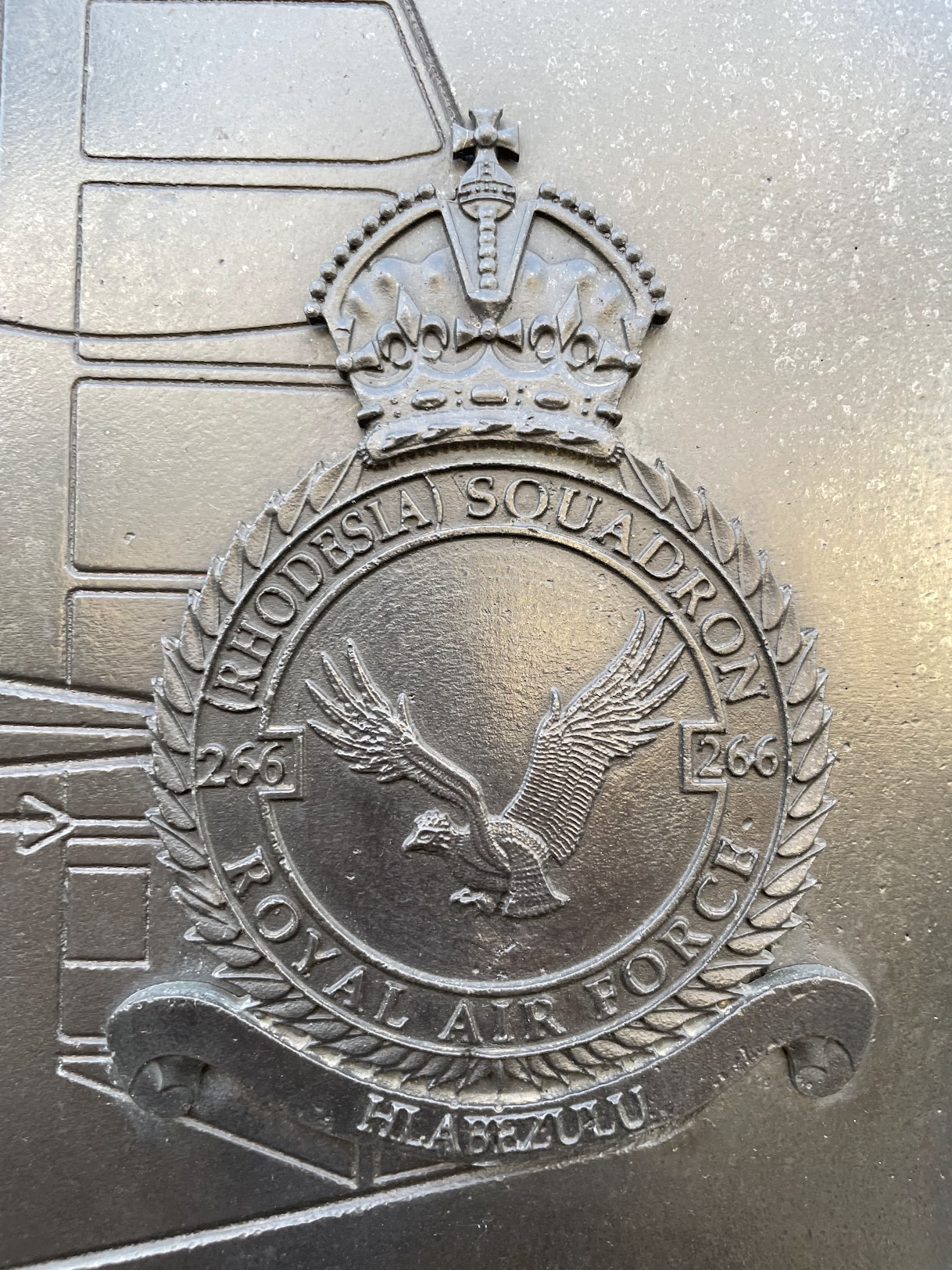
- The squadron's heraldic badge as it appears on the Battle of Britain Monument in London.
- Active: 27 September 1918 – 1 September 1919; 30 October 1939 – 31 July 1945; 1 September 1946 – 11 February 1949; 14 July 1952 – 16 November 1957; 1 December 1959 – 30 June 1964.
- Country: United Kingdom
- Allegiance: Rhodesia
- Branch: Royal Air Force
- Nickname: Rhodesia
- Mottos: Northern Ndebele: Hlabezulu ("The stabber of the sky")

Insignia
- Squadron Badge: A bateleur eagle volant
- Squadron Codes: UO (Jan 1940 – Jul 1942); ZH (Jul 1942 – Jul 1945); FX (Sep 1946 – Feb 1949); L (Jul 1952 – 1953); A (1953–1955 )

No. 266 (Rhodesia) Squadron RAF was a squadron of the Royal Air Force.

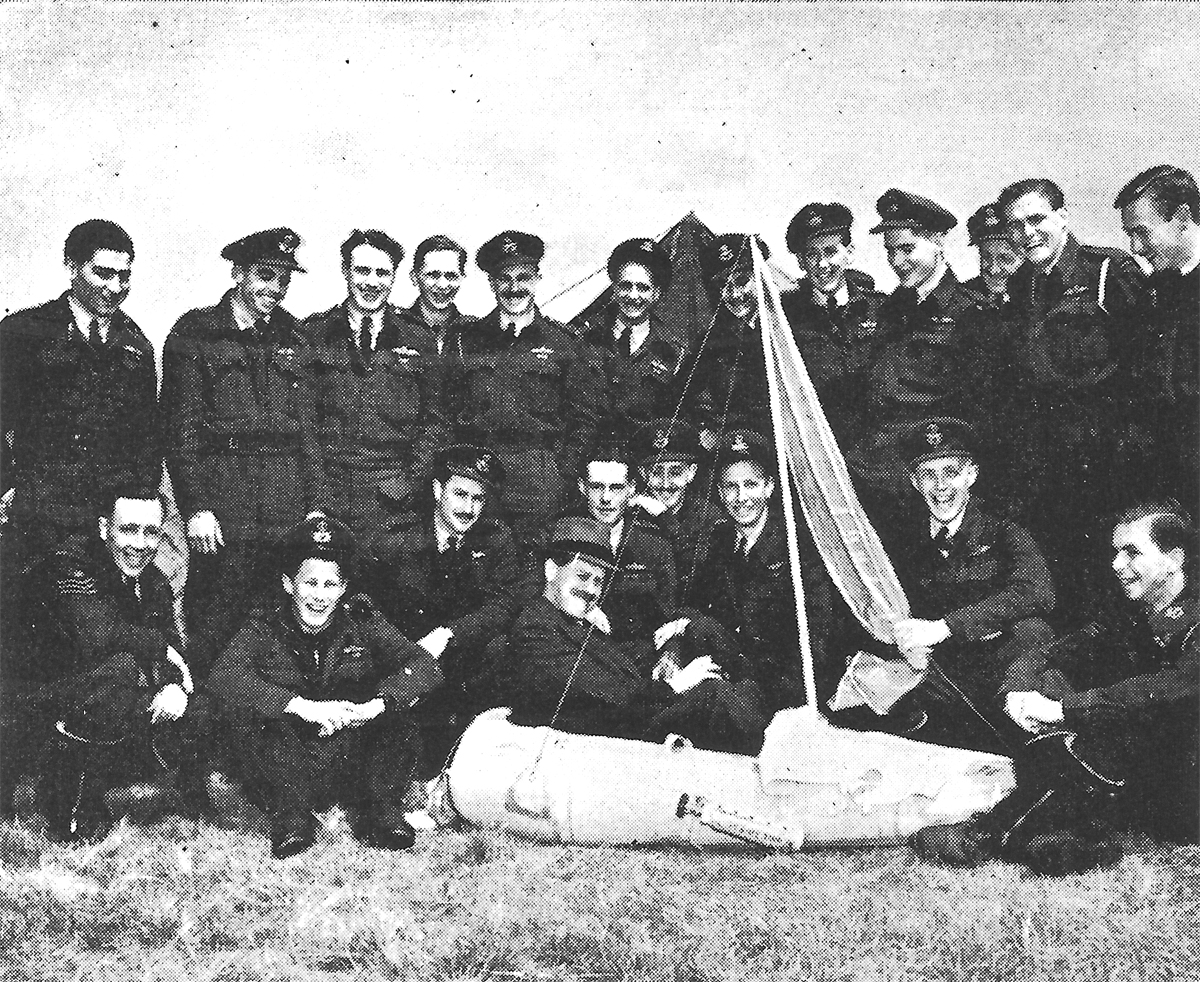
Godfrey Huggins, the Prime Minister of Southern Rhodesia, visits No. 266 (Rhodesia) Squadron RAF in May 1944. The PM sits in a dinghy, surrounded by men of the unit.

== History ==
=== First World War & Russian Civil War ===
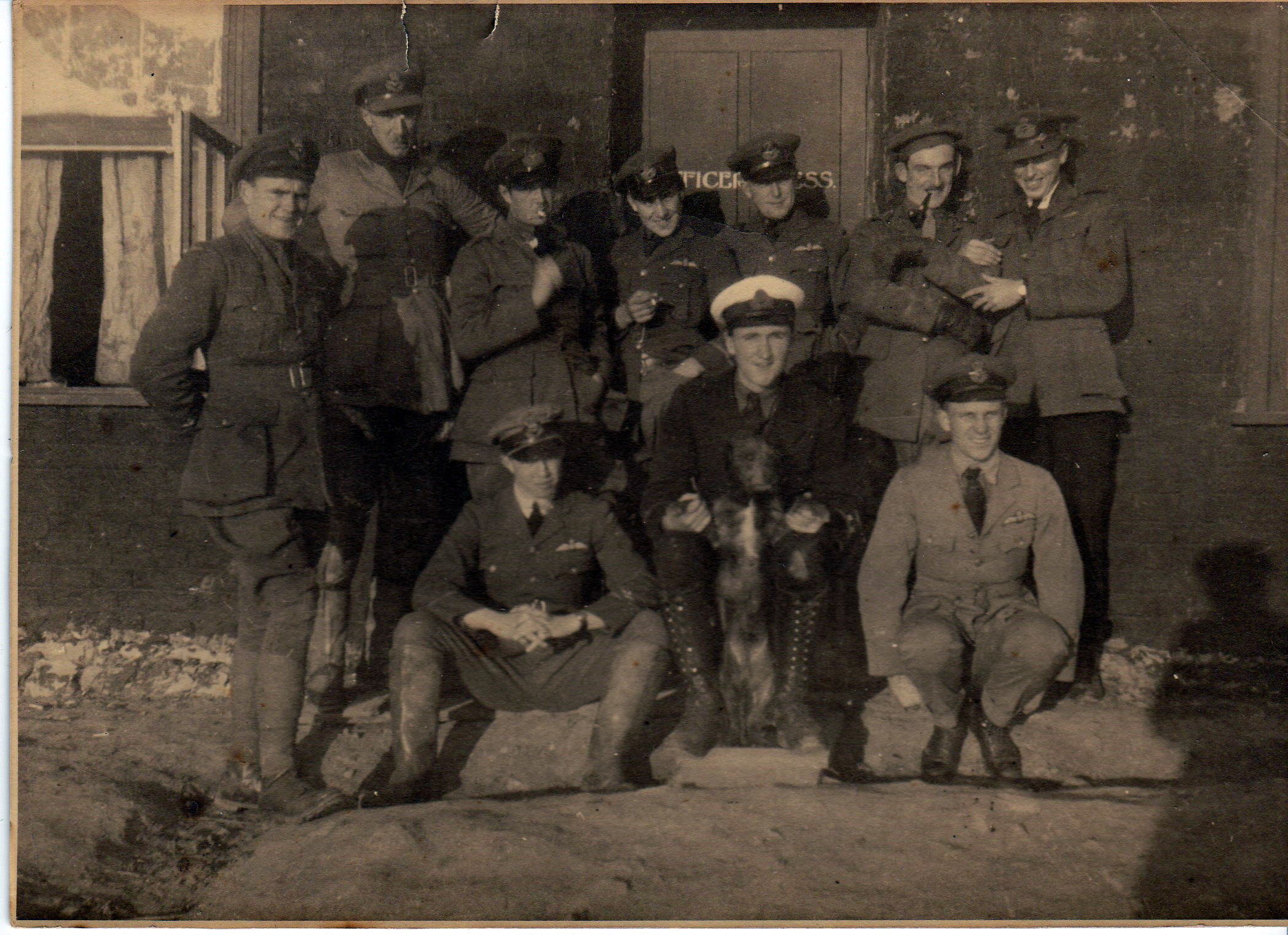
RFC Flight Group Shot 1918 Mudros

The squadron was formed from RFC / RAF Nos 437 and 438 Flights at Mudros, Greece on 27 September 1918 to carry out anti-submarine patrols in that area, flying Short 184s and 320s along with Felixstowe F.3s. In February 1919 it was transferred to the Caucasus on HMS Engadine. It operated from Petrovsk and from HMS Aladar Youssanoff and HMS Orlionoch as part of the British Caspian Flotilla. It was withdrawn on 27 August 1919 and disbanded on 1 September 1919 at Novorossisk.

=== Second World War ===
The squadron was reformed on 30 October 1939 at RAF Sutton Bridge as a fighter squadron, one of the Rhodesian gift squadrons and was named 266 (Rhodesia) Squadron in honour of the gift. Originally it was equipped with the Fairey Battle light bomber but soon after in January 1940 it received the Supermarine Spitfire and became a fighter squadron. It was in action over Dunkirk in early June and fought in the Battle of Britain. To rest the squadron it was moved north to RAF Wittering to carry out patrols over France.

During October 1941, the Squadron moved the short distance from Wittering to the nearby RAF Kings Cliffe. Here the Squadron engaged in the vital task of escorting convoys travelling up and down the east coast of England.

In late January 1942 the squadron moved to RAF Duxford and re-equipped with the Hawker Typhoon. The squadron changed role to fighter-bomber in support of the Normandy invasion and flew also armed reconnaissance missions in support of the invasion forces. The squadron moved along with the armies and was disbanded at Hildesheim, Germany on 31 July 1945.

In May 1944 the squadron was based at Needs Oar (Needs Ore) Advanced Landing Ground at Beaulieu in the New Forest, they were one of four such RAF British and Commonwealth squadrons flying Hawker Typhoons based here in the build-up to D-Day. About 150 aircraft were based here in the build-up to D-Day, along with over 900 ground crew. During the spring and summer of 1944, it is estimated that the airfield was so busy that aircraft took off or landed every 45 seconds. As with many of the ALGs along the south coast, the airfield was vacant by July and would not be used as an airfield again. No. 266 Squadron were visited by the Rhodesian Prime Minister on 18 May 1944.

On 27 August 1944 the squadron and No. 263 Squadron RAF Typhoons with Spitfire escort was mistakenly ordered to attack the Royal Navy 1st Minesweeping Flotilla off Cap d'Antifer, Le Havre, with the result that HMS Britomart and Hussar were sunk and Salamander was irreparably damaged, killing 117 sailors and wounding 153 more.

=== Into the jet age ===
The squadron re-formed at RAF Boxted on 1 September 1946 when 234 Squadron was renumbered. It was now a fighter squadron operating the Meteor F.3 twin-jet fighter. After a move to RAF Tangmere, Sussex two years, later the squadron converted to Meteor F.4s. The squadron was disbanded when it was re-numbered to 43 Squadron on 11 February 1949. On 14 July 1952 the squadron was reformed at Wunstorf, flying the de Havilland Vampire and later the de Havilland Venom for ground attack & night battle operations. The squadron moved on 16 October 1955 to RAF Fassberg, West Germany for a year before going back again to Wunstorf, where it was disbanded on 16 November 1957.

=== Bloodhound missiles ===
The last time the squadron reformed was on 1 December 1959 at Rattlesden to operate the Bristol Bloodhound anti-aircraft missile until it was finally disbanded on 30 June 1964.

== Aircraft and missiles operated ==
From	To	Aircraft	Version
Aug 1918	Sep 1919	Short 184	
Aug 1918	Sep 1919	Short 320	
Aug 1918	Sep 1919	Felixstowe F.3	
Dec 1939	Apr 1940	Fairey Battle	Mk.I
Jan 1940	Sep 1940	Supermarine Spitfire	Mk.I
Sep 1940	Oct 1940	Supermarine Spitfire	Mk.IIa
Oct 1940	Apr 1941	Supermarine Spitfire	Mk.I
Mar 1941	Sep 1941	Supermarine Spitfire	Mk.IIa
Sep 1941	May 1942	Supermarine Spitfire	Mk.Vb
Jan 1942	Jul 1945	Hawker Typhoon	Ia, Ib
Sep 1946	Apr 1948	Gloster Meteor	F.3
Feb 1948	Feb 1949	Gloster Meteor	F.4
Jul 1952	Jun 1954	de Havilland Vampire	FB.5, FB.9
Apr 1953	Sep 1955	de Havilland Venom	NF.3
Jul 1955	Nov 1957	de Havilland Venom	FB.4
Dec 1959	Jun 1964	Bristol Bloodhound	I

== In fiction ==
266 Squadron RFC is the squadron in which Captain James Bigglesworth serves in the Biggles stories that are set in the First World War.

== See also ==
- List of Royal Air Force aircraft squadrons
