= HMS Orlionoch =

1888 seaplane tender

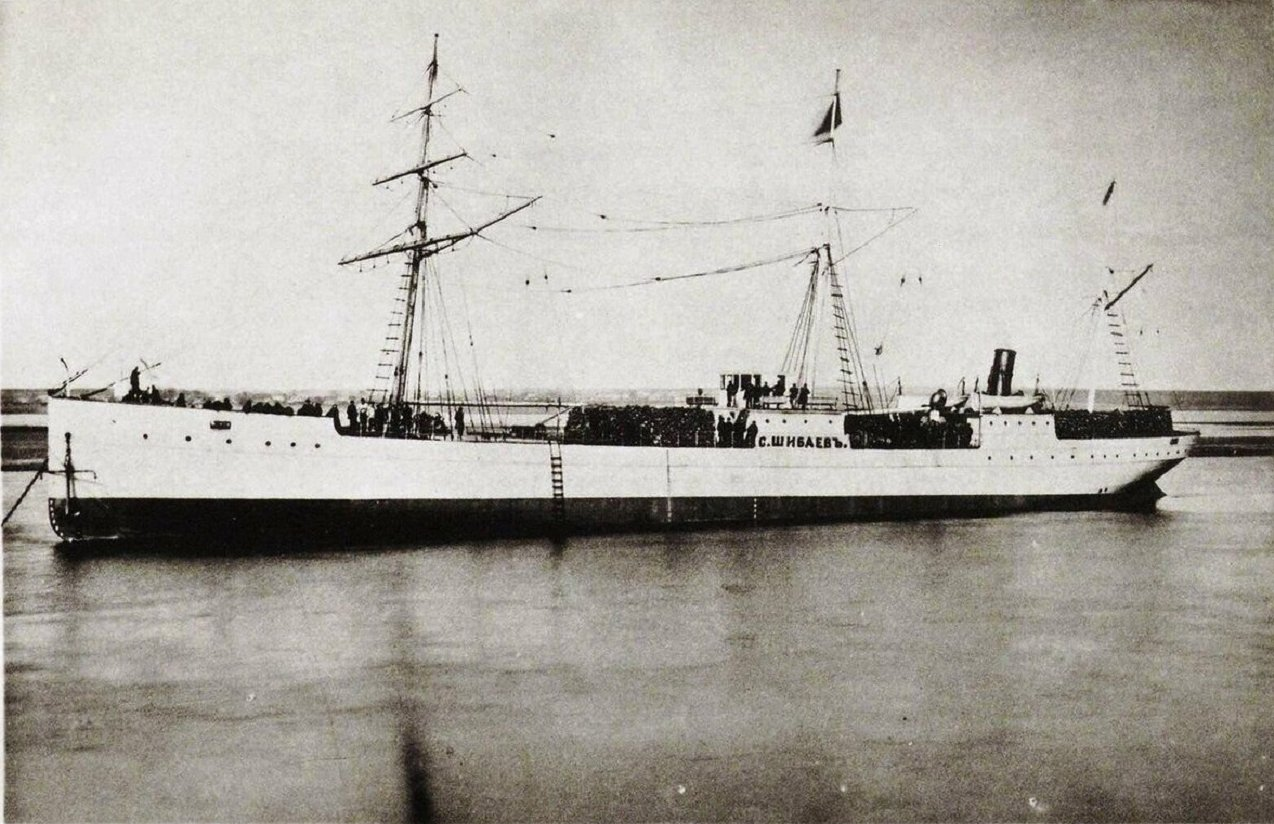
- Sidor Shibaev (later HMS Orlionoch) in 1903

History

Russian Empire
- Name: Sidor Shibaev
- Owner: Dadashov Brothers
- Port of registry: Baku
- Builder: Kolomna Locomotive Works
- Launched: 1888

History

Centrocaspian Dictatorship
- Name: Orlenok
- Fate: Requisitioned by the Royal Navy late 1918 or early 1919

United Kingdom
- Name: Orlionoch
- Fate: Transferred to White army control in August 1919

Caspian Flotilla of the White Movement
- Name: Orlenok

USSR
- Name: Orlenok
- Fate: Exploded on 24 October 1943 at 21:30, Krosnovodsk

General characteristics
- Class & type: Seaplane carrier
- Tonnage: 1,356.15 NRT
- Displacement: 1,406 long tons (1,429 t)
- Length: 250 ft 00 in (76.20 m)
- Beam: 35 ft 00 in (10.67 m)
- Draught: 18 ft 50 in (6.76 m)
- Speed: 12.5 mph (20.1 km/h)
- Aircraft carried: 2 Short Type 184

HMS Orlionoch was a Russian tanker which was seized by the British Royal Navy and used as seaplane tender in 1919 alongside HMS Aladar Youssanoff.

== History ==
She was originally known as the Sidor Shibaev, named after Sidor Shibaev – a pioneer of oil industry from an established Old Believer family. It was owned by L.F. Richter, a retired captain of artillery in Astrakhan by 1896. A share of it was later acquired by Azerbaijani merchant Alakbar Dadashov by 1899. By 1913, it was fully owned by Dadashov brothers – Alasgar and Alakbar Dadashovs. After Russian Civil War it was apparently seized by the Centro-Caspian Flotilla, the naval force of the Centro-Caspian Dictatorship and renamed Orlenok (Russian: Орленок, lit. 'Little Eagle'). In March 1919, the British were concerned about Bolshevik sympathies amongst the sailors of this flotilla, and disbanded it, integrating many of the ships into the British Caspian Flotilla. The Orlenok was redubbed HMS Orlionoch and added to their force, providing a tender for No. 266 Squadron RAF. The Flotilla was disbanded in August 1919 British and HMS Orlionoch was transferred with the 266 Squadron aeroplanes to the Caspian Flotilla of the White Movement. She was renamed the Orlenok and continued to be used by them until late 1919.

It was seized by Soviet Navy later in 1920 when a Soviet flotilla took over the Persian port of Anzali, and became part of its Caspian Flotilla as a cargo ship. The ship met its end on 24 October 1943 at 21:30 on port of Krasnovodsk when it stood at the berth of the port at the stern of the motor ship Osetin was unloading cans of gunpowder (280 tons) into wagons. As a result of the fire and explosion of gunpowder and the collision with Osetin, the ship's hull was broken and deformed, the deck mechanisms and engine were destroyed, the masts were burnt, and all the holds were filled with water. Three people were killed and seven people were injured as result of the incident.
