= Caucasus and Mercury =

Historical Russian shipping company

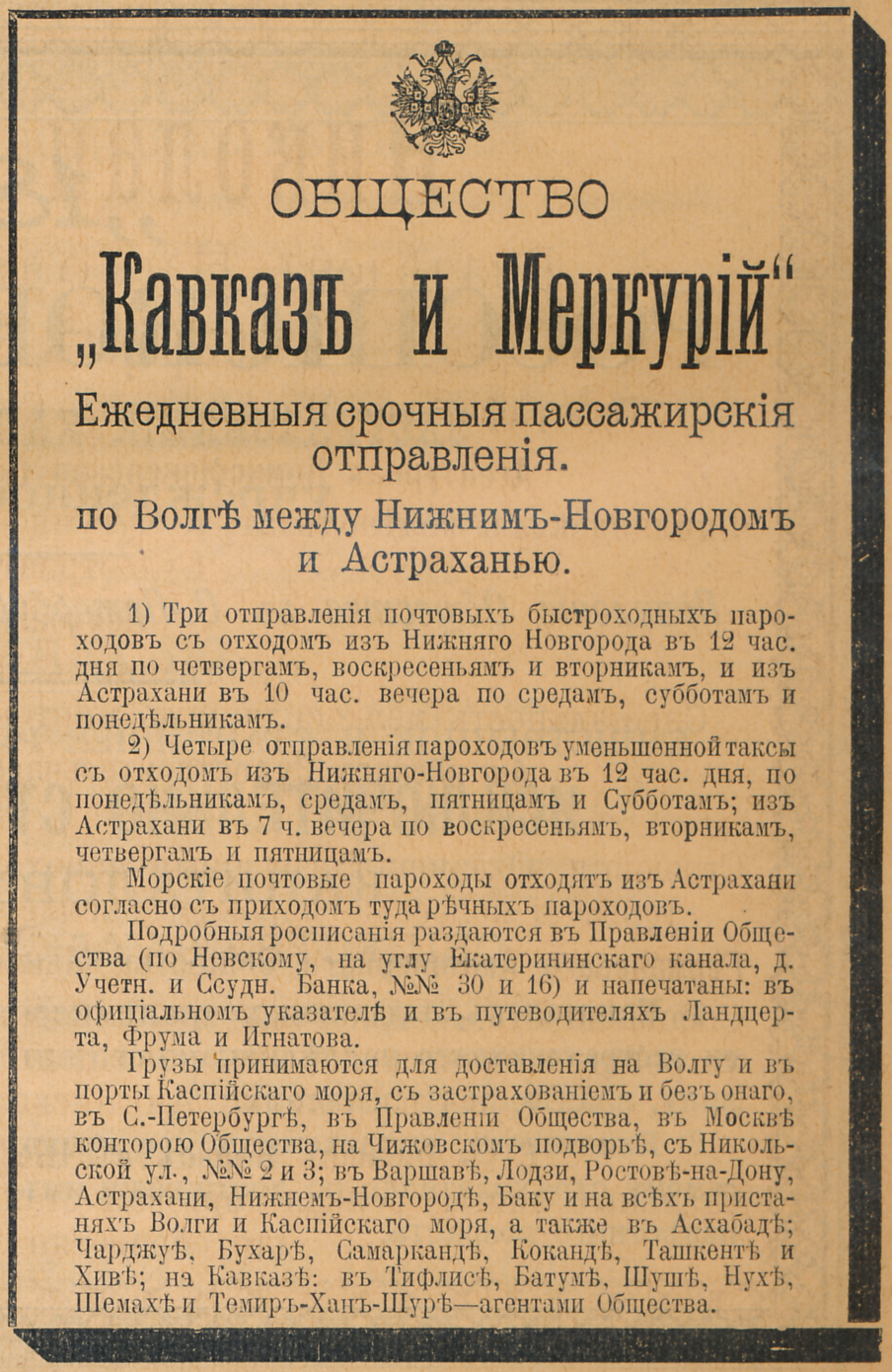
- An advertisement of the company, 1899
- Company type: Partnership
- Industry: Transportation
- Predecessor: Mercury (1849); Caucasus (1858)
- Founded: 21 May [O.S. 2 June] 1858
- Defunct: 1918
- Fate: Nationalization by Soviet Union
- Headquarters: Baku, Russian Empire
- Key people: Mikhail Botkin
- Services: Shipping

Caucasus and Mercury (or CMSC; Russian: Кавказъ и Меркурій, also known as К. и М.) was one of the three largest Russian pre-revolutionary shipping companies on the Volga.

== History ==
The company Mercury (Russian: Меркурій) was founded by privy councillors Valery Skripitsyn, Aleksey Lobkov and Nikolai Zherebtsov on 21 April [O.S. 9 April] 1849 with 750,000 roubles. In 1858 the board of Mercury founded the "Caucasus" (Russian: Кавказъ) shipping company for navigation in the Caspian Sea, but in the same year both shipping companies were merged into one under the general title "Caucasus and Mercury", on 21 May [O.S. 2 June] 1858. Its first chairman of board was Alexander Zhandr.

It established a mechanical plant in 1866, Baku. In early 1860s company was already operating 15 steamships and 7 propeller schooners on the Caspian Sea. Company moved headquarters to Baku in 1867. Company later established first electric-grid system of Baku for passenger terminal. In 1896, the company won the All-Russia Exhibition 1896, which gave it the right to place the Russian state emblem on ships. It was granted a monopoly over transport of mail, military personnel, and military cargo and defense equipment, as well as annual subsidy of 350,000 rubles by the government. Nikolai Alennikov joined the company's board of directors. The St. Petersburg International Commercial Bank later bought a controlling stake in "Caucasus and Mercury" towards 20th century. As a result, the company "Caucasus and Mercury" turned from a large Volga-Caspian Shipping Company into a powerful trust that had the financial support of one of the leading banks in Russia.

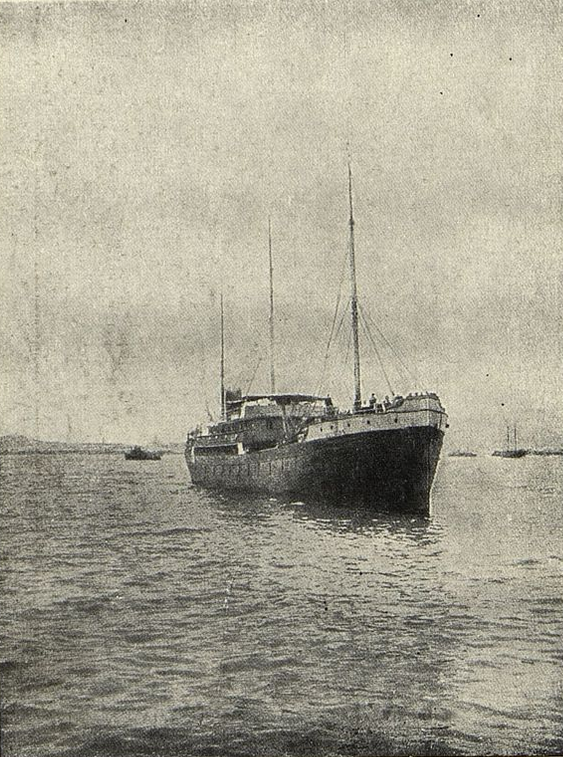
President Kruger, 1914

After Zhandr's resignation in March 1893, Mikhail Botkin held chairmanship of the board of the company until his death in 1914. Botkin also purchased several private and joint-stock shipping companies. In 1911, part of the naval fleet of the Nadezhda shipping company was acquired and in the same year the relatively independent Kura Flotilla (to navigate in Kura river) was organized as part of the Caspian Shipping Company. It also established two nautical schools – one in Baku and other in Astrakhan.

In 1913, to expand passenger traffic in the Middle Volga, the private shipping company of Maria Kashina was acquired. At Botkin's suggestion, the company's river fleet was equipped with a whole series of 11 comfortable passenger ships of the Borodino-class. Company's operations later spread to Qajar Iran as well, opened agencies in Tehran, Mashhad, Rasht and Qazvin in 1901. Earlier in 1887, the shallow-draft freight transport Tehran was built to communicate with the shallow Iranian port of Anzali. In 1903, the company acquired a controlling stake in the Persian Insurance and Transport Company.

The early 1910s also saw the merger of Caucasus and Mercury with the Eastern Society of Commodity Warehouses (Russian: Восточное общество товарных складов) and the acquisition of the Kura-Caspian Shipping Company. The company was nationalized in March 1918. By this time, its fleet consisted of 44 river and 18 sea steamers. It was transformed into Soviet Caspian Shipping Company on 1 October 1923 on the orders of Nariman Narimanov, which was later developed to Azerbaijan Caspian Shipping Company.

== Design ==
The hulls of the river steamers "Caucasus and Mercury" were painted white, the pipes – black; seagoing vessels had their hulls painted black and their superstructures white.

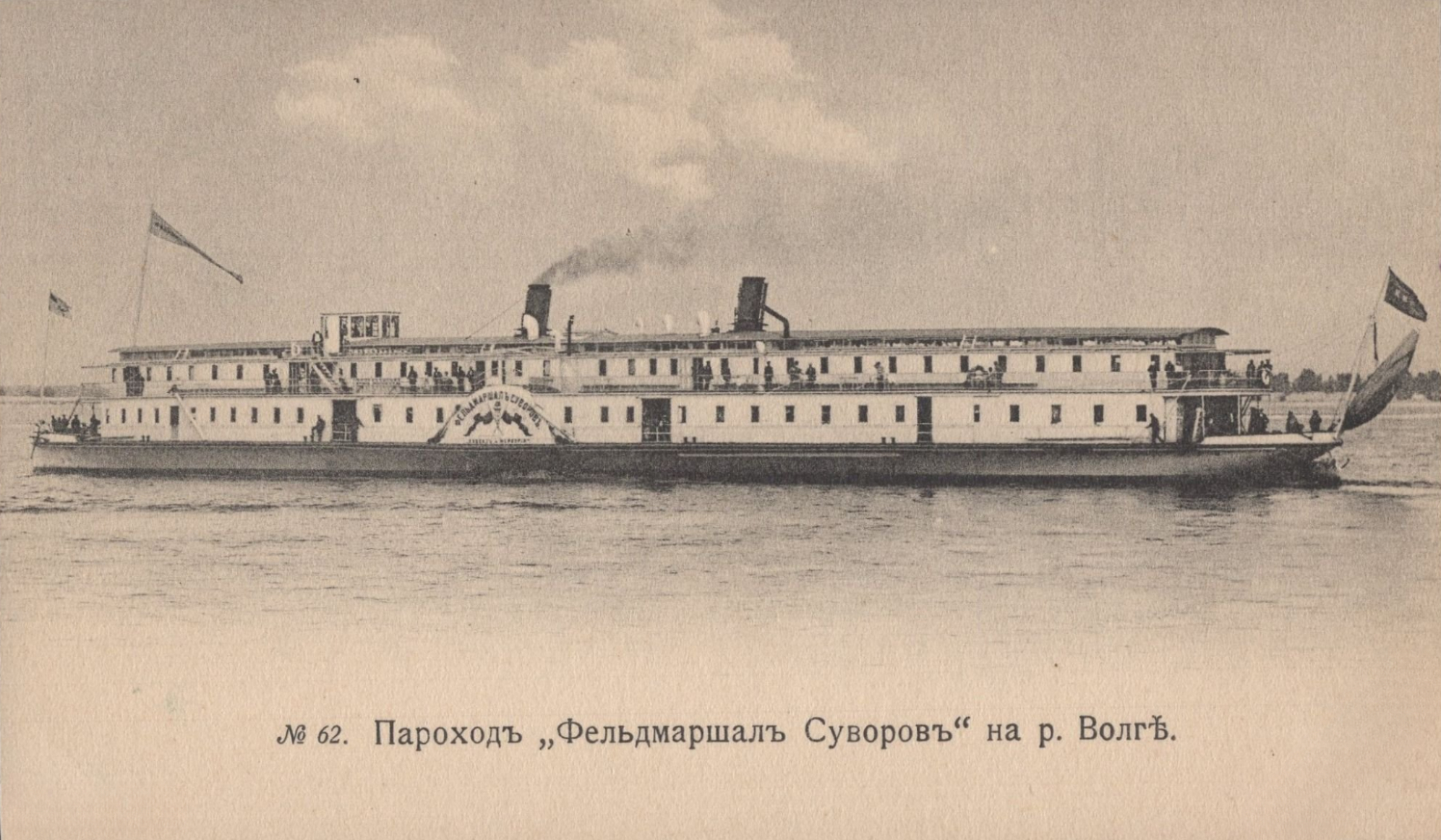
Caucasus and Mercury steamship Fieldmarshar Suvorov cruising on Volga

== Fleet ==
Having merged in 1858 from two shipping companies, the company developed not only cargo, but also passenger transportation: in 1870, passenger steamships Emperor Alexander II, Empress Catherine II, Peter the Great, Dmitry Donskoy and Alexander Nevsky began sailing along the Volga. From the 1880s, the company began building luxury steamships that were specifically designed for river cruises, with electric lighting and restaurants. The quality of these ships was confirmed by the right to depict the Russian state emblem on them. The cruises covered the entire navigable Volga and part of the Caspian Sea. In 1914, the shipping company owned 76 ships, as well as docks and marinas, becoming the largest shipping company in the Russian Empire. One of its vessel's President Kruger was later seized by Royal Navy and converted to HMS Krüger.
