= HMS Kruger =

Flag ship of the British Caspian Flotilla during the Russian Civil War

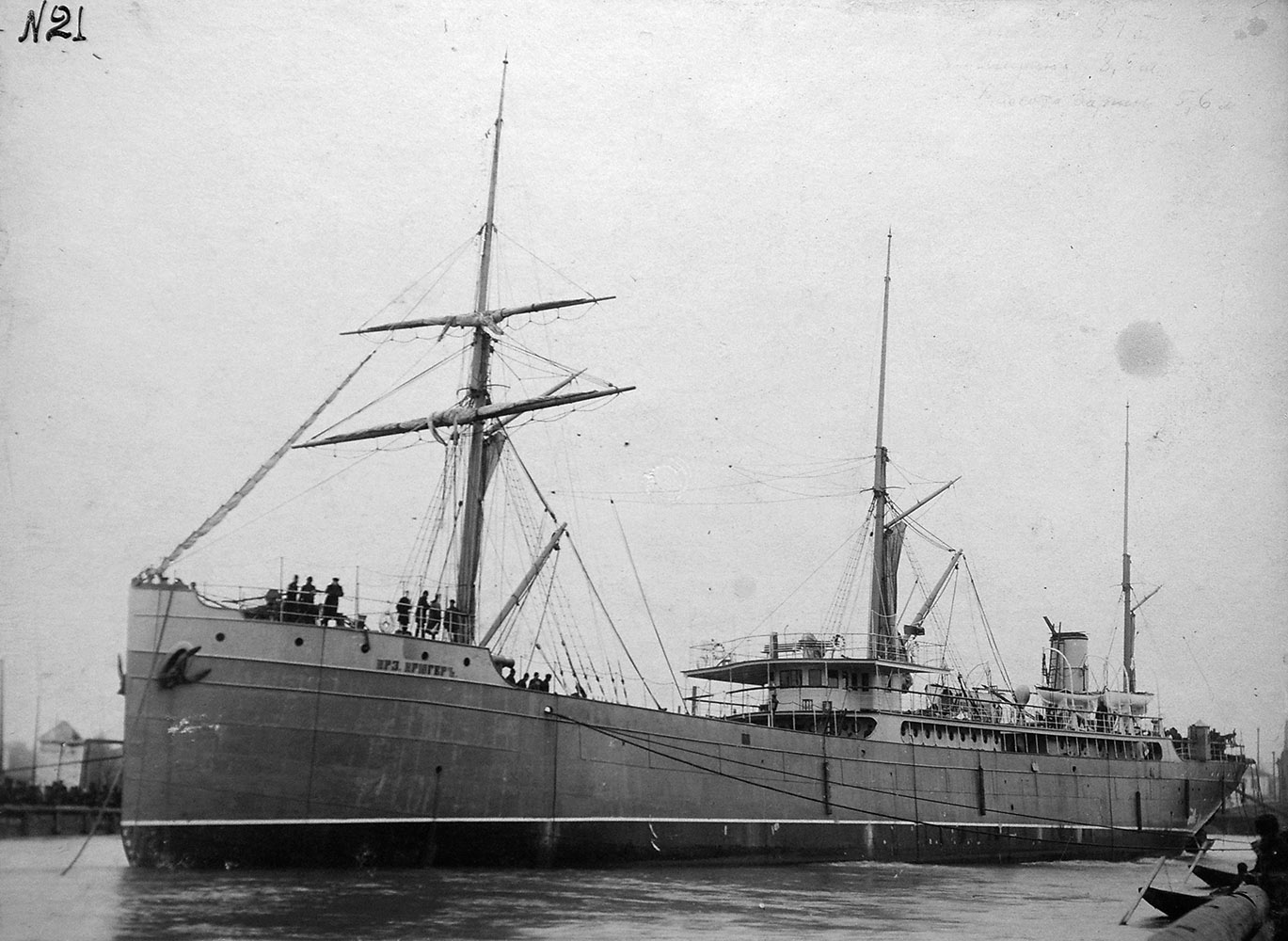
- President Kruger, 1902 in Votka river

History

Russian Empire
- Name: President Kruger
- Namesake: Paul Kruger
- Operator: Caucasus and Mercury
- Builder: Votskinsk Factory
- Laid down: 1901
- Launched: April 1902

United Kingdom
- Name: HMS Kruger
- Acquired: 1918

USSR
- Name: Fedya Gubanov
- Acquired: 1920
- Out of service: 1950s

General characteristics
- Class & type: Screw steamer
- Length: 87.20 m (286 ft 1 in)
- Beam: 10.24 m (33 ft 7 in)
- Draft: 5.79 m (19 ft 0 in)
- Installed power: 275 hp (205 kW)
- Speed: 10.79 knots (20.0 km/h; 12.4 mph)
- Complement: 690 passenger, 28 crew
- Armament: 4 field guns (in 1918)

HMS Kruger was the flagship of the British Caspian Flotilla during the Russian Civil War. It was originally a screw steamer with steel hull named President Kruger (Russian: Президент Крюгер) and used for oil cargo with limited facilities to accommodate passengers. It belonged to Caucasus and Mercury Partnership with home port of Baku. It was seized by David Norris on 14 August 1918 along other boats of Caspian basin. According to Lionel Dunsterville, Kruger was "a fine ship and as fast as anything on the Caspian, with the exception of the gunboats, and she had accommodation sufficient for my staff, the clerks, and the office, as well as about 300 men normally; at a pinch she could carry 800 men by utilizing all deck space."

The initial armament consisted of four field guns (probably 102 mm 60 caliber Pattern 1911) placed on the forward cargo hatch, and attached to bales of cotton. However, they were later removed to be used during Battle of Baku.

The ship was commanded by a Russian captain. It participated in the victorious Battle of Alexandrovsky Fort on 21 May 1919 against Russian Bolshevik forces. It was handed over to Denikin on 2 September 1919. Following the defeat of White Russians and subsequent Sovietization of Azerbaijan, President Kruger was seized by the Bolsheviks after them captured the White naval base at Bandar e Anzali, at the time guarded by the British North Persian Force. Once again renamed to Fedya Gubanov under orders of Nariman Narimanov on 10 June 1920 after a Bolshevik sailor who illegally transported oil products to Astrakhan during Russian Civil War.

== Bibliography ==
- Dunsterville, L. C. (1920). The Adventures of Dunsterforce. London: Edward Arnold. OCLC 317431 – via Archive Foundation.
- Osborne, Richard; Spong, Harry; Grover, Tom (2007). Armed Merchant Cruisers 1878–1945. Windsor, UK: World Warship Society. ISBN 978-0-9543310-8-5.
