= HMS Aladar Youssanoff =

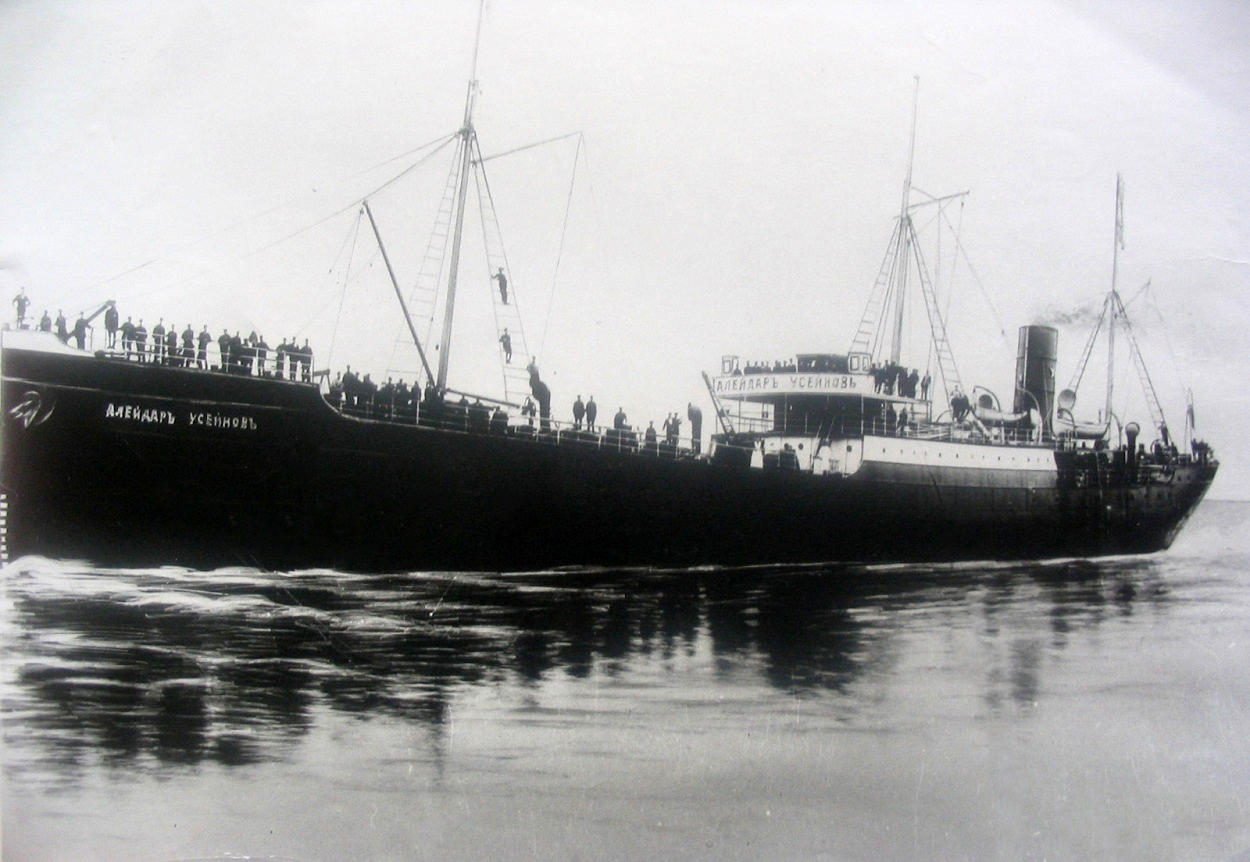
- HMS Aladar Youssanoff before 1905

History

Russian Empire
- Name: Aleydar Useynov
- Namesake: Aliheydar Huseynov
- Port of registry: Baku
- Builder: Sormovo Machine Works
- Launched: 1905

United Kingdom
- Name: HMS Aladar Youssanoff
- Acquired: January 1919
- Stricken: August 1919

Caspian Flotilla of the White Movement
- Name: Volga (October 1919)
- Acquired: August 1919

USSR
- Name: Alyosha Japaridze
- Acquired: 18 May 1920
- Fate: scrapped in 1950s

General characteristics
- Class & type: Seaplane carrier
- Displacement: 2,070.68 long tons (2,103.91 t)
- Length: 303 ft 82 in (94.44 m)
- Beam: 36 ft 44 in (12.09 m)
- Draft: 21 ft 00 in (6.40 m)
- Armament: 1 QF 12-pounder 18 cwt naval gun; 2 Short Type 184

HMS Aladar Youssanoff (Note: Also known as Aladir Useynov or Yusanoff) was a Russian cargo-tanking steel steamship for the transportation of dry cargo, as well as oil and kerosene in bulk which was seized by the British Royal Navy and used as seaplane tender in 1919 alongside HMS Orlionoch.

== History ==
Originally named Aleydar Useynov (Russian: Алейдаръ Усейновъ), it belonged to Mammad Baghir Huseynov, an Azerbaijani merchant and oil baron from Baku who named it after his youngest son Aliheydar Huseynov. Build by Sormovo Machine Works in 1905, Nizhny Novgorod it was a private oil tanker until 1918.

=== Russian Civil War ===
During the Russian Civil War, it was seized by No. 266 Squadron RAF in 1919 who placed 2 Short Type 184 on its board and converted to seaplane carrier. Becoming a part of British Caspian Flotilla, it participated in the Battle of Alexandrovsky Fort in May 1919 against a Bolshevik flotilla. It soon encountered technical problems and constant sabotage by Russian mariners, therefore it was decided to transfer planes to HMS Orlionoch for further operations. The ship along with seaplanes, was also transferred to the Denikin Army in August 1919, who in October 1919 gave it a new name Volga.

=== USSR ===
After the Soviet invasion of Azerbaijan, it was seized by Bolshevik forces on 18 May 1920 near Enzeli and was renamed Alyosha Japaridze after Prokofy Dzhaparidze, a member of 26 Baku Commissars. On 26 May 1935 steamer Japaridze unsuccessfully participated in rescue operation of tanker Soviet Azerbaijan (Russian: Советский Азербайджан), which exploded during the run Krasnovodsk-Astrakhan with 27 men being lost while ship sunk. Which caused a huge legal process involving Procurator General of the Soviet Union Andrey Vyshinsky.

During World War II, it was given callsign UNSL. It towed lighter No.3032 from Baku to Astrakhan in July 1943, and lighter sank during the storm while all crewmembers were saved by Japaridze. It was used up until 1950s by Soviet Caspian Flotilla.
