= George Milner (British Army officer) =

British Army general

General George Milner (1760–1836) was a general officer of the British Army during the late eighteenth century.

He was the son of Sir William Milner, 2nd Baronet. In 1776, he was appointed an ensign in the 3rd Foot Guards, purchasing his lieutenancy (nominal rank of captain) in 1778 and captaincy (nominal rank of lieutenant-colonel) in 1792. He served in Flanders through 1793 and 1794, being given the brevet rank of colonel in 1796 and appointed as a major-general in January 1801. From February 1800 to January 1802 he served on the staff in Jersey.

In May 1801 he was appointed major in the 3rd Guards, and lieutenant-colonel in January 1806, after which he retired. He was given the brevet rank of lieutenant-general in 1808, and full general in 1819.

George Milner and other members of the Milner family lived at Mickleham, Surrey. He died in 1836.
