= Petrovsk air base =

Airport in Saratov Oblast, Russia

Petrovsk
- Petrovsk, Saratov Oblast in Russia

Site information
- Type: Air Base
- Owner: Ministry of Defence
- Operator: Russian Air Force

Location
- Shown within Saratov Oblast Petrovsk (Russia)
- Coordinates: 52°16′25″N 45°23′20″E

Site history
- Built: 1960
- In use: 1960 - 1998

Airfield information
- Identifiers: ICAO: XWPP
- Elevation: 207 metres (679 ft) AMSL
Runways
Direction	Length and surface
14/32	2,000 metres (6,562 ft) Concrete

Petrovsk (also Petrovsk South) is a former air base in Russia located 3 km south of Petrovsk.

From 1960 to 1971 the 478th Training Aviation Regiment, initially flying Ilyushin Il-12s and Ilyushin Il-14s, was stationed at the Borisoglebsk. It moved in 1971 to Petrovsk. It was part of the Balashov Higher Military Aviation School of Pilots. It was reduced in size in 1994, and disbanded in 1998.

Since the disbandment of the 478th Training Aviation Regiment, the aerodrome has not been used.

== See also ==
- List of military airbases in Russia
