= No war, no peace =

Phrase referring to a politico-military situation

No war, no peace (alternatively, 'no peace, no war') is a phrase referring to a politico-military situation that is stable albeit marked by insecurity and low levels of violence that causes the persistence of a larger conflict. This situation is a deadlock, and is guided by stationary strategies, perpetual hostility and can involve a huge amount of manpower and resources. Proponents of no war no peace may prefer ceasefire as a conflict outcome, thus extending the duration and extent of the grey-zone.

== Prevalence ==
The 2000s have seen a number of countries (Cyprus, Ivory Coast, Moldova) and sovereign subdivisions (Assam, Abkhazia) in such an elongated state. Russia and the United States lingered in a situation of no war no peace for decades.

== Breaking/extending the deadlock ==
In a 'no war, no peace' situation, efforts towards peace following the war, usually following a peace accord, is of a compromised nature having characteristics resembling the war that preceded it. While there may be national level chest beating, at a localised level the "win" or "peace accord" may mean that at localised levels, communities have to unwillingly accept to things such as living with those who were once their enemy. To get out of a state of no war, no peace, the peace required must be "truly transformative" as in the case of Northern Ireland or Lebanon. Here, peace could refer to personal well-being, shared practices, order, stability, justice and absence of war. Peace that ends up fixing superficial wounds, tick marking a quantifiable checklist and that features human rights and democracy in the peace process in turn prolongs the no war no peace situation. For the situation to persist the groups involved must also be continuously "energized and re-energized by new sets of grievances".

== See also ==
- Grey-zone (international relations)
- Cold War
