= British Caspian Flotilla =

Naval force of the Royal Navy in the Caspian Sea in 1918

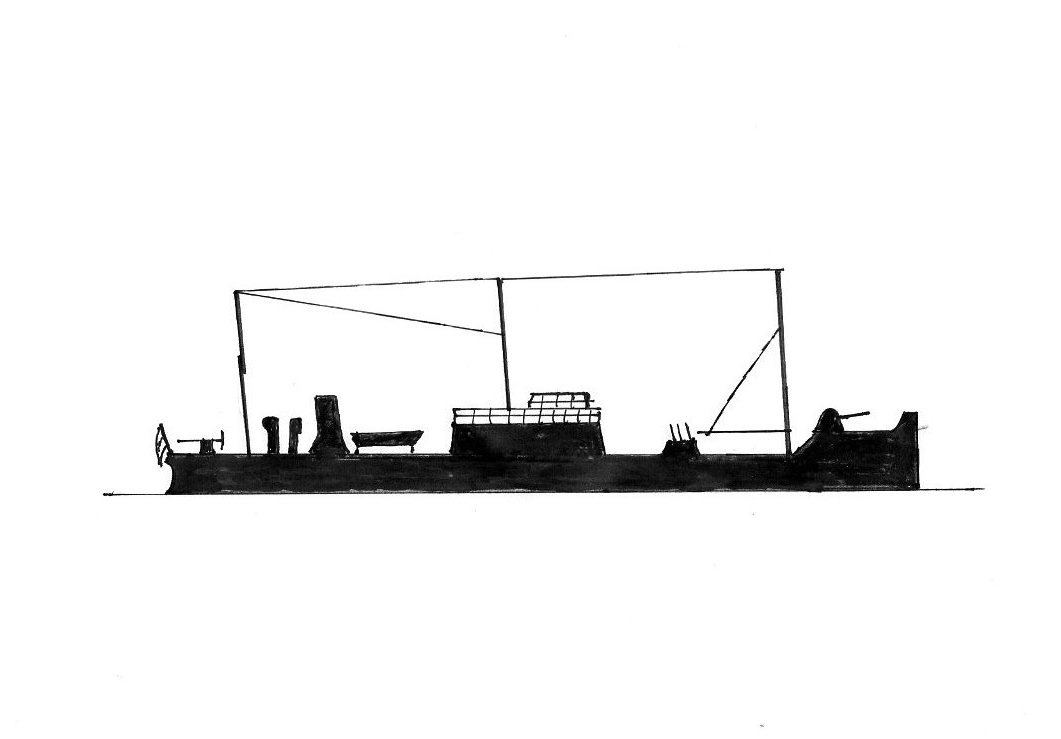
- HMS Kruger, flagship of the flotilla
- Active: 1918–1920
- Country: United Kingdom
- Branch: Royal Navy

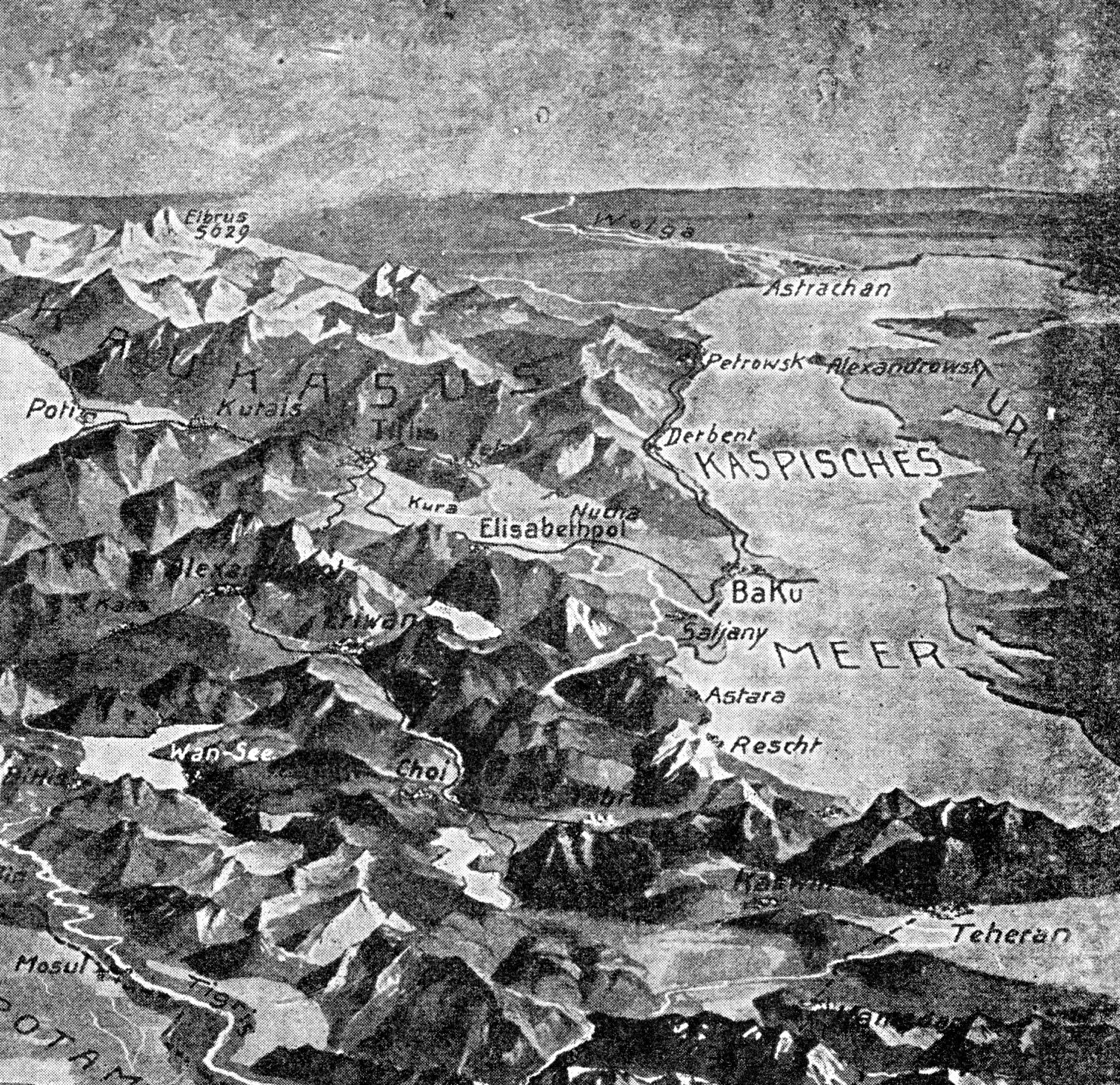
Caspian Sea and the Caucasus, 1915 (extract from the Birdseye View of Turkey and Baghdad Railway)

The British Caspian Flotilla was a naval force of the Royal Navy established in the Caspian Sea in 1918. It was part of the allied intervention in the Russian Civil War. The flotilla initially reported to the Rear-Admiral Commanding, Black Sea, Caspian Sea and Sea of Marmora until 1919.

== History ==
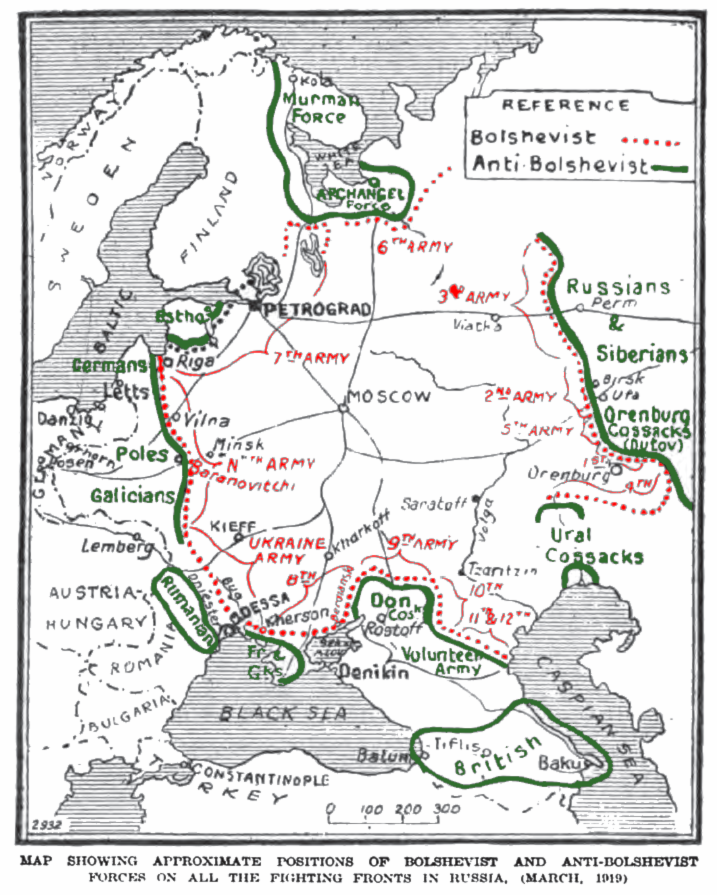

The decision to form the force was made on 11 July 1918 at the British military HQ in Baghdad. Its purpose was twofold:

1. To seize Krasnovodsk, the east coast terminal of the Trans-Caspian railway, and hence support the British Malleson Mission which was intervening in Turkmenistan.
2. To prevent Baku and the oilfields around it from falling onto the hands of the Germans or the Ottoman Empire.

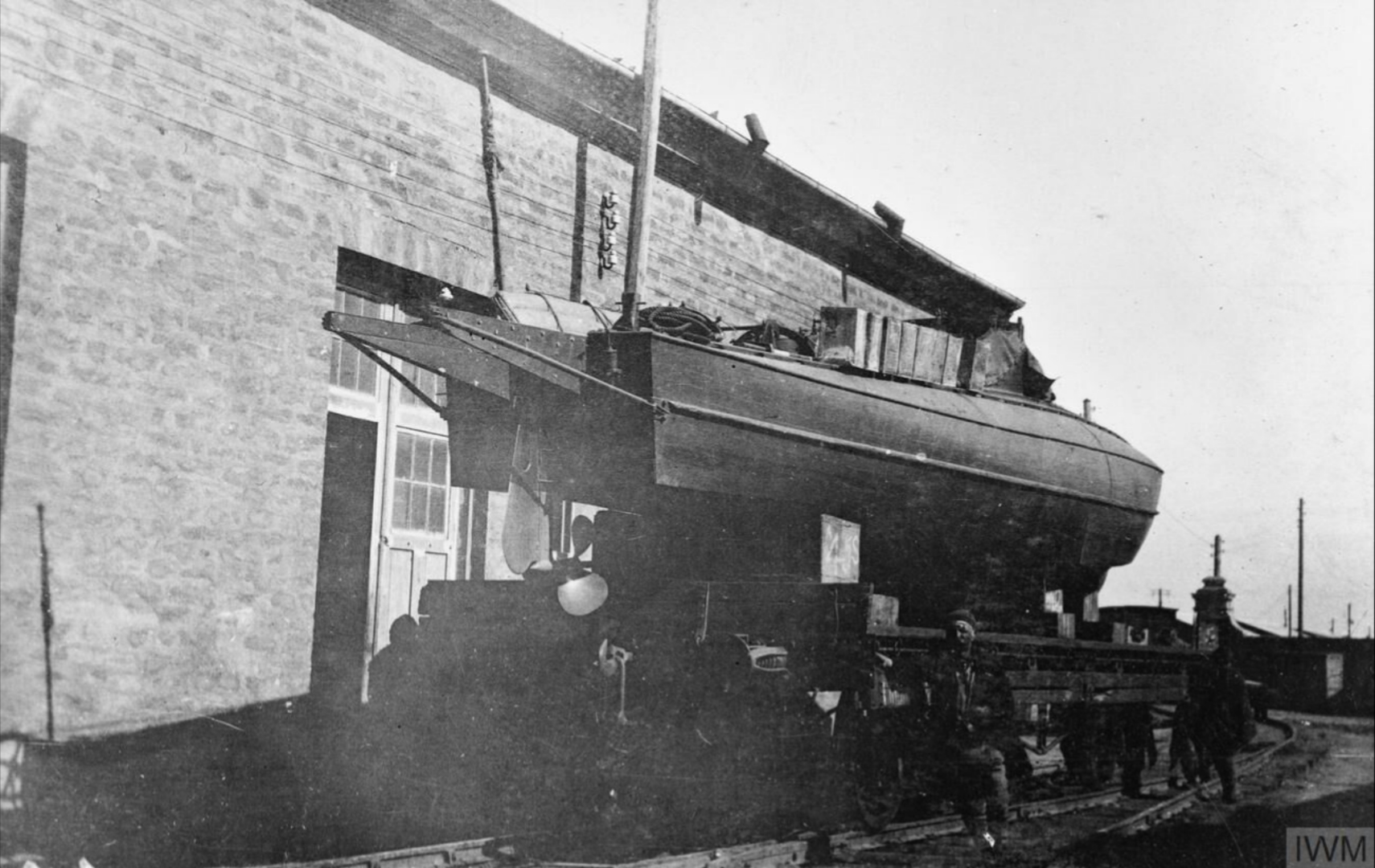
An HM CMB arrives by rail at Baku, July 1919

The force was established under the command of Commodore David Norris in September 1918. Norris traveled by road from Baghdad to Enzeli with a convoy of lorries transporting naval guns. In January 1919, he was reinforced by 12 Coastal Motor Boats (CMBs) sent by train from Batumi on the Black Sea. These ships were then armed with the naval guns, officered by British officers with a crew guarded by Royal Marines.

The flotilla maintained bases at Enzeli and Krasnovodsk, and in addition facilitated lines of communication between British land units in Baku, Petrovsk (Chechen Island), Fort Alexandrovsk.

The flotilla was successful in the Battle of Alexandrovsky Fort in May 1919 against a Bolshevik flotilla.

The Flotilla included:

- HMS Kruger (flagship)
- HMS Venture
- HMS Asia
- HMS Windsor Castle
- HMS Emile Nobel
- Seaplane tenders, which for a period hosted No. 266 Squadron RAF:
  - HMS Orlionoch
  - HMS Aladar Youssanoff
