= Caspian Flotilla of the White Movement =

The Caspian Flotilla of White Movement was a naval force of the White Movement during the Russian Civil War. It was also known as the Centro-Caspian Flotilla as it was at one stage under the command of the Centro-Caspian Dictatorship.

The fleet included two gunboats: two modern gunboats, Kars and Ardahan. These were seized on 31 July 1918. These ships were later captured in April 1920 and incorporated into the Soviet Caspian Flotilla.

== Background ==
The Imperial Russian Navy had established the Caspian Flotilla in 1722. Following the Treaty of Gulistan of 1813, this flotilla had been the only naval force on the Caspian Sea. From 1867 it had been based at Baku.
