= Sinking of ships of the Black Sea Fleet in Tsemes Bay =

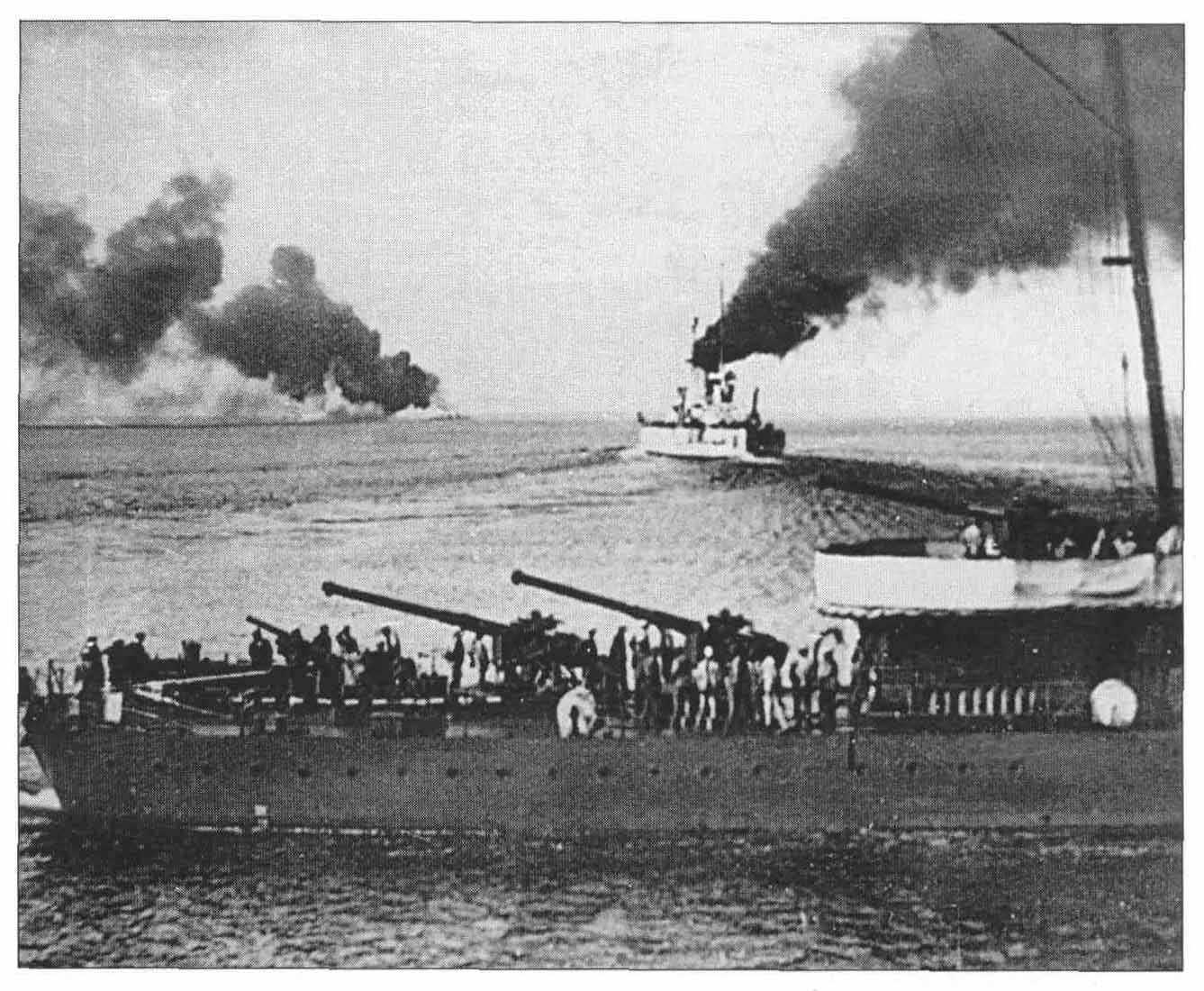
The battleship Volya leaves Novorossiysk on 17 June 1918. In the foreground is the destroyer Kerch, which was left to be sunk.

The Sinking of the Ships of the Black Sea Fleet in Tsemes Bay occurred on 18 June 1918 in Tsemes Bay, off the coast of the Black Sea near Novorossiysk. According to the Treaty of Brest-Litovsk, the Soviet Government was supposed to transfer its Black Sea Fleet to Germany, but it did not want to do this. Acting commander of the Black Sea Fleet, Captain 1st Rank Alexander Tikhmenev received an official order to bring the ships of the fleet from Novorossiysk to Sevastopol, where they would be handed over to German troops. He also received a secret order to scuttle them in Novorossiysk bay. Tikhmenev, after long deliberation and discussion with the naval committees, ordered all ships to go to Sevastopol. The crews of many ships refused to do this and scuttled them.

== Background ==
The Black Sea Fleet is not mentioned in the articles of the Treaty of Brest-Litovsk. However, in April 1918, after the coup and liquidation of the Central Rada of the Ukrainian People's Republic, the Germans invaded Crimea together with the troops of Hetman Pavlo Skoropadskyi, who proclaimed the "Ukrainian State", and himself – "Hetman of all Ukraine". This posed a clear threat to the fleet in Sevastopol. Vice-Admiral Mikhail Sablin was removed from command of the fleet, but when the Germans appeared near the city and the panic began, the crew committees of the battleships Volya and Svobodnaya Rossiya asked him to resume command. On 29 April, Sablin, who demanded expanded powers for himself, ordered the flags of the "Ukrainian State" to be raised on the ships, to prevent them being captured by the Germans. The crews of many destroyers refused to do this, and Sablin ordered them to leave the bay before the end of the day. Most of the destroyers left for Novorossiysk. Since the delegation on behalf of the "Ukrainian Fleet" was received by the Germans very coldly, and their troops appeared on the northern coast of the bay, on the evening of 30 April, Sablin ordered all the ships that remained underway, led by the battleships, to leave Sevastopol. While setting off, the destroyer Gnevny ran aground due to an error in the engine room and was unable to leave. During the exit from the bay Svobodnaya Rossiya was fired upon by the Germans from the guns installed on the shore and received minor damage. Rear Admiral Mikhail Ostrogradsky was instructed to prepare for the destruction of ships unable to make the voyage. Because of the panic in the port, only the destroyer Zavetny was destroyed.

== Events in Novorossiysk ==
On the morning of 1 May rebel destroyers arrived at Novorossiysk, and in the evening – a fleet with battleships. The city was formally under the control of the Kuban-Black Sea Soviet Republic, but law and order was disrupted by transports that had arrived earlier from other Black Sea ports, including those with Red Army soldiers. Order was restored when naval guards took control of the city. Sablin, who was supported by sailors from the battleships and was opposed in Sevastopol by the crews of most of the destroyers, demanded a general vote of the crews on his candidacy. The crews voted for his leadership. Sablin received a telegram from Field Marshal Hermann von Eichhorn from Kiev demanding that the ships be returned to Sevastopol, where they should be handed over to the Germans. German reconnaissance aircraft began to appear over Novorossiysk, and German submarines were sighted at sea. The city was anxiously awaiting the further advance of the Germans, who had already occupied Rostov-on-Don and Kerch. The Commander of the Army Alexei Ivanovich Avtonomov arrived in Novorossiysk, promising to mobilize 20,000 people for defense on land. Soon he was recalled to Moscow. Nikolai Glebov-Avilov, appointed commissar of the fleet, arrived in the city, but Sablin managed to minimize his influence. The ships did not have enough fuel for another sea voyage. Several trains of oil products were obtained from Tsaritsyn.

In early June, the navy sailor Ivan Vakhrameev arrived from the capital with a package of secret documents. In them, the naval headquarters described the prospects for the advance of the Germans to the fleet, and they ended with Leon Trotsky's resolution to immediately sink the ships. The resolution made a depressing impression on the command of the fleet. Sablin left for Moscow with the intentions to achieve the cancellation of the order and the restoration of supplies, leaving the commander of the Volya, Captain 1st Rank Alexander Tikhmenev, in command. On 8 June, Tikhmenev and other senior officers sent a telegram to the government asking them to withdraw the resolution and wait for further developments. On 10 June, the fleet received a number of telegrams from the government, including one encrypted. They said that during the Kiev negotiations, the Germans delivered an ultimatum to return the ships to Sevastopol before 19 June, otherwise they would continue their offensive deep into Russia. An open telegram ordered the fleet to be withdrawn to Sevastopol and surrendered to the Germans, while a coded one demanded that they be sunk. Tikhmenev revealed to the crews the contents of the telegrams and contrasting orders, and the next days passed in general discussion of the further fate of the ships. The rumor that the Germans were landing a 20,000–strong corps in Taman demoralized the fleet: desertion and continuous rallies began. A delegation from the Kuban–Black Sea Republic arrived, asking to unite and not to carry out the orders of the capital. The delegation promised to discuss the issue of allocating ground units for the defense of the city in the capital of the republic, for which it departed for, and never returned.

Tikhmenev hoped that the crews, as at the end of April with Sablin, would come to ask him to take full command, and therefore rarely appeared at the numerous meetings. On 14 June, he issued an order to the crews to vote for one of two options: go to Sevastopol or sink the ships. Tikhmenev did not offer the option to stay awaiting further developments or to fight, but about 1,000 sailors voted this way. 900 voted for Sevastopol, 450 for scuttling the ships. On 15 June, the commander announced that the referendum was in favor of Sevastopol, discarding the votes of those who chose "wait or fight" as evaders. Although most of the officers supported him, a minority, led by the commander of the destroyer Kerch Senior Lieutenant Vladimir Kukel, considered the surrender of the ships to the Germans the highest disgrace, and began to agitate for scuttling. They assessed the results of the vote as "majority against surrender". On 15 April, the crews, in view of the impending destruction of the fleet, received a salary for 5 months in advance and pensions, and in the evening Tikhmenev ordered preparations for sailing to begin. The crews of some destroyers, in particular the Ushakovsky Division, ignored the order, others began to prepare, but continued to doubt the decision. Many opponents of the campaign left the ships at night.

On the morning of 16 June, the order was given to get underway, which many destroyers did not do. Having learned about the decision to go to Sevastopol, the townspeople flooded the port and breakwaters, urging the crews to stay. The crews of many ships were reduced many times after the desertion, and simultaneously with the demonstrations, attempts to loot these ships began. In order to cut off contacts with the demonstrators, several destroyers sailed to the inner roadstead to the Volya. The water area was filled with small vessels, on which the protesters approached the ships and persuaded the crew to change their decision. Such delegations were not allowed on the Volya, but the engine crew of the Svobodnaya Rossiya, which continued to load, succumbed to agitation and refused to work, which paralyzed the ship. At one o'clock in the afternoon, Tikhmenev ordered all ships to go to the outer roadstead; Volya was followed by the destroyers Pospeshny, Bespokoiny, Derzky, and Zhivoy. The Zhivoy towed the destroyer Zharkiy, whose crew had fled. The auxiliary cruiser Troyan joined the ships, as later did the destroyer Pylki. Soon the main representatives of the Soviet government, Avilov and Vakhrameev, arrived on the Volya, but could not convince Tikhmenev to scuttle the ships. Tikhmenev scheduled a departure at 10 pm, trying to take away also Svobodnaya Rossiya. Attempts to replace her engine crew with officers and civilian craftsmen failed. The destroyer Gromky, which had set out for the roadstead in the evening, had no intention of joining the departing ships, but was soon scuttled by her small crew. At night, Tikhmenev's formation – Volya, destroyers Derzky, Pospeshny, Bespokoiny, Pylky, Zhivoy, Zharkiy in tow of the auxiliary cruiser Troyan and the baseship of high–speed boats Kresta – left for Sevastopol.

== Scuttling ==
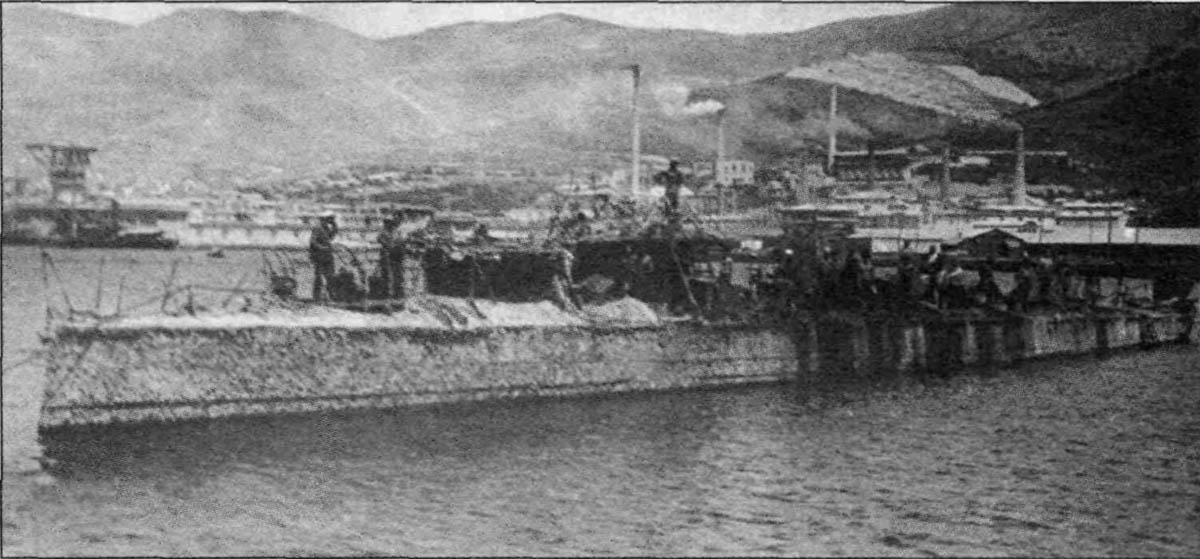
The torpedo boat Stremitelnyy, salvaged in 1926

By the morning of 18 June, a full crew remained on Kerch (about 130 people), Leytenant Shestakov had up to fifty sailors from different ships, and the other destroyers had less than 10 people each. Fidonisy had been completely abandoned by her crew, and the destroyer's officers left on a boat for Kerch. All the crews of the boats, port tugs, and naval transports, which were also going to be sunk, also fled: the Black Sea Fleet transports were mostly foreign steamships that had ended up in Russian Black Sea ports at the beginning of the First World War. It was decided to use Leytenant Shestakov as a tug and Kerch to torpedo ships. In the morning Fyodor Raskolnikov, a high-ranking official of the Council of People's Commissars, arrived at the port to supervise the scutting. He promptly took action to sink the ships on the same day. There was a real threat of German ships appearing in the roadstead. Sinking the ships by simply opening their Kingston valves was rejected due to the possibility of a quick salvage by the enemy, based on the experience of the Russo-Japanese War. It was decided to use demolition charges in the engine rooms.

To the surprise of Kukel, the commander of the Svobodnaya Rossiya, whose crew fled, Captain 1st Rank Terentyev left the ship, refusing to direct the sinking of the ship. Raskolnikov managed to recruit a crew for the steamer, which took the battleship in tow. By 4 o'clock in the afternoon all the ships to be sunk, having raised the signal "I die, but I do not surrender!", were taken out to the outer roadstead. Kerch sank Fidonisy with a torpedo, after which, within 35 minutes, all other ships were sunk by opening the Kingston valves and blowing up key mechanisms. The sinking of all ships in a short time was caused by the desire not to surrender the ships to the Germans. Approaching the Svobodnaya Rossiya, Kerch fired several torpedoes to sink the battleship. The speedboats were not sunk as they could be transported by rail to other basins. In Novorossiysk itself, where the crew of the Kerch had a bad reputation after the drowning of the officers of the Varnavinsky Regiment six months earlier, Kukel did not scuttle the destroyer, but ordered it to go to Tuapse. On the morning of 19 April, the crew scuttled their ship there and boarded a train.

=== Sunken ships ===
Name	Type		Fate
Svobodnaya Rossiya	Battleship	Sunk in Tsemes Bay on 18 June by torpedoes from the destroyer Kerch. Rests upside down at a depth of 42 meters.	In the 1930s, two main caliber turrets lying next to the hull were raised. When cutting through the hull to access the magazine, the main caliber shells detonated. During the inspection of the battleship, due to the fact that the hull was badly damaged, it was decided to abandon salvage. Wreck remains in situ.
Gadzhibey	Destroyer	Scuttled by her crew in Tsemes Bay at a depth of 32–38 meters on 18 June.	Raised on 6 December 1928 and set aside for repair. Due to extensive damage to the hull, repair was considered impractical. Hull scrapped in 1930.
Gromky	Destroyer	Scuttled in Tsemes Bay at a depth of 42 meters (abeam Cape Myskhako, 3 miles from Shirokaya Balka) on 17 June.	Wreck located in 1947 during minesweeping operations in Tsemes Bay. Lies on her left side on the seabed. Due to the corrosion of the hull, superstructures and mechanisms, salvaging for scrap was deemed unfeasible. Wreck remains in situ.
Kaliakria	Destroyer	Scuttled by her crew in Tsemes Bay at a depth of 28 meters on 18 June.	Raised on 4 October 1925 and returned to service under the name Dzerzhinsky, the only warship to return to service. On 14 May 1942, struck a Soviet mine on passage from Novorossiysk to Sevastopol, sank at a depth of about 120 meters at 44° 27′ N 31° 19′ E.
Kapitan-Leytenant Baranov	Destroyer	Scuttled in Tsemes Bay on 18 June.	Raised on 17 December 1926 and scrapped.
Kerch	Destroyer	Scuttled by her crew on 19 June 1918 at the Kadosh Lighthouse, three miles from the entrance to the Tuapse Port at a depth of 27 meters.	An attempt to raise the ship on 22 November 1929 was unsuccessful (the destroyer's hull was cut into several parts with pontoon lines). The middle part of the hull (with the engine room) was raised in 1932. After repair, the turbines of the destroyer worked for a long time at the Tuapse Power Plant. The fragments of the ship's hull remaining at the bottom were not recovered.
Leytenant Shestakov	Destroyer	Scuttled by her crew in Tsemes Bay on 18 June.	Raised on 10 December 1927. Subsequently scrapped.
Pronzitelny	Destroyer	Scuttled by her crew in Tsemes Bay on 18 June at a depth of 40 meters.	An attempt to lift, undertaken in 1926, ended in failure and the destruction of the ship. Only artillery and torpedo weapons were raised. In 1939–1941, boilers and mechanisms were lifted from the ship. The remains of the hull were raised piece by piece in 1965 and scrapped.
Smetlivy	Destroyer	Scuttled by her crew in Tsemes Bay on 18 June near the eastern breakwater at a shallow depth.	Raised on 30 July 1926 and scrapped.
Stremitelny	Destroyer	Scuttled by her crew in Tsemes Bay on 18 June near the eastern breakwater at a shallow depth.	Raised in 1926 in parts and scrapped.
Fidonisy	Destroyer	Sunk in Tsemes Bay on 18 June by a torpedo fired from the destroyer Kerch.	The wreckage of the ship, which had broken apart from the explosion of a torpedo into two parts, was discovered and partially recovered in 1964.
Elborus (former Belgian tanker Elbrus, received from Belgium in the fall of 1914 and became part of the Black Sea Fleet	Tanker	Sunk in Tsemes Bay at a depth of 20 meters on 20 June.	Raised on 21 July 1925 and repaired. Renamed Surakhanneft (from 1930), Surakhany (from 1934), Valerian Kuibyshev (from 1935). Torpedoed on 2 April 1942 on the way from Novorossiysk to Kamysh–Burun near the Taman Peninsula in the area of the Mary Magdalene Bank, 10 miles west of Anapa, at 44° 57′ N 36° 58′ E by a torpedo from a Heinkel He 111 torpedo bomber. The burning tanker drifted onto a sandbank, where it burned until 8 April, then exploded and, breaking in two, sank at a distance of 700 meters from the coast opposite the Bugaz Spit. Not raised.
Transport No. 26 (former Italian steamship Generosa (Generoso); entered the Black Sea Fleet on 12 September 1917)	Transport	Sunk in the Tsemes Bay at a depth of 25 meters on 20 June 1918.	Raised in 1934.
Transport No. 43 (former French steamship Oxus; entered the Black Sea Fleet on 12 March 1915)	Transport	Sunk in Tsemes Bay on 20 or 21 June, one mile from the breakwater at a shallow depth.	Cargo, vehicles, boilers and auxiliary mechanisms were removed prior to 1940. The hull was raised in 1965.
Transport No. 101 (former British steamship Frederica; entered the Black Sea Fleet on 12 September 1917)	Transport	Sunk in Tsemes Bay on 20 June at a depth of 26 meters.	Raised in January 1936.
Transport No. 110 (former Italian steamship Serbia; entered the Black Sea Fleet on 12 September 1917)	Transport	Sunk in Tsemes Bay on 20 or 21 June.	In 1932–1933, the machine and the boiler were raised, and in 1940, the hull. She was not completely repaired, but was listed in the Black Sea Fleet as a transport. In October 1941, while being towed, she was sunk by a proximity mine in Tsemes Bay.
Trevorian (British steamship; entered the Black Sea Fleet on 12 March 1915 as Transport No. 68, on 12 February 1917 was bought by the British Admiralty)	Transport	Sunk in Tsemes Bay on 28 June in the port near the pier of the Cement Plant at a shallow depth.	Came under British control on 26 December 1918. On 19 May 1919, sank near Anatolia while being towed from Novorossiysk to England.

== Aftermath ==
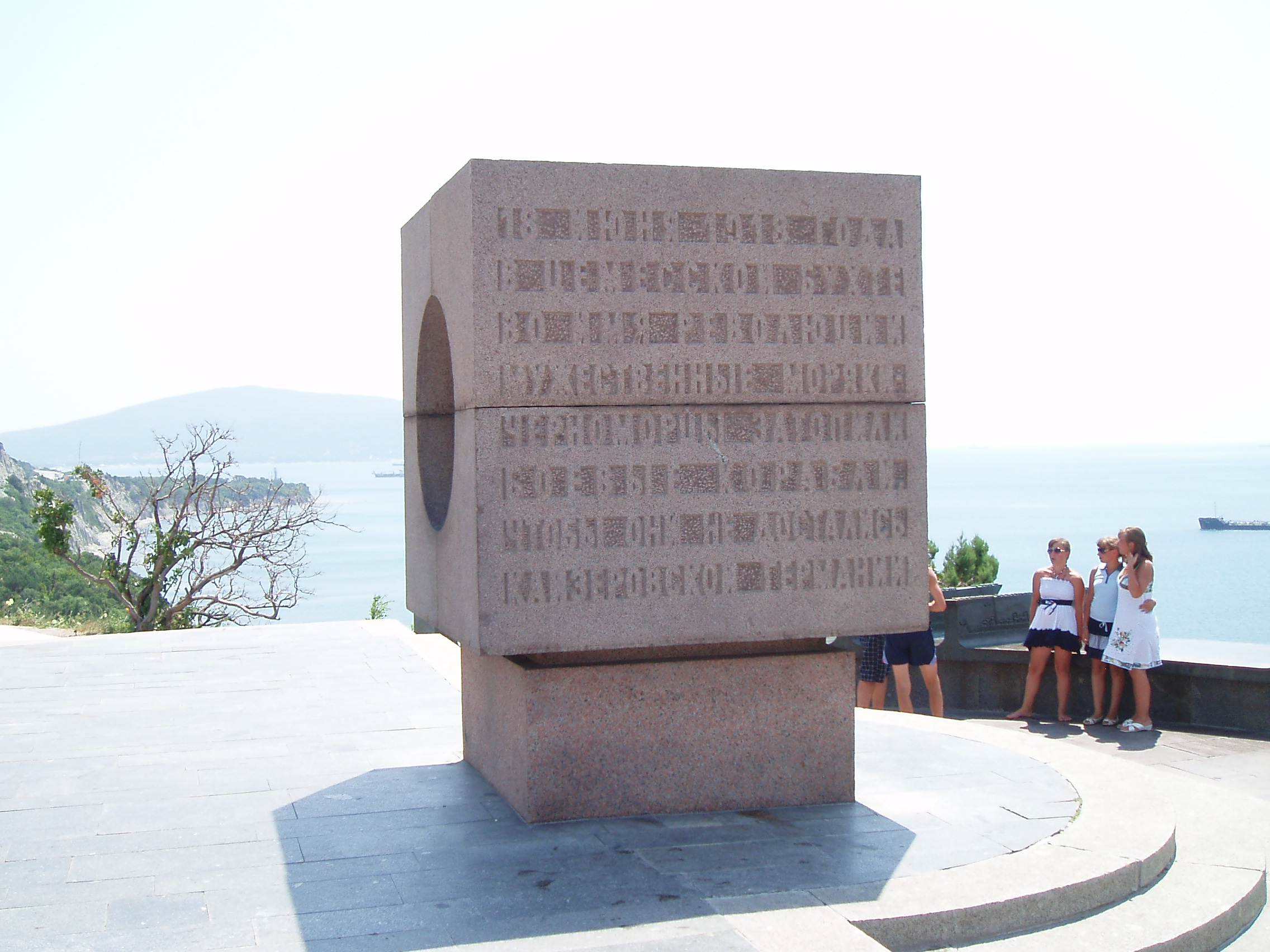
Part of the Monument to the Seamen of the Revolution – a cube with a text of thanks

The fleet that left for Sevastopol was transferred to the control of the German fleet. Most of the ships remained there until the defeat of Germany in the First World War, after which they came under the control of the Allies. They handed them over to the White Army, and many ships returned to Novorossiysk, and later became part of the Russian Squadron.

The White movement was joined by Tikhmenev and Sablin, who, after arriving in Moscow, was arrested and fled. Raskolnikov, Kukel and Avilov, who led the flooding, became prominent Bolshevik leaders of the Soviet state, and in the late 1930s they were repressed.

In the 1920s, the salvage of ships sunk in Tsemes Bay began, some of them were repaired, for example, the destroyer Kaliakria (later Dzerzhinsky). By the beginning of the 21st century, only Svobodnaya Rossiya and Gromky remained unsalvaged.

== Monument ==
In 1980, at the 12th kilometer of the Sukhum Highway of Novorossiysk, the monument to the sailors of the revolution "I die, but I do not surrender!" was unveiled by the sculptor Vladimir Tsigal and architects Yakov Belopolsky, Roman Kananin and Vladimir Khavin. On the far side of the road from the sea rises a 12–meter granite monument of a kneeling sailor. On the side of the sea there is a cube with a thank you text and a flag signal "I die, but I do not surrender!" inside, as well as signs of ships with the direction and distance to the places of their sinking with an accuracy of a hundredth of a mile.

== See also ==
- Bibliography of the Russian Revolution and Civil War
- Outline of the Russian Revolution and Civil War
- Index of articles related to the Russian Revolution and Civil War
- The "Russian" Civil Wars, 1916–1926: Ten Years That Shook the World
- Russia in Flames: War, Revolution, Civil War, 1914–1921
- Russia in Revolution: An Empire in Crisis, 1890 to 1928
- Russia: Revolution and Civil War, 1917—1921
- The Russian Revolution: A New History

== Sources ==
- Harald Graf. On «Novik». Baltic Fleet in War and Revolution / Preface and Comments by Vladimir Gribovsky – Saint Petersburg: Publishing House "Gangut", 1997 – 488 Pages With Illustrations. ISBN 5-85875-106-7. Circulation: 5300 Copies // 2nd Edition. Reprinted From the Edition: Harald Graf. On «Novik». R. Oldenburg Printing House, Munich, 1922
- Nikolay Gutan (1992). "From Sevastopol to Novorossiysk" (4). Prepared the Publication by L. A. Kuznetsov, Archaeographic Sample and Commentary by A. E. Ioffe (Gangut Magazine ed.). Saint Petersburg: Gangut: 98–111.
- Civil War in Russia: Black Sea Fleet / Compiled by Vitaly Dotsenko – Moscow: Limited Liability Company "ACT Publishing House", 2002 – 544 Pages: 16 Sheets of Illustrations – (Military History Library). ISBN 5-17-012874-6. Circulation 5100 Copies // Vladimir Kukel. The Truth About the Death of the Black Sea Fleet on June 18, 1918 – Leningrad: 1923
