= Navy of the Ukrainian People's Republic =

- Військово-морський флот Української Народної Республіки
- Naval ensign (1918–1921)
- Active: 1917–1921
- Disbanded: 1921
- Country: Ukrainian People's Republic (1917–1918; 1918–1921); Ukrainian State (1918)
- Branch: Navy
- Role: Naval warfare
- Colors: Yellow and blue
- Anniversaries: 29 April
- Ships: October 1917–March 1918: 9 battleships; 7 cruisers; 18 destroyers; 14 submarines; 16 patrol ships and avisos; 11 military transports and mother ships
- Engagements: February Revolution; October Revolution; World War I; Operation Faustschlag; Crimea Operation; Russian Civil War; Battle of Odesa

Commanders
- Secretary General of the Naval Ministry: Dmytro Antonovych
- Commander-in-Chief of the Navy: Mikhail Sablin
- Commander of the Navy: Viacheslav Klochkovsky
- Marine Minister: Sviatoslav Shramchenko

Insignia
- Original naval ensign of the Ukrainian People's Republic, adopted January 18, 1918

- St. Andrew's Saltire, used by Rear Admiral Mikhail Sablin

The Navy of the Ukrainian People's Republic (Ukrainian: Військово-морський флот Української Народної Республіки, romanized: Viiskovo-morskyi flot Ukrainskoi Narodnoi Respubliky) was the maritime service branch of the Ukrainian People's Republic (UPR) from 1917 to 1918 and from 1918 to 1921, and the Ukrainian State from July until December 1918.

Its main fighting force was located in the Black Sea, consisting of the ships that formerly made up the Imperial Russian Navy's Black Sea Fleet, until it was taken by the Entente and given to the Whites in 1918. A marine division and river flotilla were founded in 1919 and 1920 respectively, and Ukraine naval authorities formally existed until 1921.

== History ==
=== 1917 ===
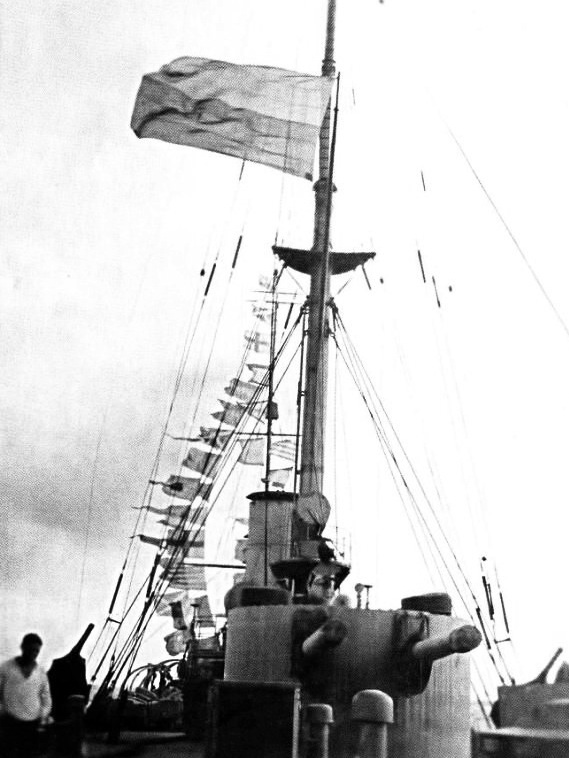
The blue and yellow flag flying aboard the cruiser Pamiat Merkuria, November 1917

Beginning after the February Revolution of 1917, Ukrainization spread over the Black Sea Fleet. In April, the Sevastopol Ukrainian Black Sea Society organized a rally involving many seamen. It was attended by Admiral Alexander Kolchak, commander of the Black Sea Fleet, who expressed his support for the group. Following this, it grew to 4,000 members. Most of the Russian staff were moved and replaced with Ukrainians. Beginning in October, the crews of ships began establishing councils and raising Ukrainian flags; the first ship to do this was the destroyer Zavidny, which first flew the Ukrainian flag on July 12.

After the October Revolution, seamen and officers of the Black Sea Fleet set up a battalion of 612 men. The unit went to Kyiv to provide armed support to the Central Rada. Bolshevik seamen, mostly consisting of delegates from the Baltic Fleet, won over the remainder of the Black Sea Fleet for the Bolsheviks. In November 1917, the Central Rada proclaimed the Ukrainian Republic. On 22 November, the dreadnought Volya—the newest and most powerful warship of the Black Sea Fleet—along with several other ships and submarines, "made fealty" to the Central Rada.

On 22 December, the Ministry of Naval Affairs was established in Kyiv. Dmytro Antonovych was appointed its Secretary General. Following this, Antonovych ordered all Ukrainianized ships to move from Sevastopol to Odesa. This was protested by the Bolshevik-dominated Tsentroflot (Central Fleet), but the Ukrainianized ships did not listen. The exception to this was Volya, which remained in Sevastopol. That same month, the Ukrainian Military-Naval Council and the Ukrainian Naval General Staff were both formed in Kyiv by Captain Yu. Pokrovsky.

=== 1918 ===
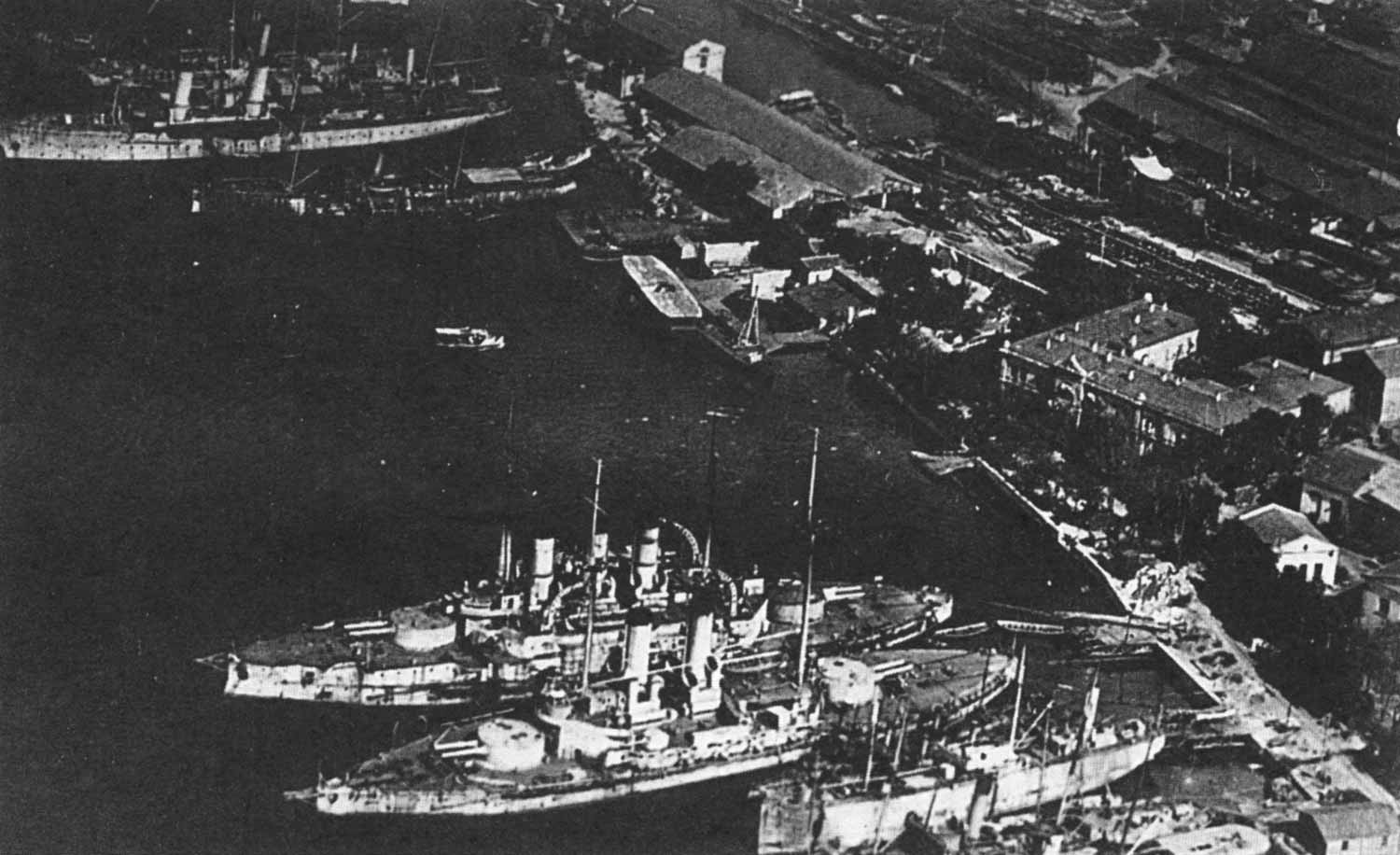
Ukrainian warships in the port of Sevastopol, 1918

On 18 January 1918, the Central Rada approved "A Temporary Law on the [UPR’s] Fleet", which proclaimed that the entire Black Sea Fleet was Ukrainian. It also placed all ports in the Black Sea and Sea of Azov under Ukrainian command. On 27 January, the provisional law on Navy of the Ukrainian People's Republic officially approved the blue and yellow flag as a state symbol.

Ukrainianized ships gathered in the port of Odesa. Several ships that supported the Central Fleet also arrived to "keep an eye" on the Ukrainian ships. On the night of 28 January, street fights broke out between Red Guards and Ukrainian troops in Odesa. The Bolsheviks persuaded the crews of the Ukrainian ships to remain out of action. The Central Fleet opened fire on Odesa, firing over 100 shells and killing many civilians. The Bolsheviks subsequently seized power in the city and handed all the ships over to them.

In February, the Germans launched Operation Faustschlag with the hopes of capturing the Black Sea Fleet. They reached Sevastopol by 28 April. Rear Admiral Mikhail Sablin hoped that Ukrainian forces would help save the ships in Sevastopol from being captured. Sablin entered into talks with the Germans, hoping to cease hostilities; however, the Germans rejected these proposals for an armistice and continued hostilities.

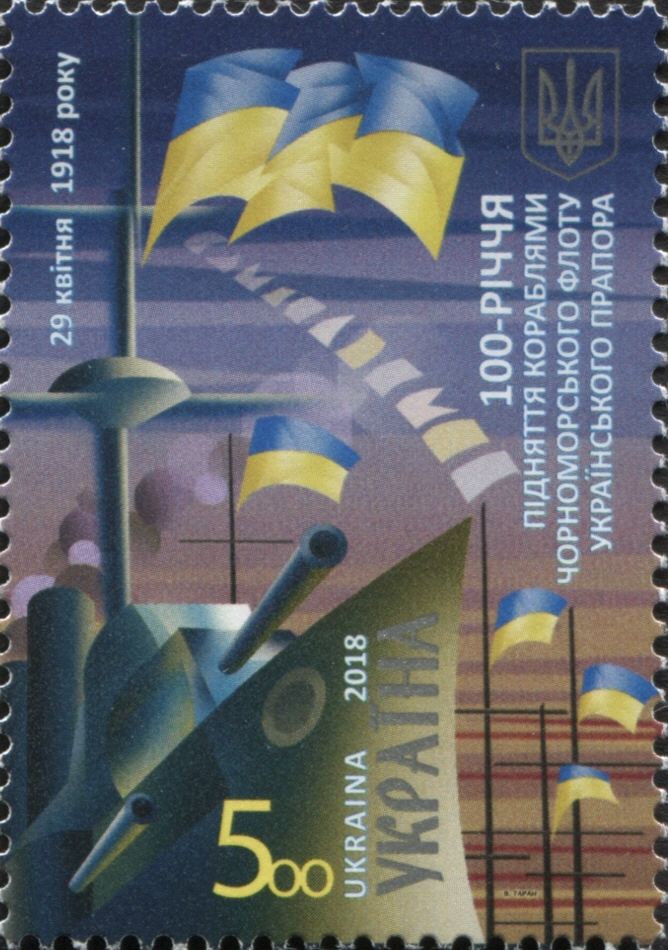
A stamp depicting Ukrainian flags being raised by warships in Sevastopol; issued for the 100th anniversary on April 29, 2018

On 29 April, the entire Black Sea Fleet was handed over to the Ukrainian People's Republic. Sablin was appointed Commander-in-Chief of the Navy, and a telegram was sent out to Kyiv: “Effective today the Sevastopol fortress and the Fleet in Sevastopol raised the Ukrainian flag. Sablin assumed the command of the Fleet”. Having no reply the admiral ordered to repeat the telegram beginning with the words “Comrades of [the] Kiev Central Rada...”, unaware that the Rada had been deposed by Pavlo Skoropadsky. At 4:00 PM, Sablin signaled from the battleship Georgii Pobedonosets for the other ships to hoist Ukrainian flags. All ships complied save for the torpedo boat Pronzitelnyi, which instead continued to fly a red flag. To avoid confrontation, Sablin ordered Pronzitelnyi to leave Sevastopol and move to Novorossiysk.

On 30 April, Sablin took a portion of the fleet to Novorossiysk and hoisted the St. Andrew's Saltire, proclaimed the new Ukrainian ensign. The Germans captured the remainder of Sevastopol on 1 May. The Ukrainian colors were struck from the ships there and the entire fleet was declared as "war booty". The Germans issued an ultimatum to return one dreadnought and six destroyers from Novorossiysk to Sevastopol where they would be captured, and the Ukrainians complied on 17 June. The ships that remained in Novorossiysk were destroyed per orders issued by Vladimir Lenin.

On 18 July, the Ministry of Naval Affairs in Kyiv established a new naval ensign and rank flags. From July to November, at the request of the secretariat, the Germans slowly transferred many ships under the command of the Skoropadsky-led Ukrainian State. The Navy received their ships and sent them to Odesa. However, they were in poor condition. The gunboat Kubanets was unable to leave her pier even once before she was captured by the White Guard. Skoropadsky took measures to obtain the remainder of the ships from the Germans in Sevastopol. Rear Admiral Viacheslav Klochkovsky was stationed in the city starting from 10 June to serve as Skoropadsky's permanent representative.

The conditions to free the Black Sea Fleet experienced beneficial conditions following the end of World War I. On 11 November, when Germany and Austria-Hungary both capitulated, Skoropadsky claimed his right to the fleet and appointed Klochovsky as its commander. Representatives of the Crimean Regional Government and the White movement also claimed rights to the fleet. Because of this, the Germans decided not to release any more ships until the Triple Entente's fleet arrived in the Black Sea. This happened on 24 November, and the Germans allowed Ukrainian officers in Sevastopol to return to their old ships.

That same day, Klochkovsky—in collusion with White Guard representative and Captain Alexander Tikhmenev—gave the order to hoist the St. Andrew's Saltire on all ships, hoping to show good intentions. However, the ships docked in Odesa and Sevastopol were taken by the Entente. Several months later, they were handed over to the "legitimate Russian authorities", being the Whites. Some of the vessels were taken by the French and taken to Bizerte. Some ended up in the French Navy while others were scrapped.

=== 1919–1921 ===
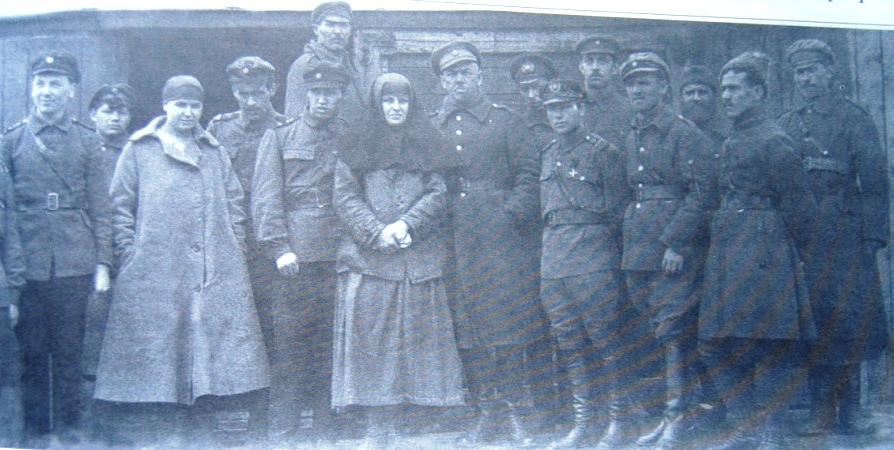
A group of Ukrainian marines detained in a Polish camp, 1920

In May 1919, a marine division was formed by Mykhailo Bilynsky, a nobleman and economist, after realizing that the Black Sea Fleet would not be reclaimed. Just more than one regiment was ever formed, but this unit was "one of the best of the [Ukrainian People's Republic's] army", and successfully fought both the Bolsheviks and the White Army. In August 1919, Ukrainian troops successfully reclaimed the port of Odesa. The Naval Directorate, which had been created in September 1919 to replace the previous Ministry of Naval Affairs, set up a naval cadet school in Kamianets-Podilskyi.

The Dnieper River Flotilla was formed in the summer of 1920, made up of graduates of the naval cadet school in Kamianets-Podilskyi.

Ukrainian naval authorities existed until 1921.

== List of ships ==
From October 1917 until March 1918, the Navy of the Ukrainian People's Republic consisted of:

- 9 battleships
- 7 cruisers
- 18 destroyers
- 14 submarines
- 16 patrol ships and avisos
- 11 military transports and mother ships

== See also ==
- Imperial Russian Navy, the predecessor to the Navy of the Ukrainian People's Republic
- Soviet Navy, the successor to the Navy of the Ukrainian People's Republic
