= Alexander Tikhmenev =

Russian Army Commander

Alexander Ivanovich Tikhmenev
- Александр Иванович Тихменев
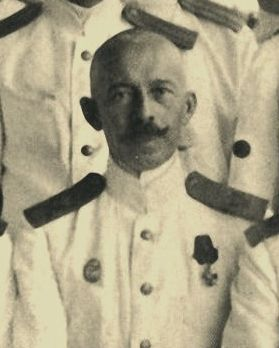
- Born: 30 December 1879
- Died: 25 April 1959 (aged 79); Tunisia
- Military career
- Allegiance: Russian Empire
- Branch: Imperial Russian Navy
- Service years: 1901–1924
- Rank: Rear Admiral
- Commands: Zhutky; Bespokoiny; Volya
- Conflicts: World War I Russian Civil War
- Awards: Order of Saint Vladimir; Order of Saint Anne; Order of Saint Stanislaus; Order of the Medjidie

Alexander Ivanovich Tikhmenev (Russian: Александр Иванович Тихменев; 30 December 1879 – 25 April 1959) was the military commander of the Russian Imperial and White Fleets, Rear Admiral, Chief of Staff of the Russian Squadron.

== Biography ==
- 1901 – Graduated from the Marine Corps with a promotion to warrant officer.
- 1901–1902 – Chief of the Watch of transport Bug.
- April 30, 1903 – Chief of Watch of the cruiser Pamiat' Merkuria.
- 1904 – Graduated from the mine officer class.
- 1905 – Mine officer of the battleship Tri Sviatitelia.
- 1906–1907 – Mine officer of the battleship Dvenadsat Apostolov and the gunboat Terets.
- 1908 – Commander of Destroyer No. 272, teacher at the mine school of the Black Sea Fleet.
- 1911 – Senior Lieutenant, Acting Senior Officer of the cruiser Pamiat' Merkuria.
- 6 December 1913 – Captain 2nd rank for "distinction in service".
- 1914–1915 – Commander of the destroyer Zhutky.
- 1915–1917 – Commander of the destroyer Bespokoiny.
- 1917 – Captain 1st rank and commander of the battleship Volya.
- In June 1918, he took command of the Black Sea Fleet from Vice Admiral Mikhail Sablin when he left for Moscow to discuss the issue of scuttling the fleet.

Tikhmenev was buried at the Borgel Cemetery in Tunis.

== Distinctions ==
- Order of Saint Stanislaus, 2nd Class with Swords;
- Order of Saint Anne, 2nd Class with Swords;
- Order of Saint Vladimir, 4th Class with Swords and Bow;
- Turkish Medjidie Order of the 4th Class.

== Sources ==
- "Tikhmenev, Alexander Ivanovich". Big Russian Biographical Encyclopedia (Electronic Edition) (Version 3.0 ed.). Moscow: Businessoft, Publishing House Home Computer. 2007.
- Chronos
