= Russian destroyer Derzky =

Imperial Russian destroyer

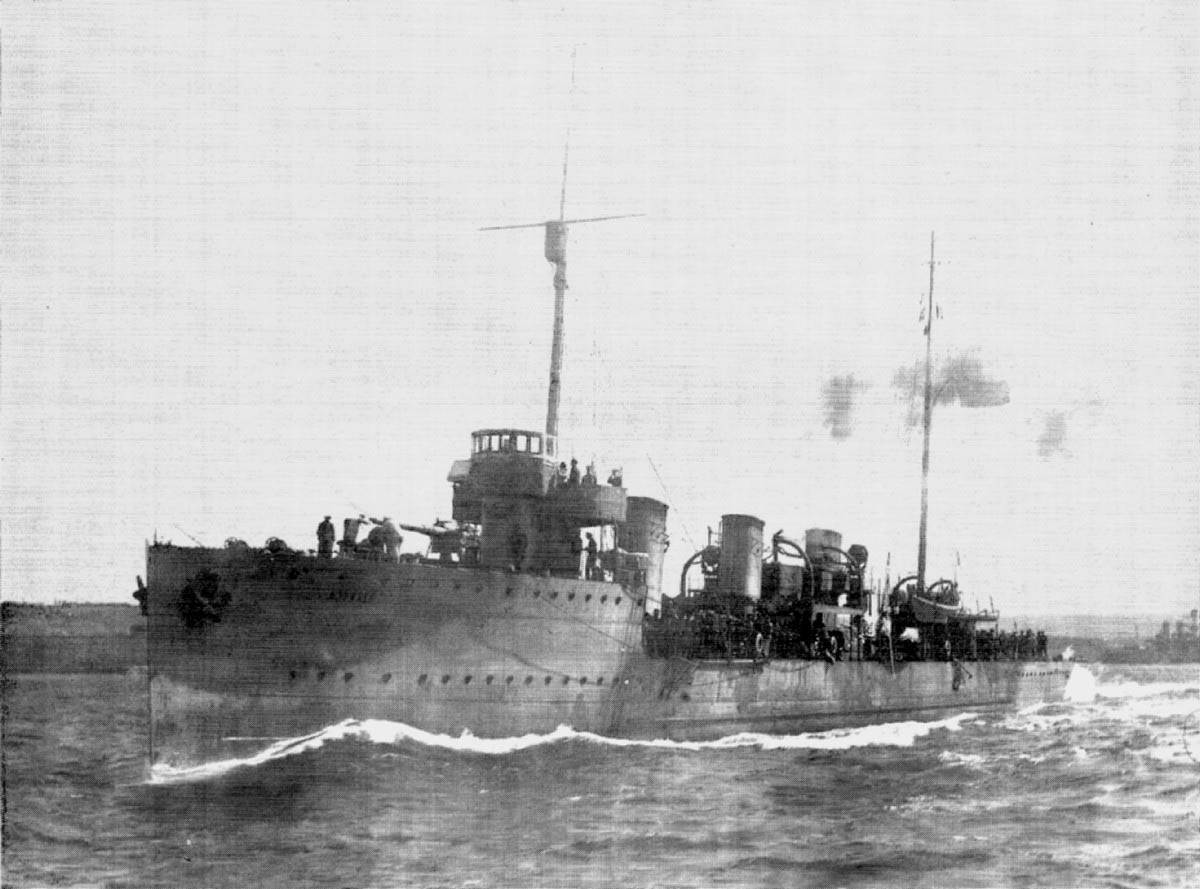

History

Russian Empire
- Name: Derzky
- Builder: Naval Yard, Mykolaiv
- Launched: 15 March 1914
- Commissioned: 29 October 1914
- Fate: To Bolshevik control, 29 December 1917

Russian SFSR
- Operator: Red Fleet
- Acquired: 29 December 1917
- Fate: Seized by Imperial Germany on 31 October 1918

White Army
- Operator: Wrangel's Fleet (part of the White Army in Southern Russia)
- Acquired: September 1919
- Out of service: 29 December 1920
- Fate: Scrapped, early 1930s

General characteristics (as built)
- Class & type: Derzky-class destroyer
- Displacement: 1,100 long tons (1,118 t) standard; 1,320 long tons (1,341 t) full load
- Length: 98 m (321 ft 6 in)
- Beam: 9.3 m (30 ft 6 in)
- Draught: 3.2 m (10 ft 6 in)
- Installed power: 5 boilers; 19,000 kW (25,500 hp)
- Propulsion: 2 shaft Brown Boverei turbines
- Speed: 34 knots (63 km/h; 39 mph) design
- Complement: 125
- Armament: 3 × 102 mm (4 in) guns; 2 × 47 mm (1.9 in) AA guns; 4 × machine guns; 10 × 457 mm (18 in) torpedo tubes, (5 × 2); 80 mines

Derzky (Russian: Дерзкий) was a Derzky-class destroyer of the Imperial Russian Navy. The destroyer was built at the Naval Yard, Mykolaiv, (Note: Known as Nikolayev in Russian) Ukraine, was launched on 15 March 1914 and completed later that year. Derzky served in the Black Sea Fleet during the First World War. The ship transferred to Soviet control in December 1917, and fought for them in the Russian Civil War, but was seized by the German Navy in October 1918, and after the end of the First World War was handed over to the Allies, who handed the ship over to White Russian control. Derzky evacuated from Sevastopol in November 1920 and was interned at Bizerte before being scrapped in the early 1930s.

== Design and construction ==
In 1911, as a result of tensions with Turkey, the Russian State Duma approved a shipbuilding programme aimed at strengthening the Black Sea Fleet, with three battleships, nine destroyers and six submarines to be built by 1915. The requirement for the destroyers was based on those that resulted in the Novik, but demanded a slightly smaller ship. Armament was to be three 102 mm (4 inch) guns and ten 457 mm (18 inch) torpedo tubes with a speed of 34 kn (39 mph; 63 km/h). (Note: Contract speed was 30 kn (35 mph; 56 km/h) according to Fock.) Detailed design contracts were placed with the Naval Yard and the Putilov shipyard. The Naval Yard's design would be used for the four ships to be built by the naval yard, while Putilov's design would be used for the other five ships.

The Naval yard's design was 98.0 m (321 ft 6 in) long, with a beam of 9.3 m (30 ft 6 in) and a draught of 3.2 m (10 ft 6 in). Displacement was 1,100 long tons (1,100 t) normal and 1,320 long tons (1,340 t) full load. Five Thornycroft three-drum water-tube boilers supplied steam to two sets of Brown Boveri steam turbines rated at 25,500 shp (19,000 kW). The ships had three funnels. The main gun armament was three 102 mm (4 inch) guns, backed up by two 47 mm anti-aircraft guns, and four 7.62 mm machine guns. The ship carried five twin 457 mm (18 inch) torpedo tubes and had rails for 80 mines. The ship's crew was 125 officers and other ranks. (Note: Watts gives a crew of 160, while Fock claims a crew of 93.)

Derzky was laid down on 31 October 1913, (Note: New Style date: 18 October 1913 Old Style) launched on 15 March 1914 and commissioned on 29 October 1914.

== Service ==
=== Black Sea Fleet ===
When Russia declared war on the Ottoman Empire, the four just-commissioned Naval Yard-built Derzky-class destroyers were the most powerful torpedo craft in the Black Sea, outclassing Turkish destroyers and torpedo boats. They were soon pressed into action, and on the evening of 5 November, Derzky and sister ships Bespokoiny, Gnevny and Pronzitelny laid mines to the north west of the entrance to the Bosphorus. Derzky continued to carry out minelaying operations, as well as attacks against Turkish coastal shipping and shore bombardment duties.

On 23–24 December 1914, Derzki, Bespokoiny, Gnevny and Pronzitelny were supporting operations by the Black Sea Fleet to lay mines and block the port of Zonguldak with blockships. (Zonguldak was the main port for the despatch of coal to Constantinople, which the Russians wanted to stop.) On 24 December the four destroyers clashed with the German light cruiser Breslau, engaging the cruiser with gunfire to allow the Russian cruisers Pamiat Merkuria and Kagul to join in, but as the Russian cruisers approached, Breslau broke off the engagement. (Note: The Russian attack on Zonguldak was a failure, with Breslau sinking two of the blockships on the night of 23/24 December, and the other two being sunk by Turkish coastal artillery.) The four Russian destroyers encountered Breslau again on 25 December, but Breslau escaped again.

On 4 January 1915, the four destroyers and Pamiat Merkuria encountered the Turkish cruiser Hamidiye, but although they hit Hamidiye several times, the Turkish cruiser escaped, while Derzki and Pronzitelny both suffering gun failures. Derzki's rear gun burst, destroying the gun and causing a fire aboard the ship. Later that evening, the four destroyers stopped and sank the Italian steamer Maria Rosetta (Note: Marie Rosette according to Langensiepen and Güleryüz), laden with a cargo of oil. On 11–15 March 1915, Derzky, Gnevny and Pronzitelny scouted the Black Sea coastline of East Thrace, while from 27 to 31 March that year, the same three destroyers formed part of the escort for Russian battleships as they bombarded targets near the mouth of the Bosphorus. In April, the Black Sea Fleet deployed its destroyers on a campaign against Turkish sea communications, with Derzky, Gnevny and Pronzitelny carrying out a sortie along the Anatolian coast on 14–15 April, sinking four steamers and 30 sailing vessels. On 25 April, during another sortie along the Anatolian coast, Derzki suffered from salt water contamination of her boilers, and was sent back to Sevastopol for repairs. On 9 May, Derzky and the cruiser Pamiat Merkuria attacked Ereğli, sinking a steamship.

On the night of 10/11 June 1915, Derzki and Gnevny attacked Zonguldak, sinking two steamers, then continued their sortie towards the Bosporus. At about 30 nmi (35 mi; 56 km) north of the straits, the two destroyers encountered Breslau. A brief battle took place, with Breslau illuminating Gnevny with searchlights and hitting Gnevny with several salvos before turning away to avoid torpedoes launched by Gnevny. Derzki, meanwhile, hit Breslau several times with 102 mm shells before losing contact with the cruiser, although little damage was caused. Gnevny was badly damaged, with the destroyer's main steam main breached and the ship immobilised. Derzki took Gnevny under tow, returning safely to Sebastopol. On 16 June Derzki and Gnevny attacked the steamer Edirne near Karasu, damaging the steamer with gunfire before sinking her with torpedoes. On 15 July, as the Russian campaign against Turkish communications continued, Derzki, Bespokoiny and Pronzitelny shelled Zonguldak, sinking the steamer Seyhun (which was raised and repaired a few days later) and causing minor damage to the Turkish destroyer Yadigar-i Millet and the steamer Eresos. The next day the three Russian destroyers continued their cruise along the Anatolian coast, sinking a steamer and a lighter.

In October 1915, Bulgaria joined the war as part of the Central Powers, and the Russian campaign against the Turkish coal transports was scaled back, with the Black Sea Fleet concentrating on operations off Bulgaria. On 29 November 1915, the German submarine UC-13 ran aground about 55 nmi (63 mi; 102 km) east of the Bosporus, and was scuttled by the submarine's crew. On 10 December, Derzki, Bespokoiny and Gnevny caught two Turkish gunboats, Taşköprü and Yozgat, which had been sent to salvage material from the wreck of UC-13, and sank them in the Battle of Kirpen Island.

On 27 January 1916, Derzki set out as part of the escort for the battleship Imperatritsa Mariya on another sortie against Zonguldak, but Derzki suffered from mechanical problems that could not be rectified at sea, forcing the operation to be aborted. On 14 April, Derzki, Bespokoiny and Pronzitelny operated in support of the Russian offensive against Trabzon, claiming 58 sailing ships carrying supplies to the Turkish army sunk. On 11 June, Derzky was part of the escort for the battleship Imperatritsa Ekaterina Velikaya which was operating off the Lazistan coast when the German submarine U-38 attacked the battleship. U-38's two torpedoes missed Imperatritsa Ekaterina Velikaya, which was zig-zagging, and Bespokoiny and Derzki both counter-attacked, with Derzki deploying an explosive sweep, but U-38 escaped undamaged. On 22 July, Derzki, Bespokoiny, Gnevny, Schastlivy, Pylki and Schastlivy accompanied the battleship Imperatritsa Mariya and the cruiser Kagul in an attempt to intercept Breslau, which intelligence had warned was on a minelaying sortie in the Black Sea. The two forces met later that day, and while Breslau's 150 mm (5.9 in) guns managed to keep the Russian destroyers from closing, a long chase developed, with Breslau receiving damage from near misses by Imperatritsa Mariya's guns. Eventually, Breslau drew away from the Russian force, and the five destroyers were ordered to continue to follow the German ship, and deliver a torpedo attack under cover of darkness. The destroyers lost contact with Breslau due to a rain storm.

In August 1916, the Russian large destroyers were busy with minelaying operations, with Derzky laying mines at the approaches to the Bosporus on the night of 3/4 August (with Bespokoiny, Gnevny and Pronzitelny), on 6/7 August (with Bespokoiny and Pronzitelny) and on 8/9 August (with Bespokoiny, Gromki and Pronzitelny). On 20–21 August, Derzky and Pronzitelny laid mines off the Turkish coast. On 21 August, the same two destroyers captured the steamer Turkestan and took the ship back to Sevastapol as a prize. The minelaying operations were very effective, bringing shipments of coal and food to Constantinople to an almost complete halt, causing bread rations to be reduced, while the coal shortage caused the operations of the Turkish fleet to be restricted. On 29 October, Derzky, Pronzitelny and Schastlivy were ordered to attack the Romanian port of Constanța, recently captured by the Germans, in order to destroy the large stocks of oil and petrol left in the port, but bad weather caused the operation to be abandoned. A second attempt on 2 November, with the cruiser Pamiat Merkuria escorted by Derzky, Pospeshny and Schastlivy was also a failure, but a third attempt by Pamiat Merkuria on 4 November was more successful, with most of the oil tanks destroyed. From 29 November to 2 December, Derzky and Pylki laid 120 mines west of the entrance to the Bosporus, extending the minefield with a further 119 mines on 5 December. The German submarine UB-46 struck a mine in this minefield on 7 December 1916, sinking with all hands.

Derzky and Pospeshny carried out a sortie along the coast of eastern Anatolia on 28–29 January 1917, sinking 13 sailing boats and capturing 7 more. They repeated the operation on 31 January destroying another 2 sailing boats. (Note: By this time, sailing vessels were the only vessels maintaining transport along the Turkish coast.)

=== Russian Civil War ===
When the October Revolution reached the Black Sea Fleet, Derzki's crew sided with the Bolsheviks, and in November 1917, Derzki was part of a force sent to the Don to assist sailors who were fighting anti-Bolshevik Cossack troops led by General Alexey Kaledin, but the ships arrived too late to be of assistance and returned to Sevastopol in early December. Between 15 and 20 December, the seamen of the Black Sea Fleet carried out a violent purge of its officers, with many deaths. Derzky's commanding officer and watch officer were both killed. In January 1918, Romania intervened in Bessarabia, and on 26 January Derzky transported a commission from the Central Committee of the Black Sea Fleet to Kiliia to help organise the Bolshevik defence. In March 1918, Derzky went to the assistance of Red Guards at Sukhumi, who were fighting Georgian troops, shelling the outskirts of the city.

While an Armistice between Russia and the Central Powers was signed in December 1917, Germans forces advanced deep into Ukraine following the Treaty of Brest-Litovsk in March 1918, and on 12 May 1918, Derzki left Sevastopol for Novorossiysk with much of the Black Sea Fleet. In June 1918, Germany threatened to attack Novorossiysk if the Black Sea Fleet did not return to Sevastopol where it would be under German control. Although the Bolshevik government had given secret orders that the fleet should be scuttled rather than surrendered to the Germans, the decision was put to a vote by the ships' crews at a public meeting, and Derzky, together with several other destroyers and torpedo boats and the battleship Volya sailed for Sevastopol and internment by the Germans on 18 June. On 1 October 1918, Germany seized control of Derzky and a number of other warships, with the intention of commissioning them into the German Navy, but the end of the war brought a halt to these plans.

On 26 November 1918, an Allied fleet arrived at Sevastopol, and took control of the Black Sea Fleet ships under the terms of the Armistice, with Derzki coming under British control, and crewed by officers and men from the British battleship HMS Superb. The ship was moved to Smyrna in April 1919, and was refitted at Malta before being transferred to White Russian control, returning to Smyrna under tow by the British cruiser HMS Dublin on 20 January 1920, and was handed over to the crew of Pospeshny. At the end of March, White Russian troops and refugees were evacuated from Novorossiysk, with Derzki assisting in evacuating troops from Tuapse on 27 March. After the evacuations, Derzky continued to support White Russian forces, and in September carried out operations in the Sea of Azov to support a White Russian offensive. On 14 November 1920, Derzky left Sevastopol as part of the final Evacuation of the Crimea, passing via Istanbul to Bizerte where the ship was interned by the French on 29 December 1920. On 29 October 1924, the French government recognised Soviet ownership of the interned ships of Wrangel's fleet, but the ships were not returned and were eventually sold by the Soviets to a French company for scrap, with Derzky being broken up in 1933.
