= Russian cruiser General Kornilov =

Russian cruiser General Kornilov may refer to:

- Russian cruiser Ochakov (1902)
- Soviet cruiser Komintern
