= Central Committee of the Black Sea Fleet =

Historic Russian military command

The Central Committee of the Black Sea Fleet or Black Sea Tsentroflot (Russian: Центральный комитет Черноморского флота (ЦКЧФ или Черноморский Центрофлот)) was a collegial organ that commanded the Russian Imperial Black Sea Fleet during the time period of the Russian Revolution of 1917 and the subsequent Russian Civil War.

== See also ==
- Tsentrobalt in the Baltic Sea
- Tsentroflot, a 1917 attempt of central command of the Russian Fleet right before the October Revolution
