= Russian destroyer Bespokoiny (1913) =

Imperial Russian destroyer

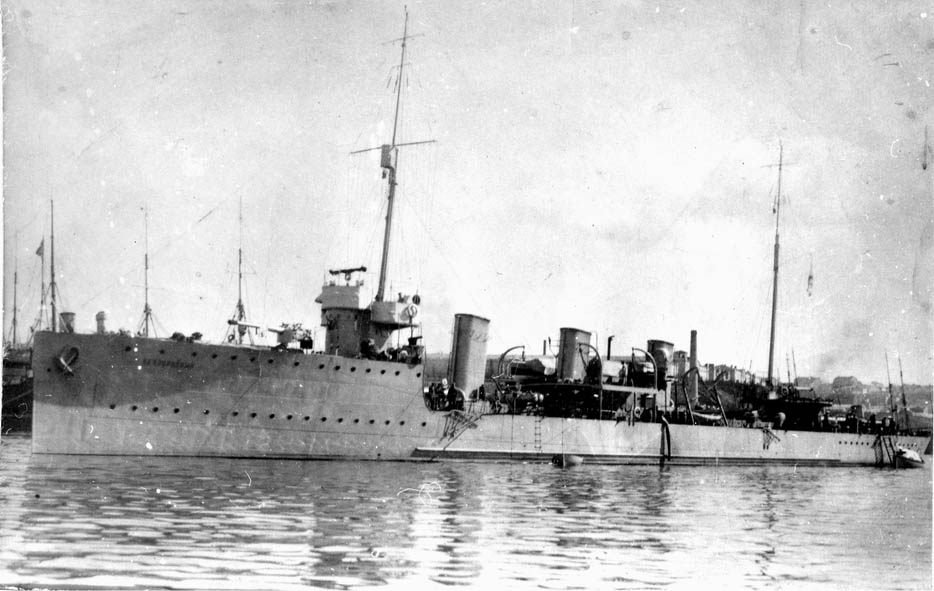

History

Russian Empire
- Name: Bespokoiny
- Builder: Naval Yard, Mykolaiv
- Launched: 31 October 1913
- Commissioned: 29 October 1914
- Fate: To Bolshevik control 29 December 1917

Russian SFSR
- Name: Bespokoiny
- Operator: Red Fleet
- Acquired: 29 December 1917
- Fate: Seized by Imperial Germany on 31 October 1918

White Army
- Name: Bespokoiny
- Operator: Wrangel's Fleet (part of the White Army in Southern Russia)
- Acquired: September 1919
- Out of service: 29 December 1920
- Fate: Scrapped early 1930s

General characteristics (as built)
- Class & type: Derzky-class destroyer
- Displacement: 1,100 long tons (1,118 t) standard; 1,320 long tons (1,341 t) full load
- Length: 98 m (321 ft 6 in)
- Beam: 9.3 m (30 ft 6 in)
- Draught: 3.2 m (10 ft 6 in)
- Installed power: 5 boilers; 19,000 kW (25,500 hp)
- Propulsion: 2 shaft Brown Boverei turbines
- Speed: 34 knots (63 km/h; 39 mph)
- Complement: 125
- Armament: 3 × 102 mm (4.0 in) guns; 2 × 47 mm (1.9 in) AA guns; 4 × machine guns; 10 × 457 mm (18 in) torpedo tubes, (5 × 2); 80 mines

Bespokoiny (Russian: Беспокойный) was a Derzky-class destroyer of the Imperial Russian Navy. The destroyer was built at the Naval Yard, Mykolaiv, (Note: Known as Nikolayev in Russian) Ukraine, was launched on 18 October 1913 and completed in 1914. Bespokoiny served in the Black Sea Fleet during the First World War. The ship transferred to Soviet control in December 1917, but was seized by the German Navy in October 1918, and after the end of the war was handed over to the Allies, who handed the ship over to White Russian control. Bespokoiny evacuated from Sevastopol in November 1920 and was interned at Bizerte before being scrapped in the early 1930s.

== Design and construction ==
In 1911, as a result of tensions with Turkey, the Russian State Duma approved a shipbuilding programme aimed at strengthening the Black Sea Fleet, with three battleships, nine destroyers and six submarines to be built by 1915. The requirement for the destroyers was based on those that resulted in the Novik, but demanded a slightly smaller ship. Armament was to be three 102 mm (4 inch) guns and ten 457 mm (18 inch) torpedo tubes with a speed of 34 kn (39 mph; 63 km/h). (Note: Contract speed was 30 kn (35 mph; 56 km/h) according to Fock.) Detailed design contracts were placed with the Naval Yard and the Putilov shipyard. The Naval Yard's design would be used for the four ships to be built by the naval yard, while Putilov's design would be used for the other five ships.

The Naval yard's design was 98.0 m (321 ft 6 in) long, with a beam of 9.3 m (30 ft 6 in) and a draught of 3.2 m (10 ft 6 in). Displacement was 1,100 long tons (1,100 t) normal and 1,320 long tons (1,340 t) full load. Five Thornycroft three-drum water-tube boilers supplied steam to two sets of Brown Boveri steam turbines rated at 25,500 shp (19,000 kW). Bespokoiny was the fastest ship of the class, reaching 32.7 kn (37.6 mph; 60.6 km/h) during sea trials. The ships had three funnels. The main gun armament was three 102 mm (4 inch) guns, backed up by two 47 mm anti-aircraft guns, and four 7.62 mm machine guns. The ship carried five twin 457 mm (18 inch) torpedo tubes and had rails for 80 mines. The ship's crew was 125 officers and other ranks. (Note: Watts gives a crew of 160, while Fock claims a crew of 93.)

Bespokoiny was laid down at the Naval Yard's Mykolaiv shipyard on 1 October 1912 (Note: New Style date: 20 September Old Style), launched on 31 October 1913 and was commissioned on 29 October 1914.

== Service ==
When Russia declared war on the Ottoman Empire, the four just-commissioned Naval Yard-built Derzky-class destroyers were the most powerful torpedo craft in the Black Sea, outclassing Turkish destroyers and torpedo boats. They were soon pressed into action, and on the evening of 5 November, Bespokoiny and sister ships Derzki, Gnevny and Pronzitelny laid mines to the north west of the entrance to the Bosphorus. Bespokoiny continued to carry out minelaying operations, as well as attacks against Turkish coastal shipping and shore bombardment duties.

On 23–24 December 1914, Bespokoiny, Derzki, Gnevny and Pronzitelny were supporting operations by the Black Sea Fleet to lay mines and block the port of Zonguldak with blockships. (Zonguldak was the main port for the despatch of coal to Constantinople, which the Russians wanted to stop.) On 24 December the four destroyers clashed with the German light cruiser Breslau, engaging the cruiser with gunfire to allow the Russian cruisers Pamiat Merkuria and Kagul to join in, but as the Russian cruisers approached, Breslau broke off the engagement. (Note: The Russian attack on Zonguldak was a failure, with Breslau sinking two of the blockships on the night of 23/24 December, and the other two being sunk by Turkish coastal artillery.) The four Russian destroyers encountered Breslau again on 25 December, but Breslau escaped again.

On 4 January 1915, the four destroyers and Pamiat Merkuria encountered the Turkish cruiser Hamidiye, but although they hit Hamidiye several times, the Turkish cruiser escaped, while Pronzitelny and Derzki both suffered gun failures. On 15 July 1915, Bespokoiny, Derzki and Pronzitelny bombarded the port of Zonguldak, and the next day sank a steamer and a lighter. On 29 November 1915, the German submarine UC-13 ran aground about 55 nmi (63 mi; 102 km) east of the Bosporus, and was scuttled by the submarine's crew. On 10 December, Bespokoiny, Derzki and Gnevny caught two Turkish gunboats, Taşköprü and Yozgat, which had been sent to salvage material from the wreck of UC-13, and sank them in the Battle of Kirpen Island. On 11 February 1916, Bespokoiny and the destroyer Schastlivy shelled bridges near Trabzon and on 14 February, together with Pronzitelny and the older destroyer Leytenant Shestakov, escorted the battleships Imperatritsa Ekaterina Velikaya and Rostislav from Batum to Sevastapol. On 28 February 1916, Bespokoiny and Pronzitelny shelled Giresun, destroying several sailing ships, and later that day clashed with the German cruiser Breslau. On 14 April, Bespokoiny, Derzki and Pronzitelny operated in support of the Russian offensive against Trabzon, claiming 58 sailing ships carrying supplies to the Turkish army sunk.

On 11 June, Bespokoiny was part of the escort for Imperatritsa Ekaterina Velikaya which was operating off the Lazistan coast when the German submarine U-38 attacked the battleship. U-38's two torpedoes missed Imperatritsa Ekaterina Velikaya, which was zig-zagging, and Bespokoiny and Derzki both counter-attacked, Bespokoiny using hydrophones to direct her attack, while Derzki deployed an explosive sweep, but U-38 escaped undamaged. On 4 July 1916, Bespokoiny and Schastlivy accompanied Imperatritsa Ekaterina Velikaya in an attempt to find the German battlecruiser Goeben and Breslau which had shelled Tuapse and Sochi, but the German ships escaped. On 22 July, Bespokoiny, Schastlivy, Derzki, Gnevny and Pylki accompanied the battleship Imperatritsa Mariya and Kagul in an attempt to intercept Breslau, which intelligence had warned was on a minelaying sortie in the Black Sea. The two forces met later that day, and while Breslau's 150 mm (5.9 in) guns managed to keep the Russian destroyers from closing, a long chase developed, with Breslau receiving damage from near misses by Imperatritsa Mariya's guns. Eventually, Breslau drew away from the Russian force, and the five destroyers were ordered to continue to follow the German ship, and deliver a torpedo attack under cover of darkness. Bespokniny had to break off the pursuit due to mechanical problems, however, and the four remaining destroyers lost contact with Breslau due to a rain storm.

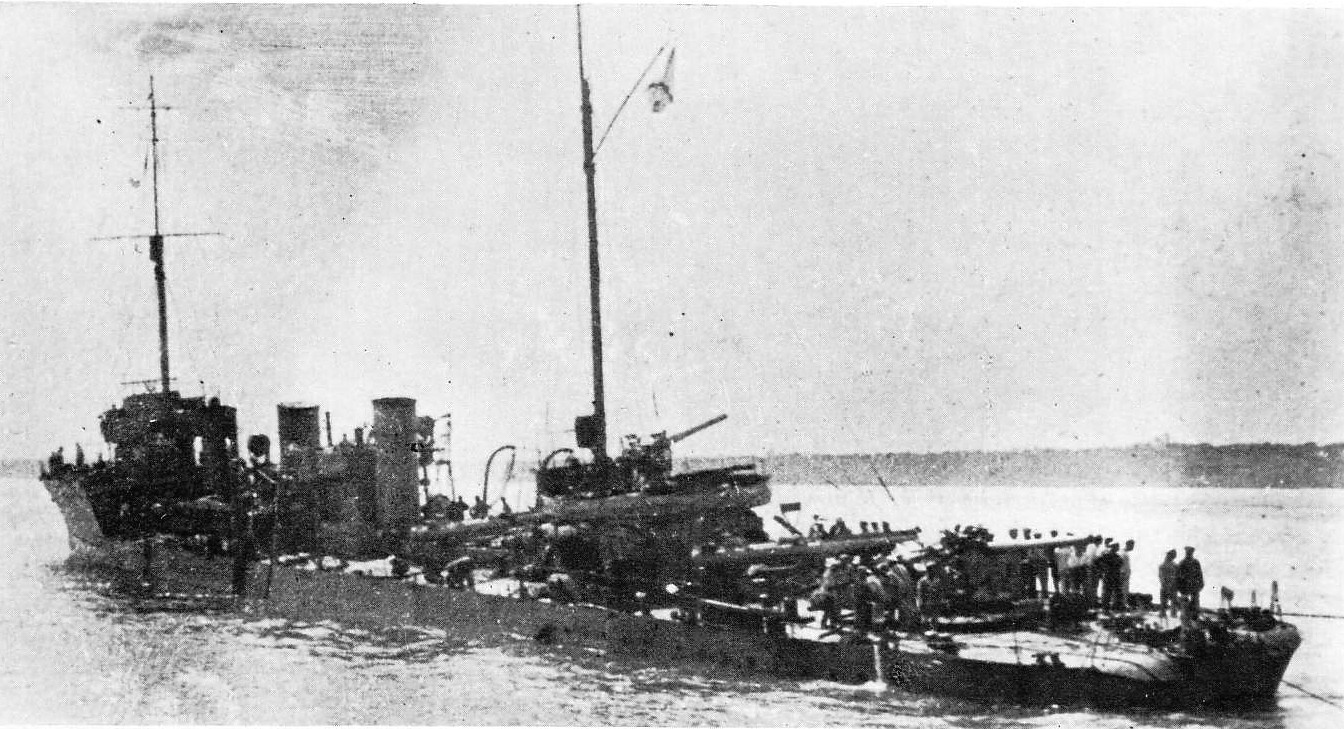
Bespokoiny after mining on 8/9 September 1916

In August 1916, Bespokoiny was busy with minelaying operations, laying mines at the approaches to the Bosporus on the night of 3/4 August (with Derzki, Gnevny and Pronzitelny), on 6/7 August (with Derzki and Pronzitelny), on 8/9 August (with Derzki, Gromki and Pronzitelny) and off the coast of Anatolia on the night of 11 August (with Pronzitelny). On the night of 8/9 September, Bespokoiny, Gnevny and Pronzitelny were ordered to lay mines off the port of Varna, Bulgaria. (Note: Two Bulgarian torpedo boats struck mines from this minefield on 11 September, with Shumni sinking and Strogi being damaged.) On the return trip, Bespokoiny struck two mines near Constanza and was badly damaged. She was towed into Constanza by the minesweeper No. 241 and after temporary repairs, was towed to Mykolaiv for more extensive repair work at the Naval Yard, which continued into 1917.

On 29 December 1917, Bespokoiny came under control of the Bolshevik Black Sea Fleet. While an Armistice between Russia and the Central Powers was signed in December 1917, Germans forces advanced deep into Ukraine following the Treaty of Brest-Litovsk in March 1918, and on 12 May 1918, Bespokoiny left Sevastopol for Novorossiysk with much of the Black Sea Fleet. In June 1918, Germany threatened to attack Novorossiysk if the Black Sea Fleet did not return to Sevastopol where it would be under German control. Although the Bolshevik government had given secret orders that the fleet should be scuttled rather than surrendered to the Germans, the decision was put to a vote by the ships' crews at a public meeting, and Bespokoiny, together with several other destroyers and torpedo boats and the battleship Volya sailed for Sevastopol and internment by the Germans on 18 June. On 1 October 1918, Germany seized control of Bespokoiny and a number of other warships, with the intention of commissioning them into the German Navy, but the end of the war brought a halt to these plans.

On 26 November 1918, an Allied fleet arrived at Sevastopol, and took control of the Black Sea Fleet ships under the terms of the Armistice, with Bespokoiny coming under French control, and being given the pennant number R.1. The ship was moved to İzmir in April 1919, and in September 1919 was transferred to White Russian control as the Russian Civil War continued. In March 1920, Bespokoiny took part in the evacuation of White Russian troops and refugees from Novorossiysk. Following this evacuation, Bespokoiny operated in the Kerch Strait and Sea of Azov, carrying out patrols, escorting food transports and supporting the troops of the Armed Forces of South Russia. On 15 September 1920, she was reported (Note: Zablotsky and Levitsky claim that the incident is mentioned in Soviet sources but not in White Russian accounts.) as being mined in the Kerch Strait, but received little or no damage and continued operations without disruption. On 14 November 1920, Bespokoiny left Sevastopol as part of the final Evacuation of the Crimea, passing via Istanbul to Bizerte where the ship was interned by the French on 29 December 1920. On 29 October 1924, the French government recognised Soviet ownership of the interned ships of Wrangel's fleet, but the ships were not returned and were eventually sold by the Soviets to a French company for scrap, with Bespokoiny being broken up in the early 1930s.
