= Central Executive Committee of the Navy =

Russian Navy governing body, between June and November 1917

The Central Executive Committee of the Navy (Tsentroflot, Centroflot) was the main collegial governing body of the navy, created as part of the democratization of the navy in 1917 in order to coordinate the activities of the committees of the fleets and flotillas.

The Centroflot was formed by the First All-Russian Congress of Soviets of Workers' and Soldiers' Deputies in June 1917 on the basis of delegates of the Maritime Section of the Petrograd Soviet. Most members of the Centroflot were moderate socialists – the Mensheviks and Socialist Revolutionaries. By the fall of 1917, in parallel with the process of Bolshevization of the Soviets, a process of mass Bolshevization of the lower soldier and sailor committees took place (see also Democratization of the Army in Russia).

At the same time, the Bolshevization of the Centroflot, and other soldiers' and sailors' committees of the highest levels was difficult due to the need to organize complex re-elections; in particular, within the framework of "Soviet legality", the Centroflot could only be re-elected by the All-Russian Congress of Soviets.

The result was the formation of a significant gap in the composition; in particular, between the Bolshevik Central Committee of the Baltic Fleet and the Socialist Revolutionary–Menshevik Centroflot. During the October Revolution, the Bolsheviks, at the suggestion of Pavel Dybenko, declared the Centroflot unauthorized in connection with the recall of their representatives by the Baltic Fleet.

On November 9, 1917, the Centroflot was dispersed by the Bolsheviks led by Nikolai Khovrin, and, at the suggestion of Lenin, was replaced by the Naval Revolutionary Committee led by the Bolshevik Ivan Vakhrameev.

The dispersed delegates of the Centroflot sent the following telegram to the fleets:

On October 27, at 17:00, a sailor Khovrin arrived in Centroflot, who announced on behalf of the Naval Military Committee, elected by the Congress of Soviets, about the dissolution of the Centroflot. When asked about the reason, Khovrin replied: "By the right of the strong". Unable to resist brute force, the Сentroflot declared: dissolution was considered illegal. It submitted to brute force and surrendered affairs.

== See also ==
- Central Committee of the Baltic Fleet
- Committee for the Salvation of the Homeland and the Revolution
