= Vakhrameyev =

Vakhrameyev, Vakhrameev, Vahrameev (masculine), Vakhrameyeva, Vakhrameeva, Vahrameeva (feminineine) are transliterations of the Russian surname Вахрамеев / Вахрамеевa. Notable people with the surname include:

- Alexander Vakhrameyev, Russian artist
- Dmitry Vakhrameev, musician of Russian band Kukuruza
- Ivan Vakhrameev (1885 – 1965) Russian navy sailor and revolutionary
- Ivan Vakhrameev (general) (1904—1976), Soviet Major General
- Mikhail Vakhrameev, Hero of the Soviet Union
