= Nikolai Khovrin =

Russian and Soviet military leader

Nikolai Aleksandrovich Khovrin (Russian: Николай Александрович Ховрин; 1891–1972) was a Russian and Soviet military leader who headed Baltic sailor formations during the October Revolution.

== Life and career ==
Born on 7 October 1891 in Saint Petersburg, since 1912 Khovrin served in the Baltic Fleet, and he was a member of the Russian Social Democratic Labour Party since 1915.

In 1917 he participated in the February Revolution and was a member of the Bolsheviks Helsingfors Committee, one of founders and a member of the Central Committee of the Baltic Fleet (Tsentrobalt). During the October Revolution, Khovrin was a commissar of the Tsentrobalt, participated in the assault of the Winter Palace, destroying the Kerensky–Krasnov uprising, and was a member of the 2nd All-Russian Congress of Soviets. On 13 November 1917 he led his sailors to crush anti-Bolshevik resistance in Moscow.

In 1918 Khovrin was appointed a commander of the Petrograd Naval Base and participated in Soviet invasion of Ukraine as part of the Ukrainian-Soviet War and eventually he was appointed a commander of the Kerch Naval Base.

After the Russian Civil War, Khovrin served at the EPRON, the People's Commissariat of Navy and the Soviet Army. He was a veteran of World War II. In 1951 Khovrin retired and lived in Kiev before his death in 1972.

== Bibliography ==
- Khovrin, N.A. Baltic sailors assault! Moscow: "Voyenizdat", 1987.
