= Battle of Kirpen Island =

Minor World War I naval battle at the mouth of Sakarya river in Turkey in 1915

- Part of World War I
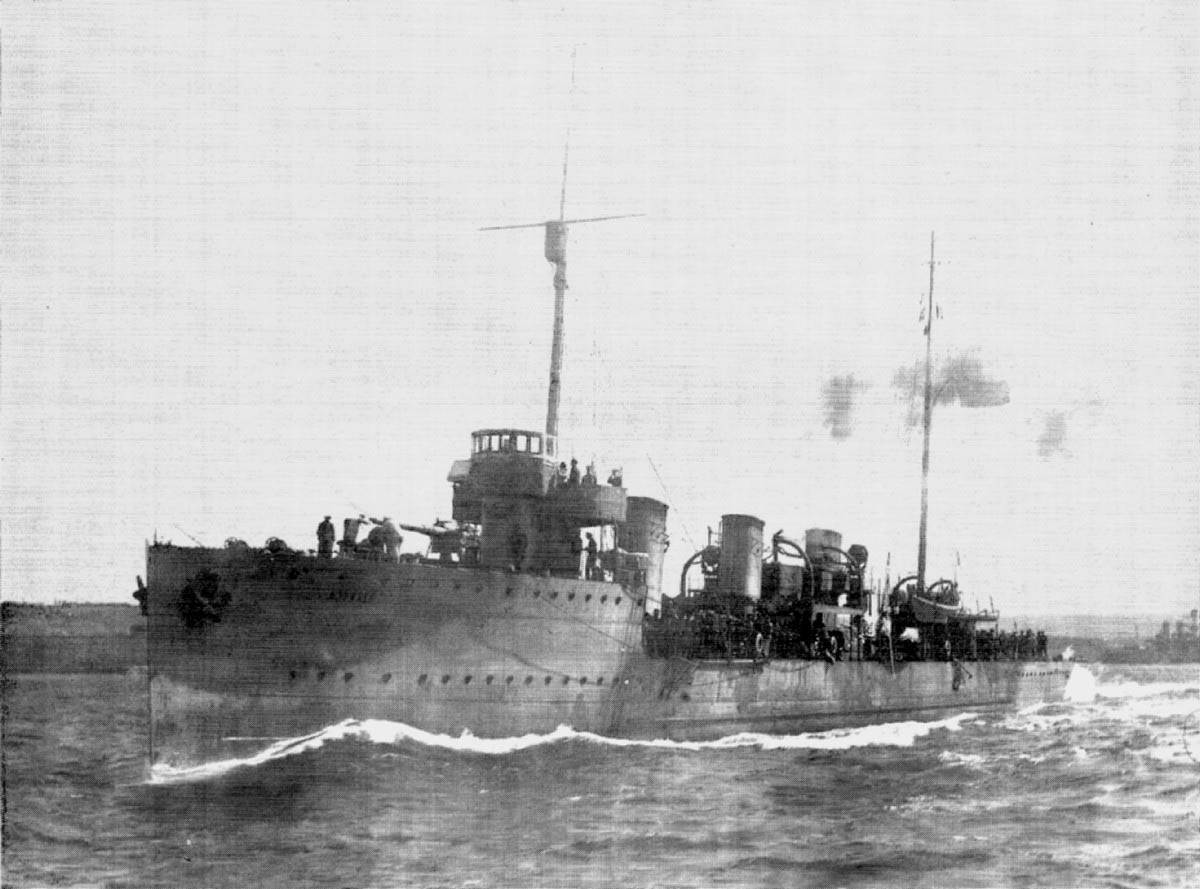
- The Russian destroyer Derzky in the Black Sea
Date	10 December 1915
Location	off Kefken Island, Ottoman Empire, Black Sea
Result	Russian victory

Belligerents
Russian Empire	Ottoman Empire

Strength
3 destroyers	2 gunboats

Casualties and losses
Unknown	2 gunboats sunk

The Battle of Kirpen Island was a small naval battle fought during the Black Sea campaign of World War I. On 29 November 1915 the German U-boat SM UC-13 was shadowing five Russian merchant ships when she ran aground off the mouth of the Sakarya River in poor weather. Admiral Wilhelm Souchon, the German commander of the Ottoman Navy sent two gunboats to recover the wreck. During the following cruise, the three Russian Derzky-class destroyers Derzky, Gnevny and Bespokoiny encountered the gunboats Taşköprü and Yozgat. In the ensuing combat the Russian gunners fired accurately and quickly sank both of the gunboats off Kefken Island on 10 December 1915.

== Order of battle ==
Ottoman Navy:

- Taşköprü, gunboat
- Yozgat, gunboat

Russian Navy:

- Derzky, destroyer
- Gnevny, destroyer
- Bespokoiny, destroyer
