= Wrangel's fleet =

Remnant of Imperial Russian Black Sea Fleet

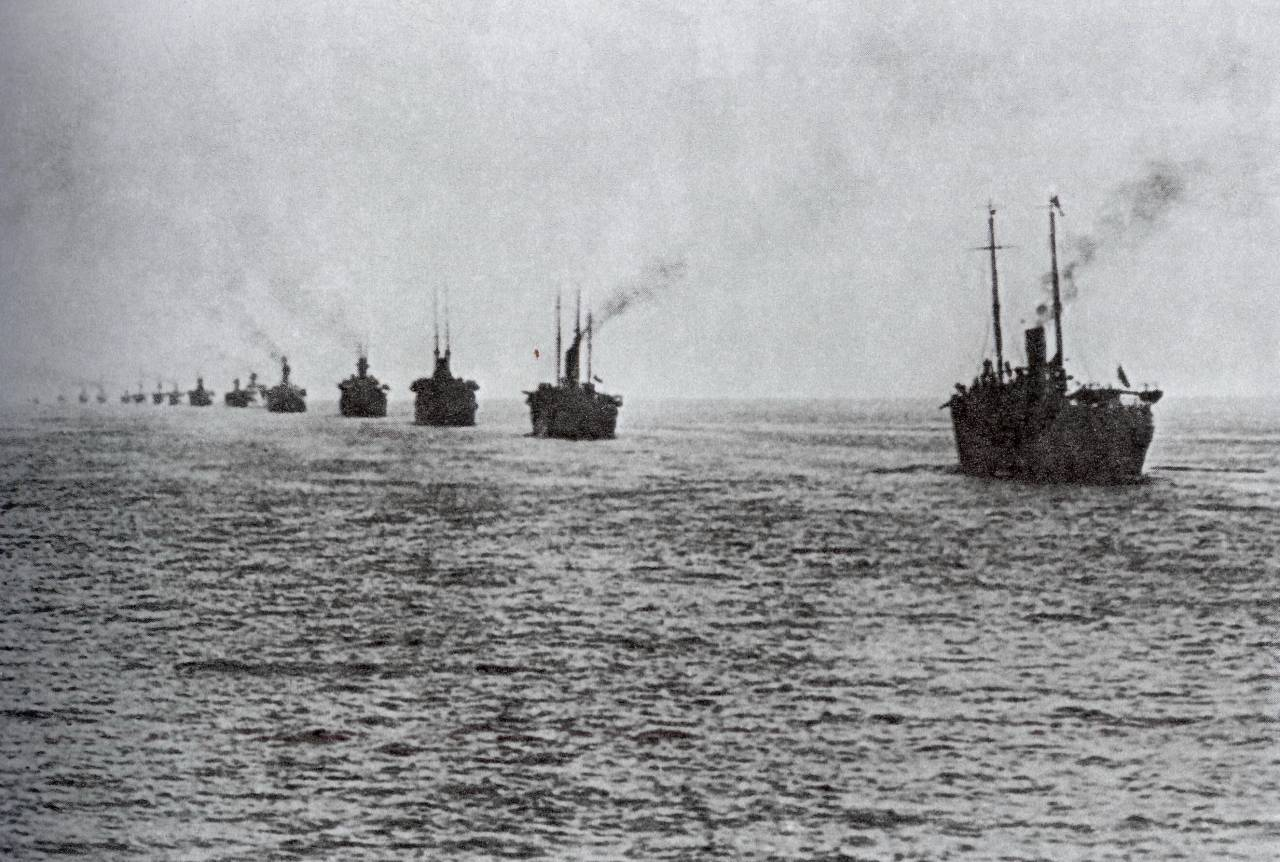
The White Army being evacuated from the Crimea

Wrangel's fleet was the last remnant of the Black Sea Fleet of the Imperial Russian Navy and existed from 1920 until 1924. This squadron was a White (anti-Bolshevik) unit during the Russian Civil War. It was known also as the Russian Squadron (Русская Эскадра).

== History ==
By the end of October 1920, the White Army had been driven out of Southern Russia and Ukraine, and only held the Crimean Peninsula, defended behind the narrow Perekop Isthmus. When this last defensive line was breached by the Red Army during the Siege of Perekop, the commander of the White Army, Pyotr Wrangel, decided to evacuate. The operation had been preliminarily worked out and planned by General Wrangel's staff, so its implementation was carried out in good order.

During the evacuation from the ports of the Crimean peninsula (Sevastopol, Yevpatoria, Kerch, Feodosia, Yalta) a total of 145,693 soldiers and civilians, not counting the crews, were taken on board on 126 ships and "sudenosheks" (small boats and tugs).

This fleet, known as Wrangel's fleet and composed of ships of the Whites' Black Sea fleet, foreign ships, and the temporarily mobilized ships of the Voluntary Fleet, first sailed to Entente-occupied Constantinople. A significant number of the passengers left the ships here, replenishing the ranks of White Russian emigres. Between December 8, 1920, and February 1921, the reduced flotilla sailed to the Tunisian port of Bizerte.

The soldiers and civilians who were left behind in the Crimea suffered under the Red Terror organised by Béla Kun and Rosalia Zemlyachka, under the general management of the representative of the Russian Soviet government, Yuri Pyatakov, and authorised by Vladimir Lenin.

The estimated number of executions vary from minimum 12,000 over 50,000 to 120,000. The White Army soldiers had been falsely promised amnesty if they surrendered.

The French government recognized the Soviet Union in 1924 and gave ownership of the ships to the Soviets. A technical commission directed by Alexei Krylov arrived in Bizerte in December and found the warships unrepairable. The ships were sold as scrap metal by the Soviet government in Bizerte. Many of the sailors of the fleet settled in France as White Emigres.

== Composition of the Russian Squadron ==
- Battleships
  - General Alekseyev
  - Georgii Pobedonosets
- Cruisers
  - General Kornilov
  - Almaz
- Destroyers
  - Kapitan Saken
  - Bespokoiny
  - Derzky
  - Gnevny
  - Pylki
  - Pospeshny
  - Schastlivy (grounded 24 October 1919 while being towed to internment)
  - Tserigo
  - Zharkiy
  - Zhivoi (sank on 16 November 1920)
  - Zvonkiy
  - Zorkiy
- Submarines
  - Tyulen
  - Burevestnik
  - AG 22
  - Utka
- Gunboats
  - Vsadnik
  - Dzhigit
  - Gaidamak
  - Strazh
  - Grozny
