= Ivan Vakhrameev =

Ivan Ivanovich Vakhrameev
- Иван Иванович Вахрамеев
- Born: October 3, 1885; Yaroslavl, Russian Empire
- Died: July 20, 1965 (aged 79); Leningrad, Soviet Union
- Military career
- Allegiance: Russian Empire; Soviet Russia; Soviet Union
- Branch: Fleet
- Rank: Colonel
- Conflicts: World War I; Russian Civil War; Kerensky–Krasnov Uprising; North Russia intervention; World War II; Eastern Front
- Awards: Order of Lenin; Order of the Red Banner; Order of the Red Star; Medal "For the Victory over Germany in the Great Patriotic War 1941–1945"

Ivan Ivanovich Vakhrameev (1885 – 1965) was a Russian revolutionary. Member of the World War I, Russian Civil War and World War II. After the October Revolution, he held a number of responsible posts, then switched to teaching. Colonel of the quartermaster service.

== Biography ==
Ivan Ivanovich Vakhrameev was born in 1885 in Yaroslavl. His father was a petty employee. Received a secondary technical education.

From 1908 to 1911 he served in the Baltic Fleet, but in 1914, after the outbreak of World War I, he was again called up for the fleet. He was a machine non-commissioned officer in submarines. In the first months of 1916, Ivan Ivanovich, together with a group of Bolshevik sailors, was arrested, but was soon released due to lack of evidence. In 1917, formally became part of the Russian Social Democratic Labour Party (Bolsheviks). After formally joining the party, he held a number of elected posts in sailor committees, and served as chairman of the judicial committee and submarine division.

After the October Revolution, he served in the Red Fleet, took part in the suppression of the Kerensky–Krasnov Uprising in Petrograd, which lasted from October 26 to October 31, 1917. From October 25 to 27 was a member of the Second All-Russian Congress of Soviets of Workers' and Soldiers' Deputies. He also served as chairman of the Naval Revolutionary Committee and head of the military-political department of the Supreme Maritime College. On April 10, 1918, he was appointed Deputy People's Commissar for Maritime Affairs of the Russian Socialist Federative Soviet Republic. On June 18, 1918, he took part in the flooding of the Black Sea Fleet in the Tsemes Bay, and served as chairman of the Defense Council of the Arkhangelsk Region. He was one of the leaders of the Struggle of the Red Army Against the Army of the British Empire in Northern Russia. In the fall of 1918, the Revolutionary Military Council of the Republic appointed Vakhrameev to the following posts: Fleet Supply Commissioner, Assistant Manager of the Maritime Commissariat, Representative of the Maritime Department at the Ural factories and Head of the Admiralty of the Sevastopol Port.

In 1925, he was appointed head of the economic department of the Kronstadt port. In the late 1920s and early 1930s he was in the 10th job category, which equated to the position of commander of a land brigade. He served in naval educational institutions.

He took part in the Great Patriotic War. He received the rank of colonel. In 1949 he retired. He died in 1965. He was buried in Saint Petersburg at the Red Cemetery.

== Appraisal ==
unhurried, confident, weighing his words and deeds, we liked Vakhrameev for his efficiency, ability to thoroughly solve issues.

— Nikolay Khovrin

== Awards ==
During the Great Patriotic War, Ivan Ivanovich Vakhromeev was awarded the following awards:

- Order of Lenin (February 21, 1945);
- Order of the Red Banner (November 3, 1944);
- Order of the Red Star (July 24, 1943);
- Medal "For the Victory over Germany in the Great Patriotic War 1941–1945".

== Sources ==
- Civil War and Military Intervention in the Soviet Union: Encyclopedia / Editor-in-Chief Semyon Khromov – Moscow: Soviet Encyclopedia, 1983 – Page 87 – 702 pages – 150,000 Сopies
- Kirill Nazarenko (2011). Fleet, Revolution and Power in Russia: 1917–1921. Quadriga. ISBN 9785457931022.
- Anatoly Mordvinov (8 February 2018). From the Experience. Memoirs of the Adjutant Wing of Emperor Nicholas II. Vol. 2.
- Vakhromeev Ivan Ivanovich // Brasos – Vesh – Moscow: Soviet Encyclopedia, 1971 – (Great Soviet Encyclopedia: in 30 Volumes / Editor-in-Chief Alexander Prokhorov; 1969–1978, Volume 4)
- Jacob Balagurov, Mikhail Kiuru (1974). Essays on the History of the Karelian Organization of the Communist Party of the Soviet Union. Karelia. p. 538.
- Ivan Isakov (1984). Sea Attraction: Stories. Military Publishing House. p. 121.
- George Golikov, M. Kuznetsov (1977). The Great October Socialist Revolution. Encyclopedia. Soviet Encyclopedia. p. 82. ISBN 9788424144579.
- Yuri Piryutko, Alexander Kobak (5 September 2017). Historical Cemeteries of Saint Petersburg. Litres. ISBN 978-5457041370.
- Ivan Isakov (1962). Navy Tales. Military Publishing House. p. 42.
