= Central Committee of the Baltic Fleet =

The Central Committee of the Baltic Fleet (Tsentrobalt) Russian: Центральный комитет Балтийского флота (ЦКБФ, Центробалт) was a committee for coordination of the activities of sailors' committees of the Russian Baltic Fleet. It was established on 11–13 May (28–30 April, Old Style) 1917, after the February Revolution. Its first chairman was Pavel Dybenko. In December the office of the Baltic Fleet Commander-in-Chief and his staff were abolished, and Tsentrobalt assumed the full power over the Fleet. In January 1918, the 5th convocation of Tsentrobalt was under the domination of the Anarchists. Tsentrobalt was abolished on February 13 (January 31 O.S.) 1918 due to the introduction of a new structure: Baltic Fleet Council of Commissars.
