= Russian battleship Imperator Aleksandr III =

Imperatritsa Mariya-class dreadnought

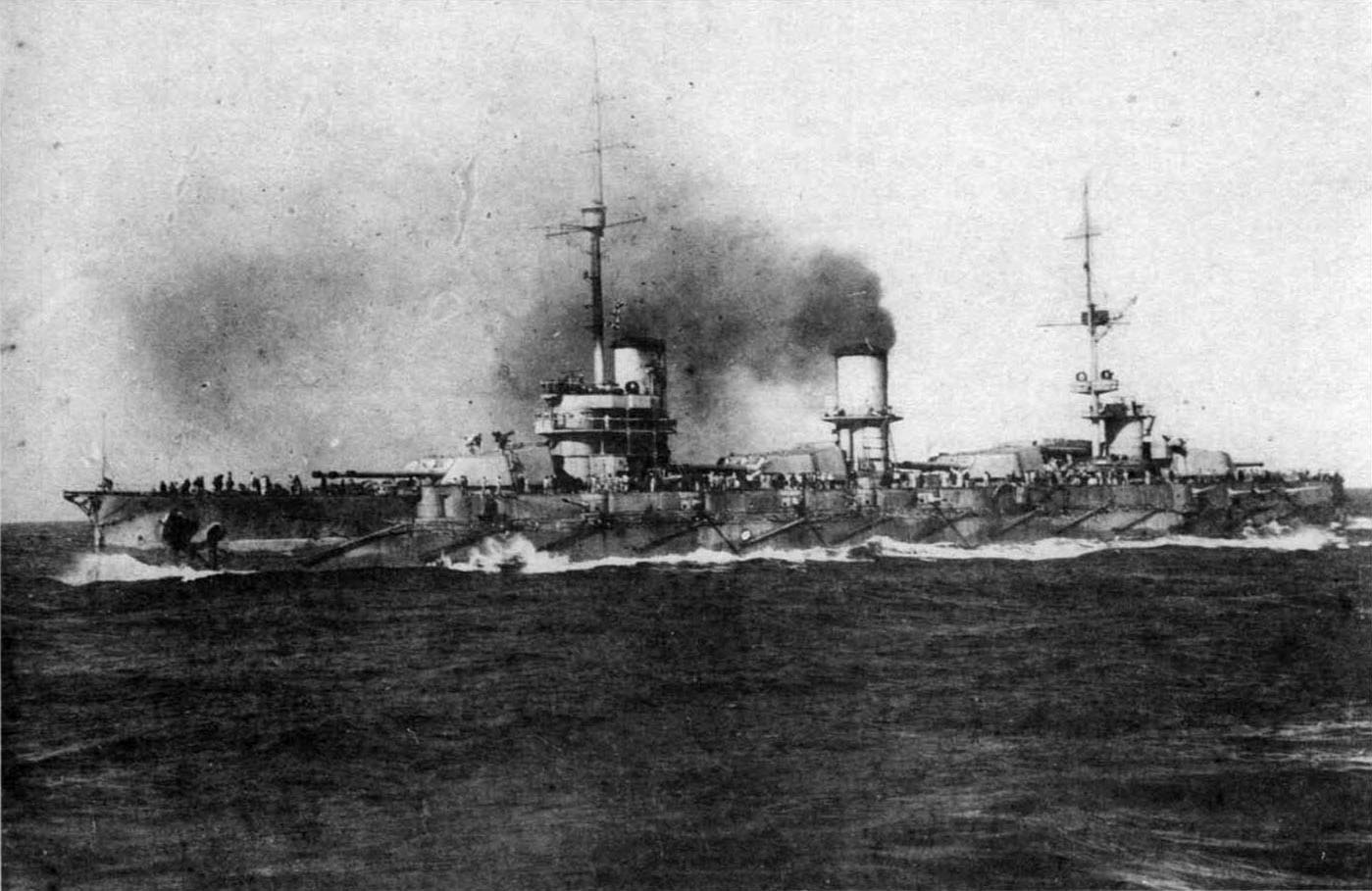
- Volia at sea

History

Imperial Russia and the Russian Provisional Government
- Name: Imperator Aleksandr III
- Namesake: Tsar Alexander III of Russia
- Operator: Imperial Russian Navy
- Ordered: 13 April 1912 (Note: All dates used in this article are New Style)
- Builder: Russud Shipyard, Nikolayev
- Cost: 27,659,000 gold rubles
- Laid down: 30 October 1911
- Launched: 15 April 1914
- In service: 17 July 1917
- Renamed: Volia (Russian: Воля, Freedom) on 29 April 1917
- Fate: Ship taken over by the Bolsheviks following the start of the October Revolution in November 1917.

Russian SFSR
- Name: Volia (Russian: Воля, Freedom)
- Operator: Red Fleet
- Acquired: Taken from the Russian Provisional Government in November 1917
- Fate: Turned over to Imperial Germany on 19 June 1918 as part of the terms of the Treaty of Brest-Litovsk.

Imperial Germany
- Name: Volia (Russian: Воля, Freedom)
- Operator: Kaiserliche Marine
- Acquired: From the Red Fleet on 19 June 1918
- Fate: Turned over to the British Empire on 24 November 1918 as part of the terms of the Peace of Compiègne.

British Empire
- Name: Volia (Russian: Воля, Freedom)
- Operator: Royal Navy
- Acquired: From Imperial Germany on 24 November 1918
- Fate: Returned to the White Army on 1 November 1919. Renamed General Alekseyev.

White Army
- Name: General Alekseyev
- Namesake: Mikhail Alekseyev
- Operator: Wrangel's Fleet (part of the White Army in Southern Russia)
- Acquired: From the British Empire on 1 November 1919
- Out of service: 29 December 1920
- Fate: Remained docked in Bizerte, French Tunisia, until 1936. Scrapped by the French to pay for her docking fees

General characteristics
- Class & type: Imperatritsa Mariya-class battleship
- Displacement: 23,413 long tons (23,789 t)
- Length: 168 m (551 ft 2 in)
- Beam: 27.43 m (90 ft)
- Draft: 8.36 m (27 ft 5 in)
- Installed power: 20 Yarrow boilers; 26,000 shp (19,000 kW)
- Propulsion: 4 shafts; 4 geared steam turbines
- Speed: 21 knots (39 km/h; 24 mph)
- Range: 1,640 nautical miles (3,037 km; 1,887 mi) at 21 knots (39 km/h; 24 mph)
- Complement: 1,154
- Armament: 4 × triple 12-inch (305 mm) guns; 18 × single 130 mm (5.1 in) guns; 4 × single 76.2 mm (3 in) AA guns; 4 × 17.7 in (450 mm) submerged torpedo tubes
- Armor: Waterline belt: 125–262.5 mm (4.92–10.33 in); Deck: 9–50 mm (0.35–1.97 in); Gun turrets: 250 mm (9.8 in); Barbettes: 250 mm (9.8 in); Conning tower: 300 mm (11.8 in)

Imperator Aleksandr III (Emperor Alexander III) was the third and last ship of the Imperatritsa Mariya-class dreadnoughts of the Imperial Russian Navy. She was begun before World War I, completed during the war and saw service with the Black Sea Fleet. She was renamed Volia or Volya (Russian: Вóля, Freedom) before her completion and then General Alekseyev (Генерал Алексеев) in 1920. The ship was delivered in 1917, but the disruptions of the February Revolution rendered the Black Sea Fleet ineffective and she saw no combat.

Volia was surrendered to the Germans in 1918 who briefly commissioned her, but they were forced to turn her over to the British by the terms of the Armistice. The British then turned her over to the White Russians in 1919 and they used her to help evacuate the Crimea in 1920. She was interned in Bizerte, French Tunisia, by the French and ultimately scrapped by them in 1936 to pay her docking fees. Her guns were put into storage and were later used by the Germans and Finns for coastal artillery during World War II. Both countries continued to use them throughout the Cold War.

== Description ==
Imperator Aleksandr III was 168 meters (551 ft) long at the waterline. She had a beam of 27.43 meters (90.0 ft) and a draft of 8.36 meters (27.4 ft). Her displacement was 23,600 tonnes (23,200 long tons; 26,000 short tons) at load, 1,000 t (980 long tons; 1,100 short tons) more than her designed displacement of 22,600 t (22,200 long tons; 24,900 short tons). Her sister Imperatritsa Mariya had proved to be very bow heavy in service and tended to ship large amounts of water through her forward casemates; Imperator Aleksandr III's forward pair of 130 mm guns were removed before she was completed in an attempt to compensate for her trim.

Imperator Aleksandr III was fitted with four Parsons-type steam turbines imported from John Brown & Company of the United Kingdom. They were designed for a total of 26,000 shaft horsepower (19,000 kW), but produced 27,270 shp (20,340 kW) on trials. 20 mixed-firing triangular Yarrow water-tube boilers powered the turbines with a working pressure of 17.5 atm (257 psi). Her designed speed was 21 knots (39 km/h; 24 mph). Her maximum coal capacity was 1,700 long tons (1,727 t) plus 500 t (490 long tons; 550 short tons) of fuel oil which gave her a range of 1,640 nautical miles (3,040 km; 1,890 mi) at 21 knots (39 km/h; 24 mph). All of her electrical power was generated by three Curtis 360 kW (480 hp) main turbo generators and two 200 kW (270 hp) auxiliary units.

The ship's main armament consisted of a dozen Obukhovskii 12-inch (305 mm) Pattern 1907 guns mounted in four triple turrets distributed the length of the ship. Her secondary armament consisted of eighteen 130-millimeter (5.1 in) B7 Pattern 1913 guns mounted in casemates. They were arranged in two groups, five guns per side from the forward turret to the rear funnel and the remaining four clustered around the rear turret. She was fitted with four 76.2-millimeter (3 in) 'Lender' anti-aircraft guns, two each mounted on the roof of the fore and aft turrets. Four 17.7-inch (450 mm) submerged torpedo tubes were mounted, two tubes on each broadside abaft the forward magazine.

== Construction and career ==
Imperator Aleksandr III was built by the Russud Shipyard at Nikolayev. She was laid down on 30 October 1911, but this was just a ceremonial event as her design had not yet been finalized or the contract signed. She suffered from a number of delays during construction. First the method of fastening the armour to its supports was changed and the armour plates were locked together by a type of mortise and tenon joint to better distribute the shock of an impact based on the full-scale armour trials conducted using the hulk of the old pre-dreadnought battleship Chesma in 1913. This added almost 500 long tons (508 t) of weight to the ship and raised her cost by 220,000 rubles. Then her priority was reduced after the start of World War I to concentrate efforts on her more advanced sister ships to complete them more quickly. She was not expected to be finished before 1916, but her British-built turbines were also delayed. Imperator Aleksandr III was launched on 15 April 1914, but did not arrive at Sevastopol for fitting out until 17 July 1917, by which time the ship had been renamed Volia (Russian: Воля, Freedom). She conducted her sea trials over the next several months. By this time the Black Sea Fleet was totally ineffective as a result of the political situation after the February Revolution and Volia did not see any combat.

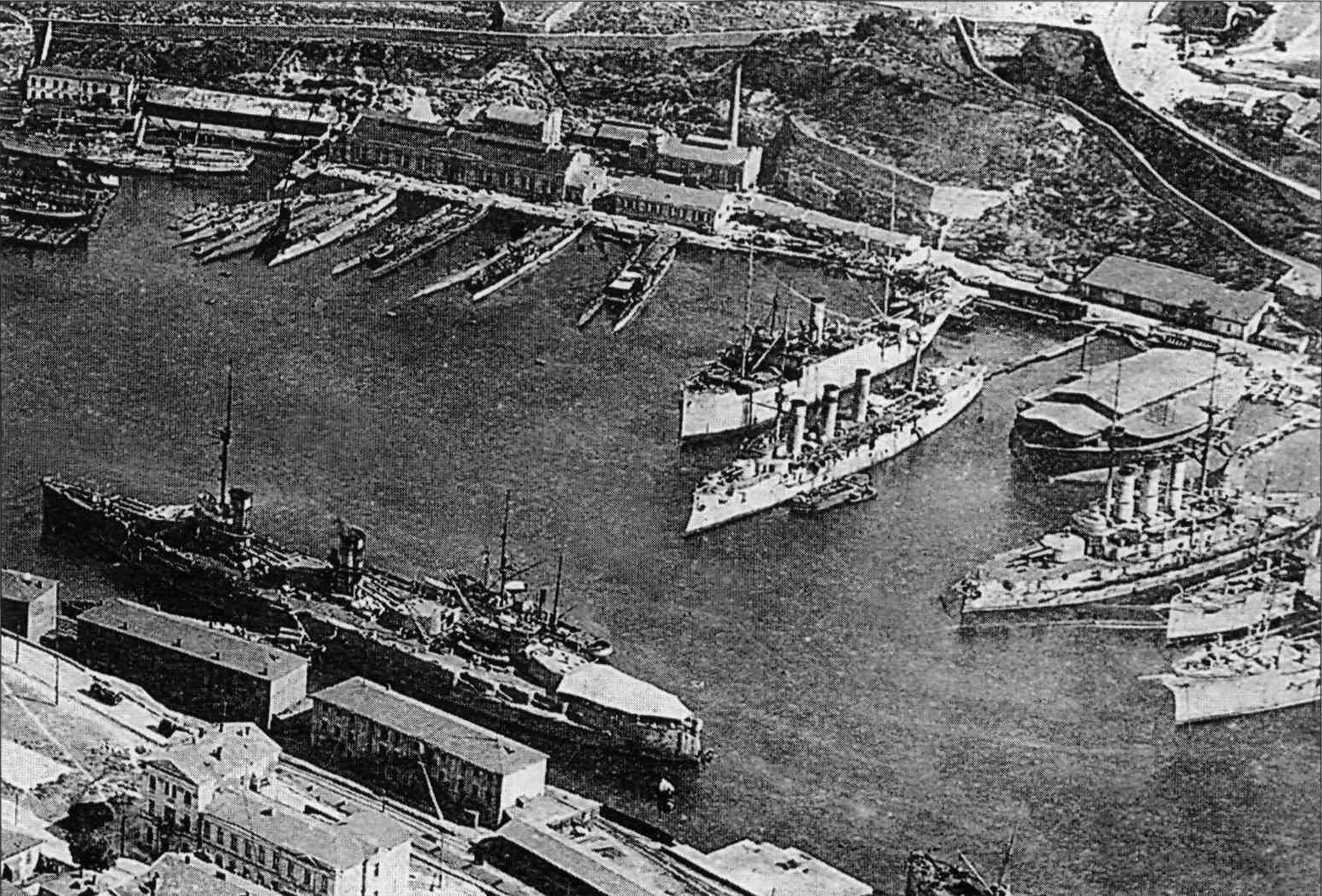
Volia in Sevastopol with several other Russian warships, including the cruiser Pamiat' Merkuria, and battleship Evstafi, August 1918

Volia sailed from Sevastopol to Novorossiysk on 1 May 1918 to avoid capture by advancing German troops. While at Novorossiysk she received an order to scuttle on 19 June 1918, but the majority of the crew (933 versus 640) voted not to do so and they decided to return to Sevastopol. Upon arrival she was disarmed and only guards were left on board, but the Germans took control on 1 October. On 15 October she was commissioned into the Imperial German Navy and manned by the crew of the decommissioned dreadnought Rheinland. She made some brief cruises with a German crew and by November was ready to begin sea and gunnery trials. However, because of the German Revolution, all further training was cancelled on 6 November. Less than a month later the Germans were forced to turn her over to the British on 24 November in accordance with the Armistice when a party from the light cruiser HMS Canterbury took charge of her. A month later she was sailed for the port of İzmit, on the Sea of Marmara, by a crew from the pre-dreadnought HMS Agamemnon, which also escorted her.

On 29 October 1919 she was sailed back to Sevastopol by a crew from the battleship HMS Iron Duke and turned over to the White Russians on 1 November. They renamed her General Alekseyev and carried out shore bombardments with only three of her of twelve guns operable. With the collapse of the White Russian armies in Southern Russia in 1920, the ship helped to evacuate the Whites from the Crimea to Bizerte, where she was interned with the rest of Wrangel's fleet. Negotiations to sell her to the Soviet Union fell through and she was sold for scrap in the late 1920s to pay her docking costs although she was not actually broken up until 1936.

The ship's guns were placed into storage in Bizerte. In January 1940 France gave them to Finland, after refusing to sell seven to the Finns in the summer of 1939. Of the twelve main guns, eight made it to Finland, while four were seized by Germany when it invaded Norway in April 1940 and captured them on board SS Nina in Narvik harbor. The Germans emplaced all four guns, after rebuilding them to accept German ammunition, in armoured turrets in Batterie Mirus on Guernsey. The Finns used four guns in coastal artillery positions at Isosaari and Mäkiluoto. Two other guns were used to repair Soviet TM-3-12 railway guns abandoned at Hanko when the Soviets evacuated in 1941. After the war, these were handed over to the Soviet Union, where they were kept operational until the 1990s. The remaining two guns were kept as spares for the others, one of which was used to replace one gun damaged during tests with 'super charges' in the 1970s. One gun turret is now a memorial at Isosaari while the remaining spare barrel was preserved at the Finnish Coast Artillery Museum at Kuivasaari, which was subsequently moved to Suomenlinna.

Nina also carried some of General Alekseyev's 13 cm guns. Several of these were used at the fort at Tangane on the island of Rugsundøy. They engaged the British light cruiser HMS Kenya, reportedly scoring one hit on the cruiser, during Operation Archery in 1941, but saw no other combat during the war.

== Bibliography ==
- Budzbon, Przemysław (1985). "Russia". In Gray, Randal (ed.). Conway's All the World's Fighting Ships 1906–1921. Annapolis, Maryland: Naval Institute Press. pp. 291–325. ISBN 0-85177-245-5.
- McLaughlin, Stephen (2003). Russian & Soviet Battleships. Annapolis, Maryland: Naval Institute Press. ISBN 1-55750-481-4.
- Nottlemann, Dirk (2020). "From Ironclads to Dreadnoughts: The Development of the German Navy 1864–1918, Part XB". Warship International. LVII (1): 49–55. ISSN 0043-0374.
- Vinogradov, Sergei (2021). "Refugee Battleship". In Jordan, John (ed.). Warship 2021. Oxford: Osprey Publishing. pp. 183–187. ISBN 978-1-4728-4779-9.
- Vinogradov, Sergei (2023). "The Strange Fate of the General Alekseev's Guns". In Jordan, John (ed.). Warship 2023. Oxford: Osprey Publishing. pp. 128–141. ISBN 978-1-4728-5713-2.
- Wright, C. C. & Smyers, Richard Paul (1988). "Question 41/87". Warship International. XXV (3): 318–321. ISSN 0043-0374.
