= Soviet cruiser Komintern =

Imperial Russian Navy's Bogatyr-class protected cruiser

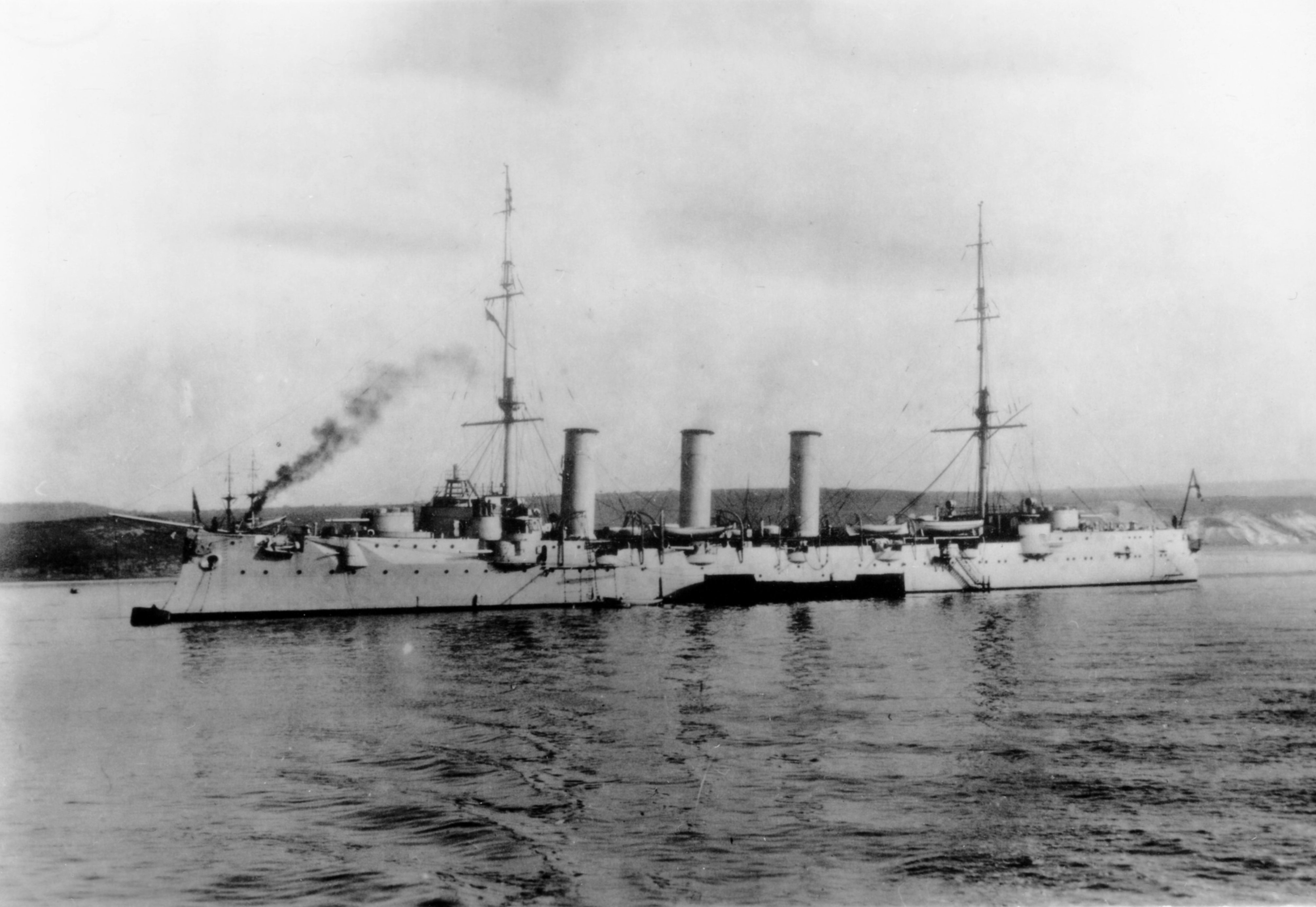
- Pamyat' Merkuria

History

Russian Empire
- Name: Pamiat' Merkuria
- Namesake: Brig Mercury
- Builder: Admiralty Wharf, Nikolayev, Russian Empire
- Laid down: 23 August 1901
- Launched: 20 May 1902
- Commissioned: 1905
- Fate: Ship's crew pledged its allegiance to the Ukrainian People's Republic

Ukrainian People's Republic
- Name: Pamiat' Merkuria (1917); Hetman Ivan Mazepa (1918)
- Acquired: 12 November 1917
- Fate: Integrated into the Soviet Navy

Soviet Union
- Name: Komintern
- Namesake: Communist International
- Acquired: 1920
- Commissioned: June 1923
- Decommissioned: 17 July 1942
- Fate: Sunk as breakwater, late 1942

General characteristics (as built)
- Class & type: Bogatyr-class protected cruiser
- Displacement: 6,645 long tons (6,752 t)
- Length: 134 m (439 ft 8 in)
- Beam: 16.6 m (54 ft 6 in)
- Draught: 6.3 m (20 ft 8 in)
- Installed power: 16 Normand boilers; 23,000 shp (17,000 kW)
- Propulsion: 2 shafts; 2 triple-expansion steam engines
- Speed: 23 knots (43 km/h; 26 mph)
- Complement: 589
- Armament: 2 × twin, 8 × single 6 in (152 mm) guns; 12 × single 75 mm (3.0 in) guns; 8 × single 47 mm (1.9 in) guns; 2 × single 37 mm (1.5 in) guns; 2 × 15 in (380 mm) torpedo tubes
- Armour: Deck: 80 mm (3.1 in); Turrets: 127 mm (5.0 in); Casemates: 80 mm (3.1 in); Conning tower: 140 mm (5.5 in)

General characteristics (after 1920s repair)
- Type: Light cruiser
- Displacement: 6,340 long tons (6,440 t)
- Length: 134.9 m (442 ft 7 in)
- Beam: 16.4 m (53 ft 10 in)
- Draft: 6.8 m (22 ft 4 in)
- Installed power: 16 Belleville boilers; 19,500 shp (14,500 kW)
- Range: 2,100 nmi (3,900 km; 2,400 mi) at 12 knots (22 km/h; 14 mph)
- Complement: 730
- Armament: Initial; 12 × 1, 2 × 2 – 130 mm (5.1 in) guns; 2 × 3 – 457 mm (18.0 in) torpedo tubes; 1930 refit; 10 × 1 – 130 mm (5.1 in) guns; 4 × 1 – 75 mm (3.0 in) guns; Autumn 1941; 6 × 1 – 130 mm (5.1 in) guns; 4 × 1 – 76.2 mm (3.00 in) AA guns; 3 × 1 - 25 mm (0.98 in) AA guns; 195 × naval mines
- Armor: Deck: 76 mm (3.0 in); Casemates: 76 mm (3.0 in); Conning tower: 152 mm (6.0 in)

Komintern was a Soviet light cruiser originally named Pamiat' Merkuria (Memory of Mercury), a Bogatyr-class protected cruiser built for the Imperial Russian Navy. She saw service during World War I in the Black Sea and survived the Russian Civil War, although heavily damaged. She was repaired by the Soviet Navy and put into service as a training ship. In 1941 she was reclassified as a minelayer and provided naval gunfire support and transported troops during the sieges of Odessa, Sevastopol, and the Kerch–Feodosiya operation in the winter of 1941–1942. She was damaged beyond repair at Poti by a German air attack on 16 July 1942. Afterwards she was disarmed and hulked. At some point she was towed to the mouth of the Khobi river and sunk there as a breakwater on 10 October 1942.

== Description ==
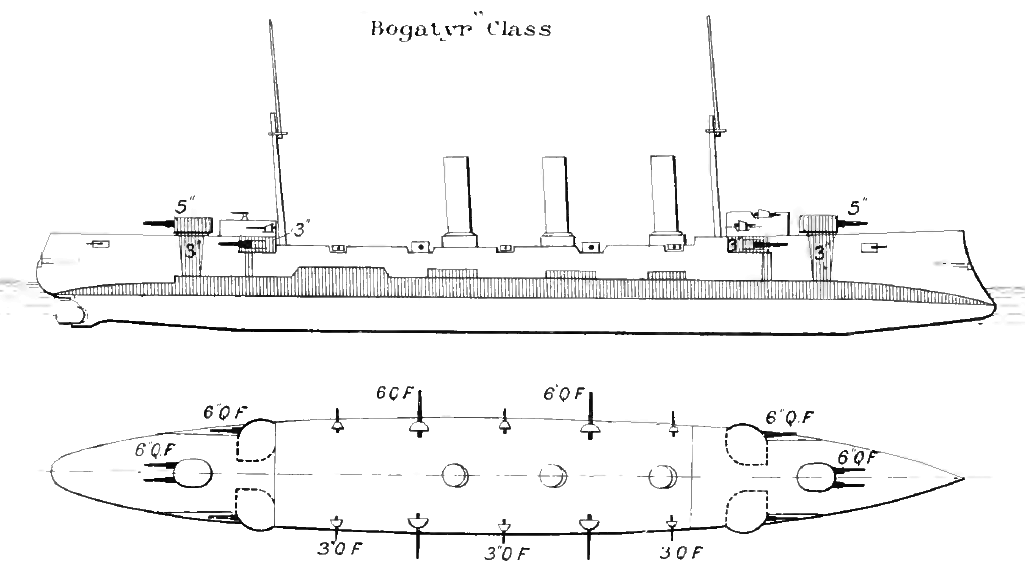
Line drawing of the Bogatyr class showing armament layout

Komintern normally displaced 6,340 long tons (6,440 t). The ship had an overall length of 134.9 metres (442 ft 7 in), a beam of 16.4 metres (53 ft 10 in) and a mean draft of about 6.8 metres (22 ft 4 in). She was powered by two vertical triple-expansion steam engines, each driving one shaft, which developed a total of 19,500 shaft horsepower (14,500 kW) and gave a maximum speed of 23 knots (43 km/h; 26 mph). The engines were powered by 16 coal-fired Belleville boilers. The ship had a range of 2,100 nautical miles (3,900 km; 2,400 mi) at a speed of 12 knots (22 km/h; 14 mph). Komintern's crew consisted of 573 officers and men.

The ship was rearmed during World War I with fourteen 55-caliber 130 mm (5.1 in) B7 Pattern 1913 guns in single mounts, four of which were positioned in casemates. Her anti-aircraft armament consisted of two 75-millimeter (3 in) guns. She also mounted six submerged 457-millimeter (18 in) torpedo tubes, three on each broadside.

Komintern's armored deck and her casemates were 76 mm thick. The armor of the conning tower was 152 millimeters (6 in) thick.

== Service history ==
Pamiat' Merkuria was originally named Kagul and did not receive her name until 25 March 1907. This has caused much confusion between her and her sister Ochakov regarding construction data. Some of the data presented here is taken from Russian-language sources.

=== World War I ===
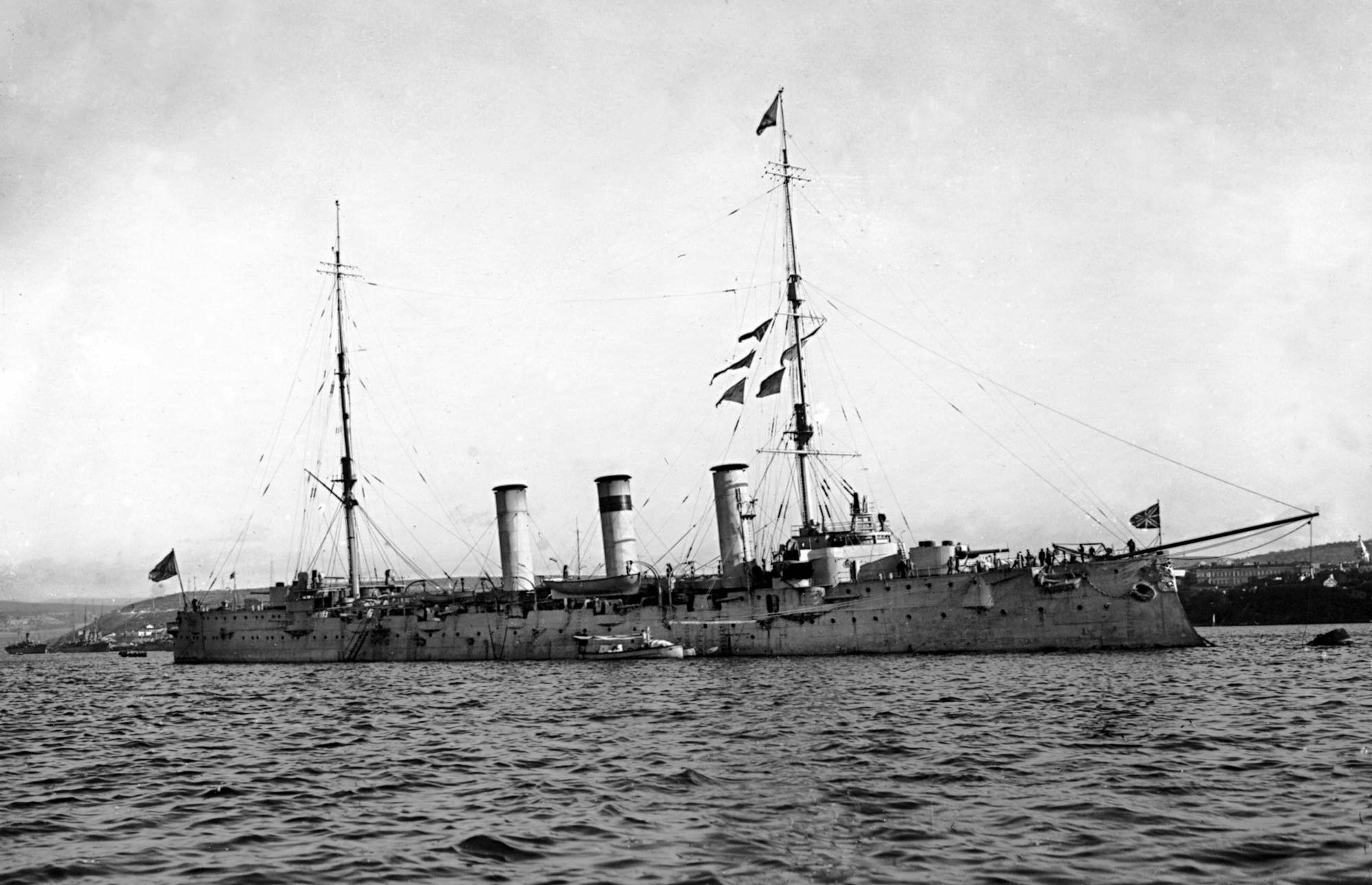
Pamiat' Merkuria in 1914

On 18 November 1914 Pamiat' Merkuria was escorting five pre-dreadnought battleships of the Black Sea Fleet off Cape Sarych when they encountered the German battlecruiser SMS Goeben and the light cruiser SMS Breslau. The Germans sheered off after an early hit on one of Goeben's 15 cm (5.9 in) casemates that started an ammunition fire.

In January 1915 Pamiat' Merkuria and her sister Kagul twice encountered Breslau and the Ottoman protected cruiser Hamidiye, also spelled Hamidieh, but the Ottoman ships escaped both times without either side inflicting any damage.

On 10 May 1915 the Black Sea Fleet bombarded the Ottoman forts defending the Bosporus. Two cruisers, Pamiat' Merkuria and her sister Kagul were posted further out as pickets. Pamiat' Merkuria was spotted by Goeben, which was returning from a patrol off Eregli, 115 miles (185 km) east of the Bosporus. Goeben immediately set off in pursuit while Pamiat' Merkuria headed at full speed for the main body, dodging shells from the German battlecruiser. The Russian pre-dreadnoughts quickly hit Goeben three times, and the battlecruiser broke off the engagement using her superior speed. Pamiat' Merkuria was not damaged during the battle.

Her 6-inch guns were exchanged for sixteen 130 mm (5.1 in)/55 guns during her refit from December 1916 to April 1917. She was dispatched to Constanta on 1 November 1916 to destroy the oil depot abandoned by the Romanians before it was captured by the Germans. A false submarine alarm caused her to abandon the bombardment before she inflicted any damage. But on 4 November Pamiat' Merkuria returned and fired 231 shells, destroying 15 of the 37 oil tanks.

The crew of Pamiat' Merkuria pledged its allegiance to the Ukrainian People's Republic on 12 November 1917 soon after the October Revolution. The occupation of the Ukrainian People's Republic by the Red Army early in 1918 led it to lay up on 28 March 1918 with her guns stripped by Bolsheviks to equip armoured trains. She was captured by the Germans on 1 May 1918 after being left behind in Sevastopol due to its uselessness and used as a barracks ship. She was renamed to Hetman Ivan Mazepa on 17 September 1918 and formally handed over to the Ukrainian State's Navy.

=== Interwar ===
Upon the end of World War I and withdrawal of the Armed Forces of Central powers, she fell into the hands of the Whites under the support of the Triple Entente in November 1918. The British wrecked her engines in April 1919 when the Whites temporarily lost control of Sevastopol, in order to stop the cruiser from being of any use to the advancing Soviets. She was further damaged by the explosion of a mine when the Whites abandoned the Crimea in 1920. Once she fell into Soviet hands she spent several years under repair, which required parts and material from her sisters that were even more damaged. She was given the proper revolutionary name of Komintern, after the Communist International on 31 December 1922 and was recommissioned in June 1923.

She was refitted in 1930 as a training cruiser and lost four boilers which were converted to classrooms. Six of her waist guns were replaced by four obsolete 75 mm/50 guns. Her submerged broadside torpedo tubes were also removed during this refit. She collided with Krasny Kavkaz in 1932 and seriously damaged the forecastle of the latter ship. Sources are unclear when she was rearmed, but it probably wasn't until the late 1930s, probably when her forward smokestack was also removed. She landed all of her 75 mm/50 guns in exchange for a modern suite of anti-aircraft guns: three single 76.2 mm (3 in) 34-K, three single 45 mm (1.8 in) 21-K, two single 25 mm (0.98 in) and five 12.7 mm (0.50 in) machine guns. In 1941 she was modified as a minelayer and could carry 195 mines, but her speed had been reduced to 12 knots.

=== World War II ===
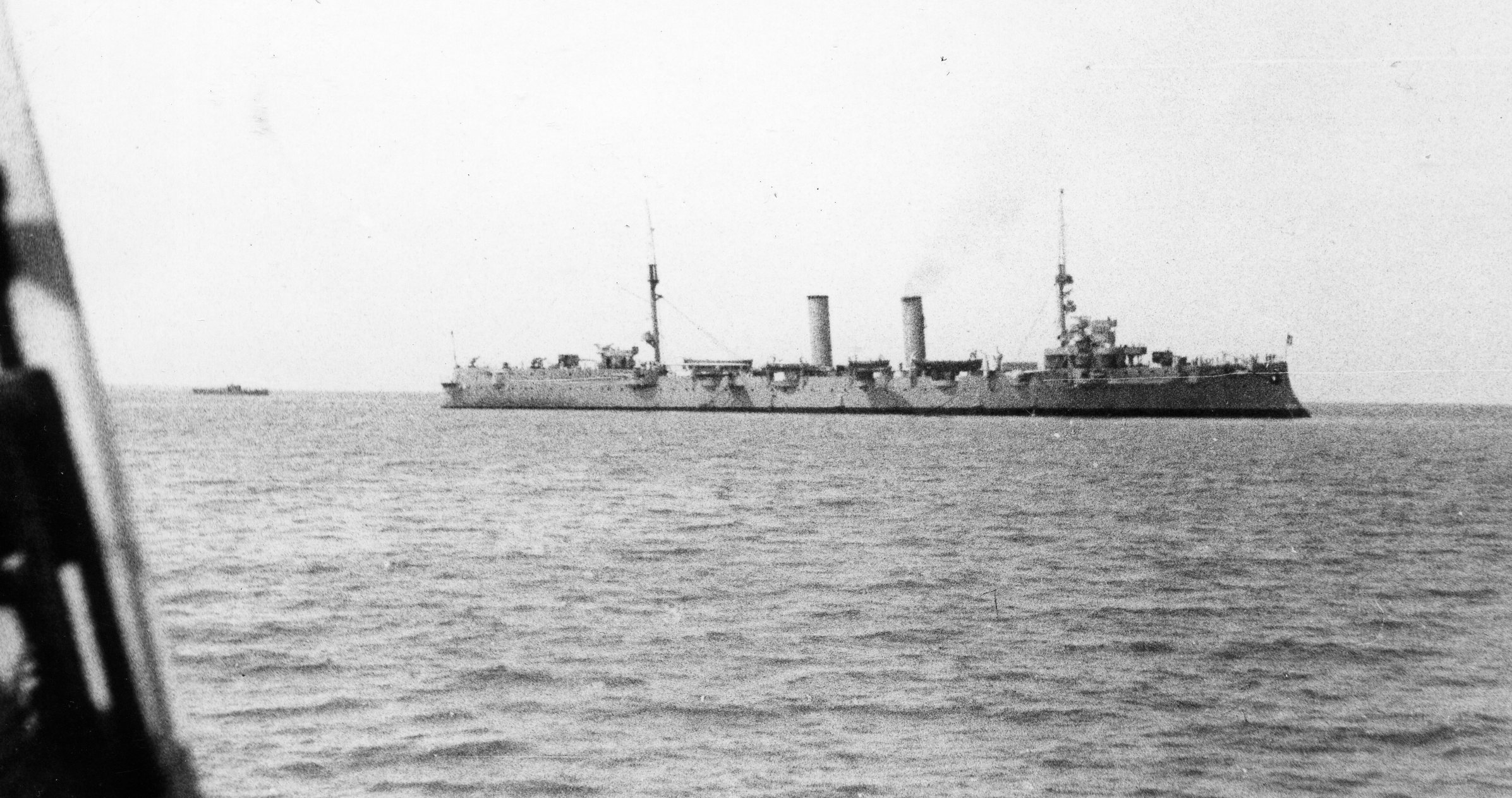
Komintern, 20 June 1941

Komintern, in company with the cruisers Krasny Kavkaz, Chervona Ukraina and a number of destroyers, laid down a defensive mine barrage protecting the Black Sea Fleet base at Sevastopol on 22 June. Komintern, along with the destroyers Nezamozhinsk and Shaumyan, was assigned to cooperate with the Separate Coastal Army on 8 August 1941 and spent much of the next month bombarding Romanian positions and coast defenses. During the siege of Odessa she escorted a number of convoys to and from the besieged city. During the Crimean Campaign Komintern delivered supplies to the 44th Army at Feodosiya on 1 January 1942 and ferried troops and supplies to Sevastopol for the next several months.

She was badly damaged by a German air attack on 11 March, but was able to continue under her own power. She was damaged again in Novorossiysk by I. Gruppe, Kampfgeschwader 76 on 2 July 1942 and moved to Poti shortly afterwards. She was so severely damaged again, or sunk, by another German air attack on 16 July 1942 at Poti that she was deemed non-repairable. She was disarmed in August—September 1942, her guns forming coast defense batteries at Tuapse, and hulked. If she was sunk, she was refloated at some point and on 10 October she was towed to the mouth of the Khobi river, just north of Poti, and sunk as a breakwater.
