= Russian cruiser Ochakov (1902) =

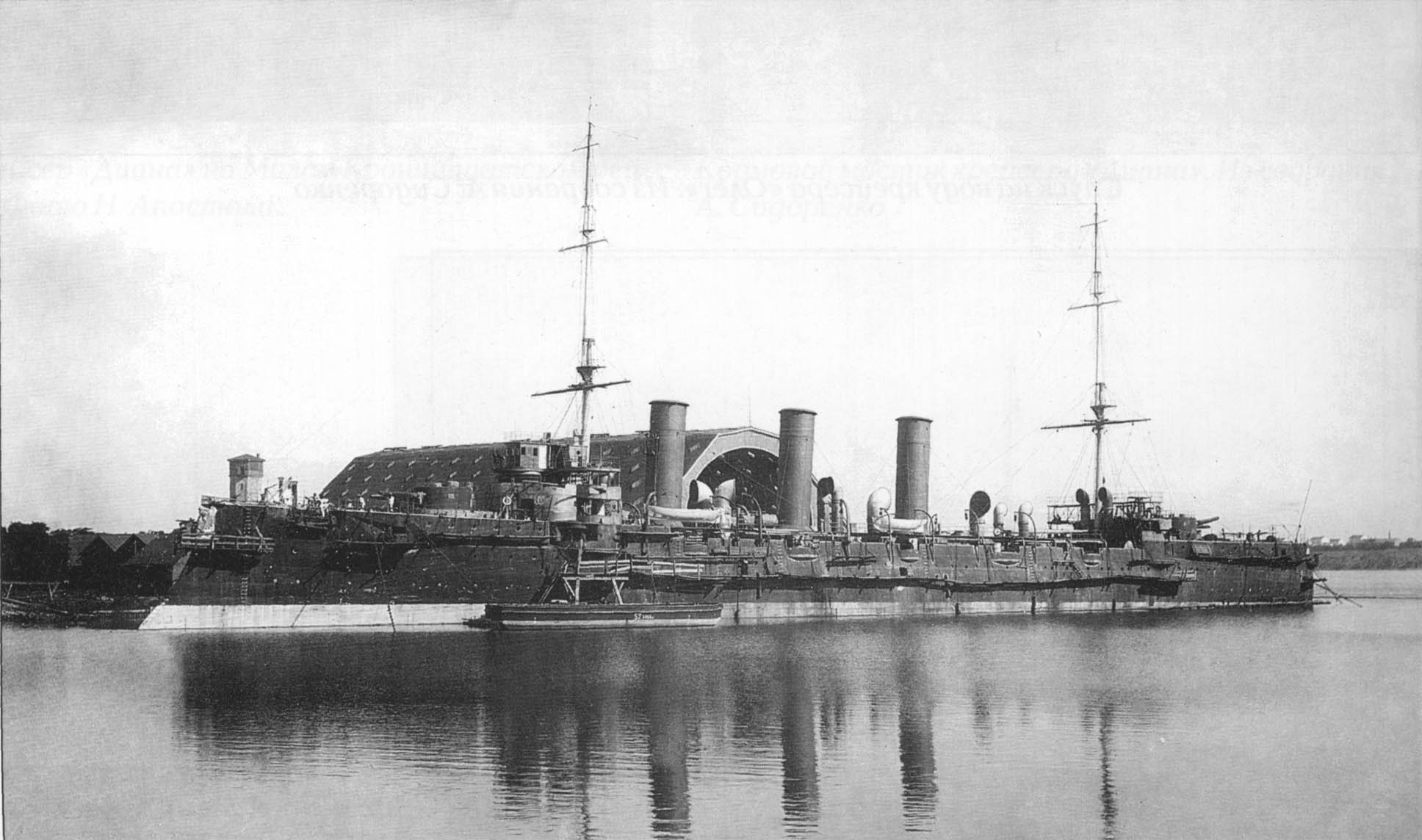
Ochakov under final construction, 1902

Ochakov (Russian: Бронепалубный крейсер Очаков) was a Bogatyr-class protected cruiser of the Imperial Black Sea Fleet of the Imperial Russian Navy best known for its 1905 uprising under captain Pyotr Schmidt during the Russian Revolution of 1905. Launched in 1902, it was renamed to Kagul in 1907 and to General Kornilov in 1919.
