= BAP Almirante Guise (1933) =

Izyaslav-class destroyer

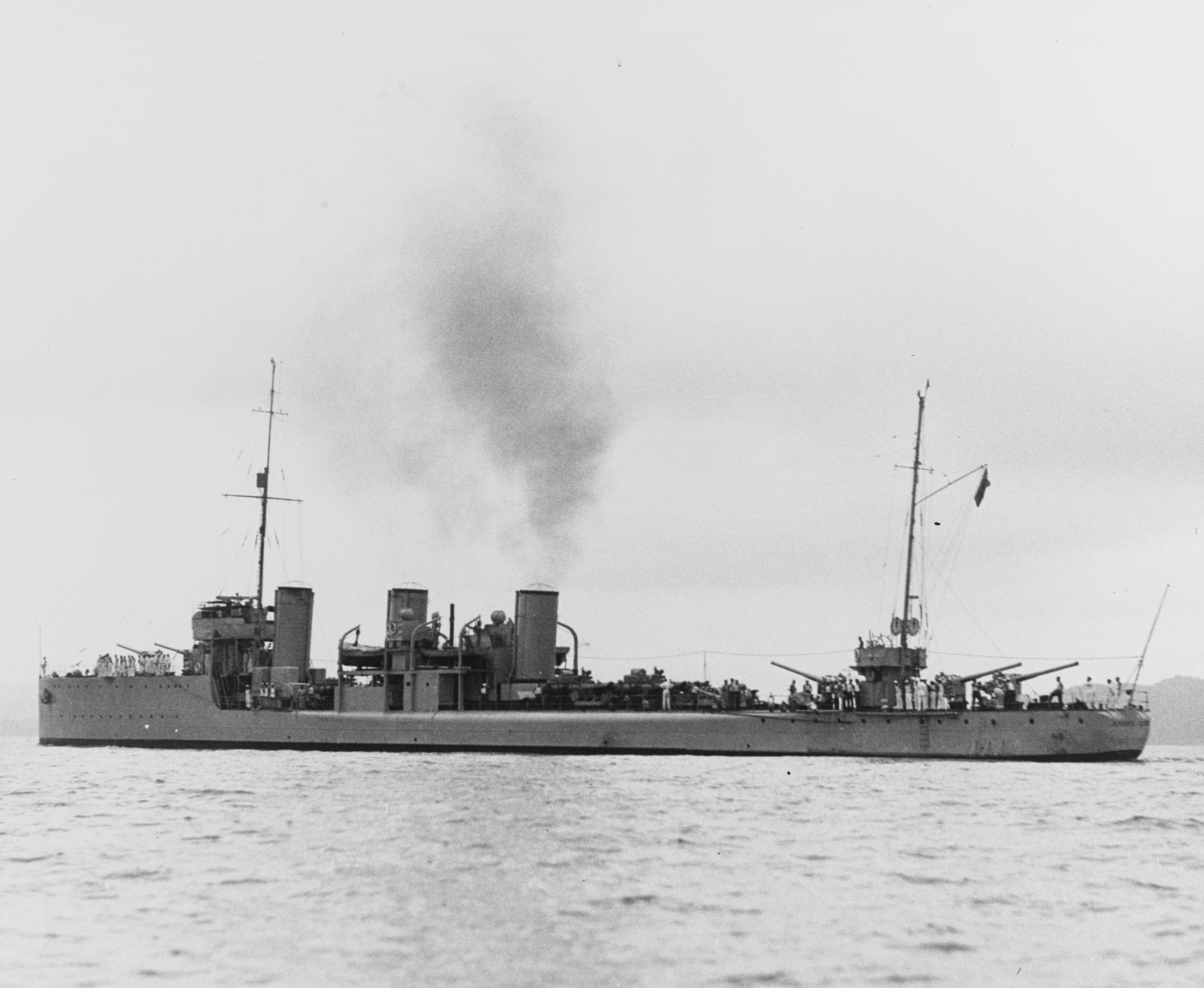
- BAP Almirante Guise in 1934

History

Russian Empire → Russian Republic
- Name: Avtroil
- Builder: Bekker Shipbuilding Yard, Reval
- Laid down: 9 November [O.S. 27 October] 1913
- Launched: January 13, 1915 [O.S. December 31, 1914]
- Commissioned: 12 August [O.S. 30 July] 1917
- Decommissioned: 11 February [O.S. 29 January] 1918
- Fate: Joined the Red Fleet

Soviet Russia
- Name: Avtroil
- Commissioned: 11 February [O.S. 29 January] 1918
- Captured: December 26, 1918, by the Royal Navy
- Fate: Transferred to the Estonian Navy, January 2, 1919

Estonia
- Name: Lennuk
- Acquired: January 2, 1919, from Britain
- Decommissioned: July 30, 1933
- Fate: Sold to the Peruvian government

Peru
- Name: Almirante Guise
- Commissioned: August 24, 1933
- Decommissioned: November 1947
- Fate: Scrapped in 1954

General characteristics (as built)
- Class & type: Izyaslav-class destroyer
- Displacement: normal: 1,390 t (1,370 long tons; 1,530 short tons)
- Length: 107 m (351 ft 1 in)
- Beam: 9.5 m (31 ft 2 in)
- Draught: 4.1 m (13 ft 5 in)
- Installed power: 32,700 metric horsepower (32,300 shp; 24,100 kW)
- Propulsion: 2 steam turbines; 5 Normand boilers; 2 shafts
- Speed: 31 knots (57 km/h; 36 mph)
- Range: 1,880 nmi (3,480 km; 2,160 mi) at 21 knots (39 km/h; 24 mph) (estimated)
- Complement: 150
- Armament: 5 × single 102 mm (4 in) guns; 1 × 76 mm (3 in) Lender AA gun (1 × 2.5 in (63.5 mm) AA gun until August 1917); 3 × triple 450 mm (18 in) torpedo tubes; 80 mines

BAP Almirante Guise was a destroyer that served in the Russian, Estonian, and Peruvian Navies from 1917 to 1947. She was a rebuilt type of the Izyaslav class. Originally named Avtroil (Russian: Автроил) while in Russian service, in 1918 she was captured by Royal Navy and handed over to Estonia where she was renamed Lennuk. The ship participated in the Estonian War of Independence, and served with the Estonian Navy until 1933, when she was sold to Peru where she was renamed Almirante Guise.

== Design and description ==
The Izyaslav-class ships were designed to serve as flotilla leaders for the Novik-type destroyers. The ships normally displaced 1,390 tonnes (1,370 long tons; 1,530 short tons) and 1,570–1,590 tonnes (1,550–1,560 long tons; 1,730–1,750 short tons) at full load. They measured 107 meters (351 ft 1 in) long overall with a beam of 9.5 meters (31 ft 2 in), and a draft of 4.1 meters (13 ft 5 in). The Izyslavs were propelled by two steam turbines, each driving one propeller using steam from five Normand-Vulcan boilers. The turbines were designed to produce a total of 32,700 metric horsepower (32,300 shp) for an intended maximum speed of 35 knots (65 km/h; 40 mph). During the ships' sea trials, they only reached 31.7–31.8 knots (58.7–58.9 km/h; 36.5–36.6 mph) despite outputs of 34,975–35,700 metric horsepower (34,497–35,212 shp). The ships carried enough fuel oil to give them an estimated range of 1,880 nautical miles (3,480 km; 2,160 mi) at 21 knots (39 km/h; 24 mph). Their crew numbered 150.

The Izyaslav-class ships were originally intended to have an armament of two single 102 mm (4 in) Pattern 1911 Obukhov guns, one each at the bow and stern, and a dozen 450 mm (18 in) torpedo tubes in six double mounts. The Naval General Staff changed this to four triple mounts once they became available and then decided to remove a torpedo mount in exchange for another four-inch gun at the stern on 20 August 1915 while the ships were still under construction. Another gun was ordered to be added on the forecastle on 25 May 1916. Izyaslav was completed with this gun armament, but her sister ships had another gun added on the stern in April 1917. All of these guns were on the centerline and interfered with each other's movements. Anti-aircraft defense was provided by a 2.5-inch (63.5 mm) Pattern 1916 anti-aircraft (AA) gun, which was replaced by a 76 mm (3 in) Lender AA gun in August 1917, both in single mounts amidships. The Izyaslavs were completed with one triple torpedo mount between the forward funnels and two mounts aft of the rear funnel. They could carry 80 M1912 naval mines. They were also fitted with a Barr and Stroud rangefinder and two 60-centimeter (24 in) searchlights.

== Service history ==
Following the collapse of the Russian Empire and the intervention into the Russian Civil War by the Allies, Avtroil and Spartak, then under Bolshevik control, were captured by British cruisers and destroyers in the Baltic in December 1918. The ships were transferred to Estonia, from which they were purchased by the Peruvian Navy in 1933. Lennuk (ex-Avtroil) was renamed Almirante Guise and served with the Peruvian Navy until she was scrapped in 1954.
