= Izyaslav-class destroyer =

20th century Baltic Fleet warship class

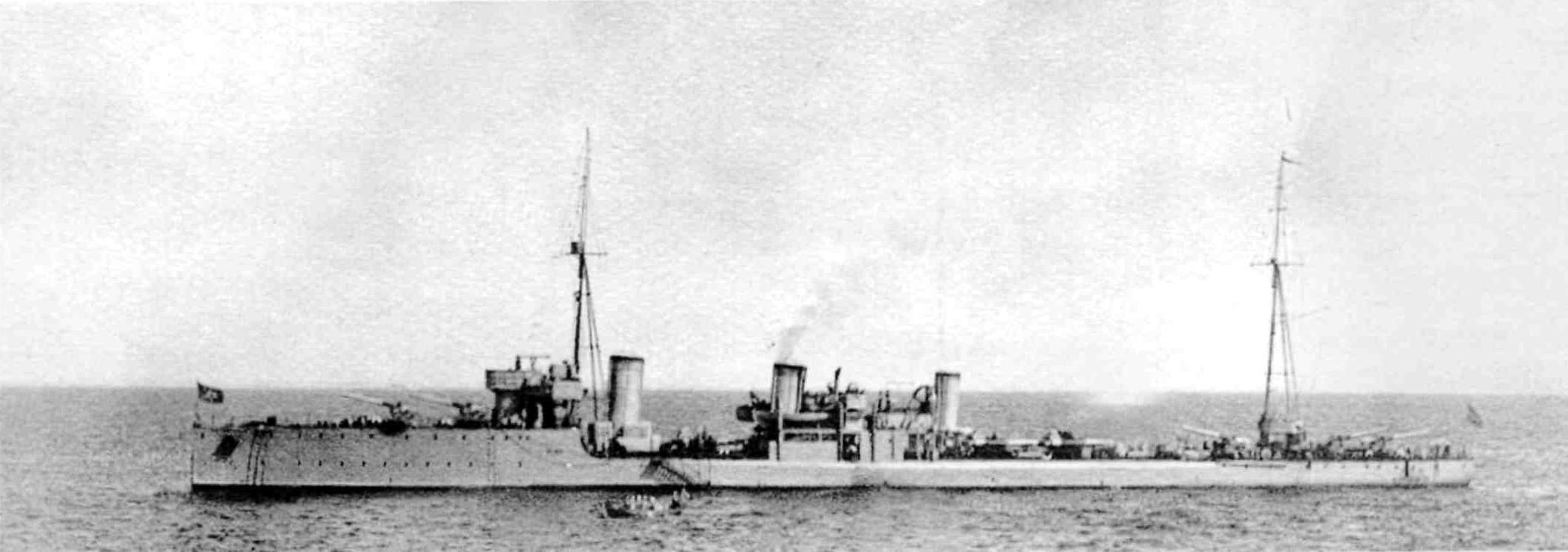
- Karl Marx, the former Izyaslav

Class overview
- Name: Izyaslav class
- Builders: Bocker and Lange, Reval, Estonia
- Operators: Imperial Russian Navy; Soviet Navy; Estonian Navy; Peruvian Navy
- Preceded by: Orfey class
- In commission: 1916–1954
- Planned: 5
- Completed: 3
- Canceled: 2
- Lost: 2
- Scrapped: 1

General characteristics (as built)
- Type: Destroyer
- Displacement: 1,390 long tons (1,410 t)
- Length: 107 m (351 ft 1 in)
- Beam: 9.5 m (31 ft 2 in)
- Draught: 4.1 m (13 ft 5 in)
- Installed power: 5 Normand boilers; 32,700 shp (24,400 kW)
- Propulsion: 2 shafts; 2 steam turbines
- Speed: 31 knots (57 km/h; 36 mph)
- Range: 1,880 nmi (3,480 km; 2,160 mi) at 21 knots (39 km/h; 24 mph) (estimated)
- Complement: 150
- Armament: 4–5 × single 4 in (102 mm) guns; 3 × triple 17.7 in (450 mm) torpedo tubes; 1 × 2.5 in (64 mm) AA gun; 1 × 3 in (76 mm) Lender AA gun; 80 mines

The Izyaslav class (Russian: Изяслав) were a class of destroyer flotilla leaders built for the Baltic Fleet of the Imperial Russian Navy during World War I.

== Design and description ==
The Izyaslav-class ships were designed to serve as flotilla leaders for the Novik-type destroyers. The ships normally displaced 1,390 long tons (1,410 t) and 1,570–1,590 long tons (1,600–1,620 t) at full load. They measured 107 meters (351 ft 1 in) long overall with a beam of 9.5 meters (31 ft 2 in), and a draft of 4.1 meters (13 ft 5 in). The Izyslavs were propelled by two Brown-Boveri-Parsons steam turbines, each driving one propeller using steam from five Normand-Vulcan boilers. The turbines were designed to produce a total of 32,700 shaft horsepower (24,400 kW) for an intended maximum speed of 35 knots (65 km/h; 40 mph). During the ships' sea trials, they only reached 31.7–31.8 knots (58.7–58.9 km/h; 36.5–36.6 mph) despite outputs of 34,975–35,700 shp (26,081–26,621 kW). The ships carried enough fuel oil to give them an estimated range of 1,880 nautical miles (3,480 km; 2,160 mi) at 21 knots (39 km/h; 24 mph). Their crew numbered 150.

The Izyaslav-class ships were originally intended to have an armament of two 60-caliber 102 mm (4 in) Pattern 1911 Obukhov guns, one each at the bow and stern, and a dozen 450-millimeter (17.7 in) torpedo tubes in six double mounts. The Naval General Staff changed this to four triple mounts once they became available in 1914 and then decided to remove a torpedo mount in exchange for another four-inch gun at the stern on 20 August 1915 while the ships were still under construction. Another gun was ordered to be added on the forecastle on 25 May 1916. Izyaslav was complete with this gun armament, but her sister ships had another gun added on the stern in April 1917. All of these guns were on the centerline and interfered with each other's movements. Anti-aircraft defense was provided by a 63-millimeter (2.5 in) Pattern 1916 anti-aircraft (AA) gun and a 76-millimeter (3 in) Lender AA gun, both in single mounts amidships. The Izyaslavs were completed with one triple torpedo mount between the forward funnels and two mounts aft of the rear funnel. They could carry 80 M1912 naval mines. They were also fitted with a Barr and Stroud rangefinder and two 60-centimeter (24 in) searchlights.

== Ships ==
These ships were built by Bocker and Lange in Reval, Estonia. The ships were delayed due to ordering machinery from Switzerland which was embargoed on the outbreak of World War I. New machinery was ordered from Britain.

Construction data
Ship (original name in Russian service)	Name(s) in Soviet or foreign services (ships were renamed)	Laid down	Launched	Completed	Fate
Avtroil	Estonian Lennuk; Peruvian Almirante Guise	9 November 1913	13 January 1915	12 August 1917	Captured by the British in 1918, given to the Estonian Navy and sold by the Estonians to Peru in 1933, scrapped, 1954
Izyaslav	Karl Marx	27 October 1913	9 November 1914	16 June 1917	Sunk, 8 August 1941
Prymyslav	Kalinin	27 October 1913	27 June 1915	20 July 1927	Sunk, 28 August 1941
Bryachislav	NA		1 October 1915	NA	Evacuated to Petrograd, but scrapped incomplete, 1923
Fedor Stratilat	NA		1915	NA	Evacuated to Petrograd, but scrapped incomplete, 1923

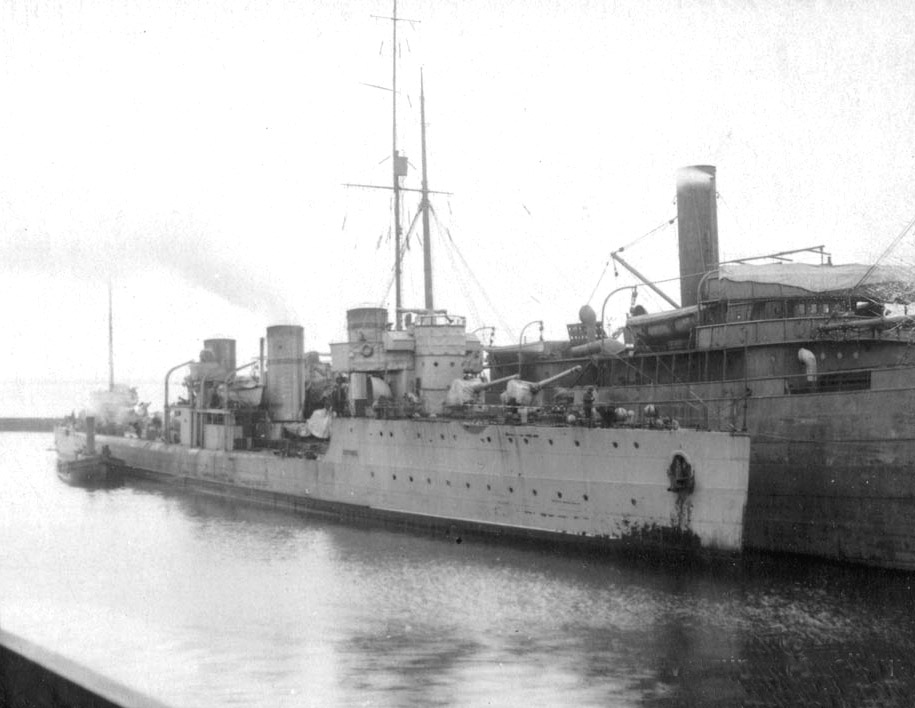
Avtroil, c. 1913–1919

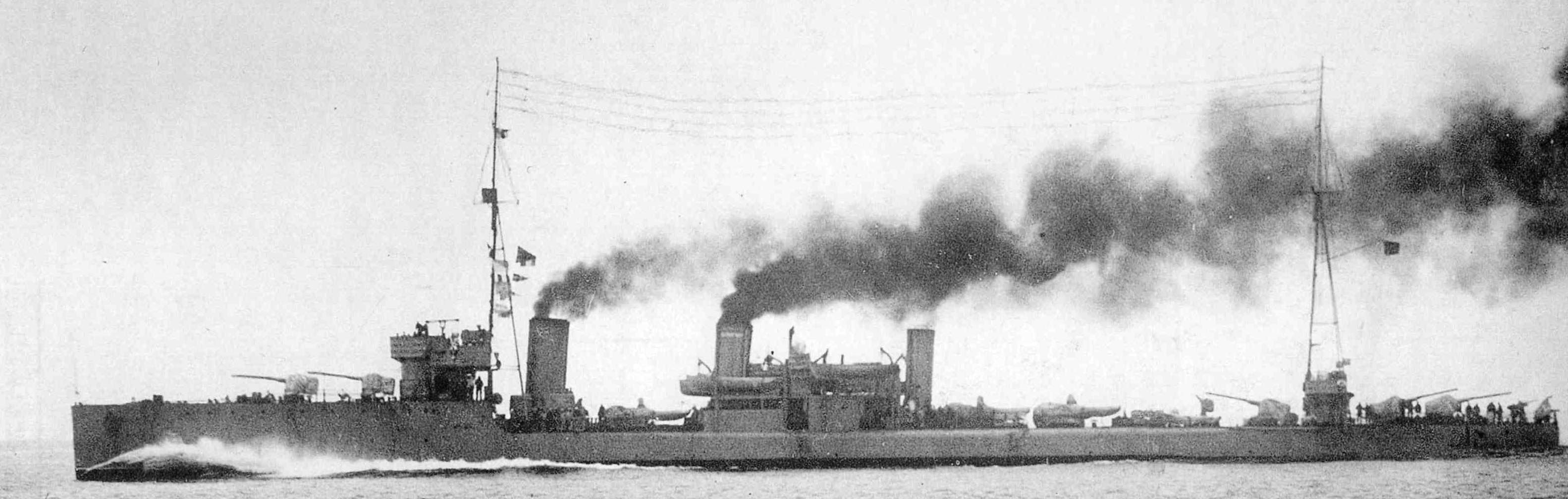
Kalinin c. 1925-1941

== Bibliography ==
Media related to Izyaslav class destroyer at Wikimedia Commons

- Apalkov, Yu. V. (1996). Боевые корабли русского флота: 8.1914-10.1917г [Combat Ships of the Russian Fleet: 8.1914-10.1917] (in Russian). Saint Petersburg, Russia: ИНТЕК. ISBN 5-7559-0018-3.
- Breyer, Siegfried (1992). Soviet Warship Development: Volume 1: 1917–1937. London: Conway Maritime Press. ISBN 0-85177-604-3.
- Budzbon, Przemysław (2026). "The High-Speed Destroyers of the Novik Type: Part I". In Jordan, John (ed.). Warship 2026. Osprey Publishing. pp. 8–29. ISBN 978-1-4728-7259-3.
- Budzbon, Przemysław (1985). "Russia". In Gray, Randal (ed.). Conway's All the World's Fighting Ships 1906–1921. Annapolis, Maryland: Naval Institute Press. pp. 291–325. ISBN 0-85177-245-5.
- Budzbon, Przemysław; Radziemski, Jan & Twardowski, Marek (2022). Warships of the Soviet Fleets 1939–1945. Vol. I: Major Combatants. Annapolis, Maryland: Naval Institute Press. ISBN 978-1-68247-877-6.
- Campbell, John (1985). Naval Weapons of World War II. Annapolis, Maryland: Naval Institute Press. ISBN 0-87021-459-4.
- Friedman, Norman (2011). Naval Weapons of World War One: Guns, Torpedoes, Mines and ASW Weapons of All Nations; An Illustrated Directory. Barnsley, UK: Seaforth Publishing. ISBN 978-1-84832-100-7.
- Hill, Alexander (2018). Soviet Destroyers of World War II. New Vanguard. Vol. 256. Oxford, UK: Osprey Publishing. ISBN 978-1-4728-2256-7.
- Rohwer, Jürgen (2005). Chronology of the War at Sea 1939–1945: The Naval History of World War Two (Third Revised ed.). Annapolis, Maryland: Naval Institute Press. ISBN 1-59114-119-2.
- Verstyuk, Anatoly & Gordeyev, Stanislav (2006). Корабли Минных дивизий. От "Новика" до "Гогланда" [Torpedo Division Ships: From Novik to Gogland] (in Russian). Moscow: Voennaya Kniga. ISBN 5-902863-10-4.
- Watts, Anthony J. (1990). The Imperial Russian Navy. London: Arms and Armour. ISBN 0-85368-912-1.
- Whitley, M. J. (1988). Destroyers of World War 2. Annapolis, Maryland: Naval Institute Press. ISBN 0-87021-326-1.
- Zubkov, Dmitry (2025). Soviet and Russians Destroyer Exports. Vol. 1: Imperial Russian-Built Destroyers in Service with Foreign Navies, 1904–1954. Helion. ISBN 978-1-804515-58-7.
