= Estonian destroyer Wambola =

Destroyer of the Estonian Navy during the interwar period

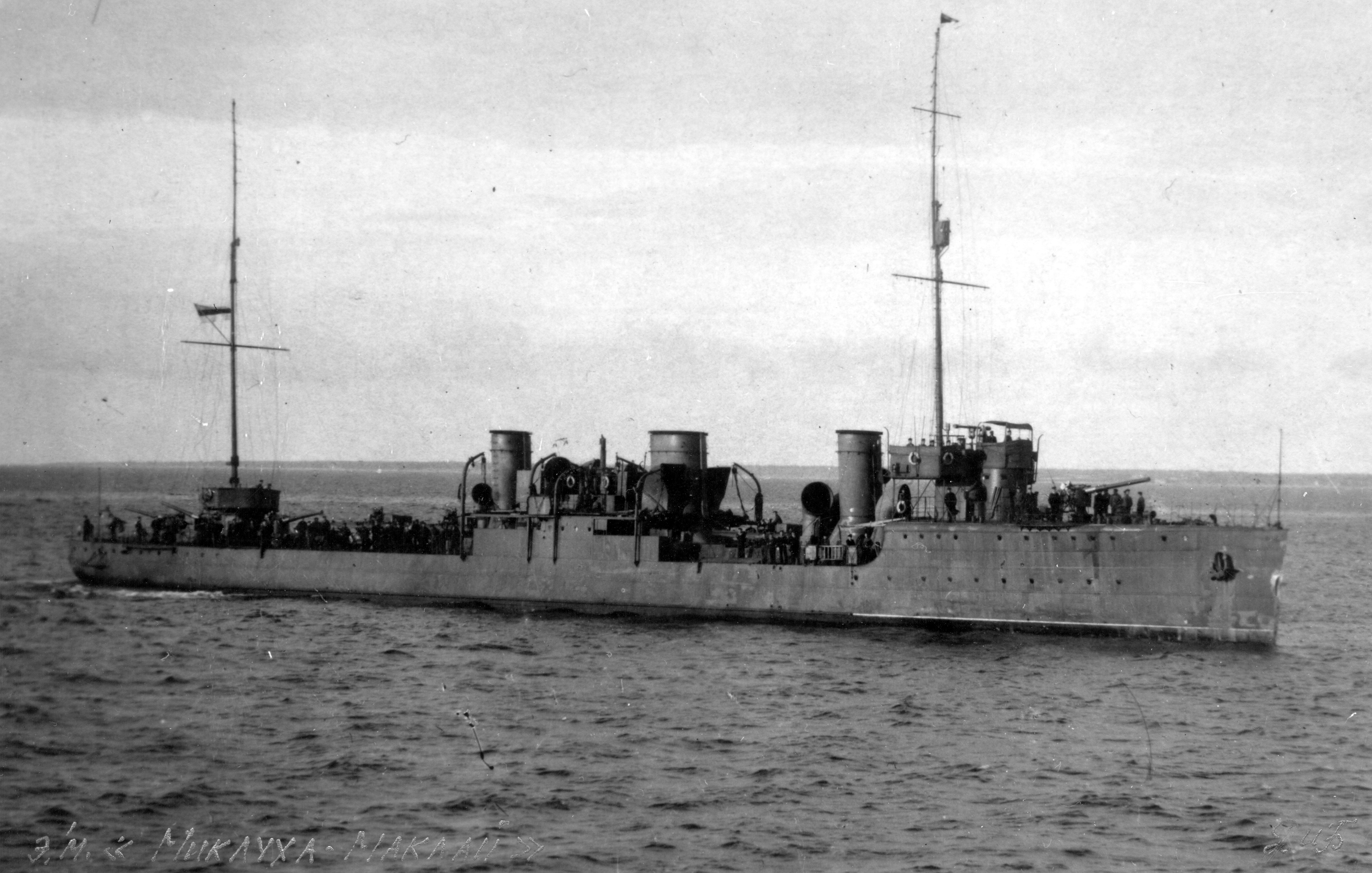
- Appearance of the ship under the Estonian naval ensign, which was used in 1918–1926

History

Russian Empire → Russian Republic
- Name: Kapitan I ranga Miklouho-Maclay (Russian: Капитан 1-го ранга Миклухо-Маклай)
- Builder: Putilov works, Petrograd
- Laid down: November 5 [O.S. October 23] 1914
- Launched: August 27 [O.S. August 14] 1915
- Commissioned: December 25 [O.S. December 12] 1917 (nominally)
- Decommissioned: February 11 [O.S. January 29] 1918
- Fate: Joined the Red Fleet

Soviet Russia
- Name: Kapitan I ranga Miklouho-Maclay (until December 18, 1918); Spartak (Russian: Спартак)
- Commissioned: February 11 [O.S. January 29] 1918
- Captured: December 26, 1918, by the Royal Navy
- Fate: Transferred to the Estonian Navy, January 2, 1919

Estonia
- Name: Wambola
- Acquired: January 2, 1919, from Britain
- Decommissioned: July 30, 1933
- Fate: Sold to the Peruvian government

Peru
- Name: Almirante Villar
- Commissioned: August 24, 1933
- Decommissioned: September 15, 1954
- Fate: Scrapped

General characteristics
- Class & type: Leytenant Ilin-class destroyer
- Displacement: normal: 1,260 t (1,240 long tons; 1,390 short tons); full: 1,538 or 1,620 t (1,514 or 1,594 long tons; 1,695 or 1,786 short tons)
- Length: 98.06 m (321 ft 9 in)
- Draft: 2.8–3.7 m (9 ft 2 in – 12 ft 2 in)
- Propulsion: 2 Curtis AEG two-shaft steam turbines with 31,500 metric horsepower (31,100 shp); 4 Normand-Vulcan type oil boilers; 2 shafts
- Speed: 30 kn (35 mph; 56 km/h)
- Range: 1,720 nmi (3,190 km; 1,980 mi)
- Complement: 171 people (Imperial Russian Navy); 142 people (Estonian Navy)
- Armament: 4 × 102 mm (4 in) naval guns; 1 × 76 mm (3 in) anti-aircraft gun; naval mines

Wambola was a destroyer of the Estonian Navy during the interwar period, originally a Russian Leytenant Ilin-class ship. Previously, it was known as the Russian Kapitan I ranga Miklouho-Maclay during World War I, later the Soviet Spartak, and subsequently the Peruvian Almirante Villar.

The construction of the vessel began in 1914 for the Imperial Russian Navy, launched in 1915, and entered service in 1917 under the name Kapitan I ranga Miklouho-Maclay (Russian: Капитан 1-го ранга Миклухо-Маклай, lit. 'Captain 1st Rank Miklouho-Maclay'). It avoided capture by the Germans by fleeing Helsingfors during the Ice March. The ship was taken over by the Red Fleet and renamed Spartak (Russian: Спартак, lit. 'Spartacus'). During the conflict against Estonia, it participated in landing and mining operations. In December 1918, it was captured by the Royal Navy and handed over to the Estonians. In the Estonian Navy, it was named Wambola. During the Estonian War of Independence, it took part in operations against the Bolsheviks in the waters of the Gulf of Finland and in operations against the Baltische Landeswehr in Riga. After the war, it made occasional diplomatic visits. In 1933, due to high maintenance costs, it was sold to Peru. In the Peruvian Navy, it was named Almirante Villar, 'Admiral Villar'. It did not manage to participate in the Colombia–Peru War but took part in battles against Ecuador in 1941. During World War II, it served in patrol duties and was decommissioned in 1954.

== Background and construction ==
The Russian Empire suffered significantly from its conflict with Japan, both in terms of prestige and naval power. To recover from these losses and modernize the navy, efforts were made to expand its potential. This was ultimately decided by the Shipbuilding Intensification Program, adopted by a decisive majority in the State Duma on 19 June 1912. The plan, approved by Nicholas II on August 9, (Note: Kosiarz (1979, p. 24) provides the date of July 19, 1912.) included the construction of 12 cruisers (including 4 battlecruisers), 12 submarines, and 36 destroyers.

Preliminary requirements for the destroyers were defined in 1907. Vessels with a displacement of up to 1,000 tons were to be powered by steam turbines, providing a speed of 35 knots. There was a strong emphasis on seaworthiness and armament, which was to include a pair of twin torpedo tubes and two 120 mm L/45 guns.

All destroyers resulting from the program are collectively referred to as the Novik class, named after the prototype ship. However, in reality, they belonged to six different types. The technical specifications for the destroyers, approved on 6 October 1911 and sent to the shipyards, called for significantly stronger torpedo armament – six twin launchers. On 13 June 1912, the Main Directorate of Shipbuilding selected a design submitted by the Putilov works, which was instructed to make minor corrections. The updated design was approved by the Ministry of the Navy on August 16, after which orders were placed with several Russian shipyards.

Among the ordered destroyers, eight were to be built by the Putilov works. The relevant contract was signed on 11 January 1913. Among the destroyers, later referred to as the Leytenant Ilin class, was to be a vessel named Kapitan II ranga Kingsbergen (Russian: Капитан 2-го ранга Кингсберген, lit. 'Captain 2nd Rank Kingsbergen'). Since the Putilov works could not fulfill the entire order, the Putilov works was established in 1912, where construction of two destroyers began on 1 July 1913.

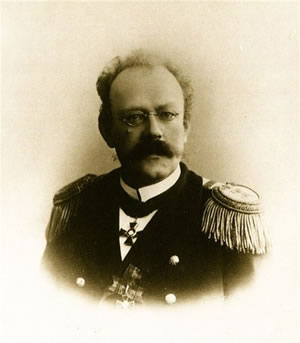
Admiral Ushakov's Commander Vladimir Nikolaevich Miklukha

Due to the looming threat of war, the planned Kapitan II ranga Kingsbergen was renamed on 22 June 1914, (Note: According to Ehlers (2012, p. 49), the renaming would not take place until 27 June 1915.) as the previous name was considered unpatriotic, sounding German. The ship was named Kapitan I ranga Miklouho-Maclay in memory of Captain 1st Rank Vladimir Miklukha (a.k.a. Vladimir Miklouho-Maclay by analogy with his older brother), who fell in the Battle of Tsushima.

The keel was laid on 5 November 1914 at the Putilov works, after the launching of Kapitan Izylmetyev.

Most of the ship's components – hull, boilers, steam turbines, and torpedo launchers – were manufactured by the Putilov works, which collaborated on this task with Blohm+Voss. These contacts were severed due to the outbreak of World War I, and similar situations occurred with other foreign suppliers from Central Powers and neutral countries. Consequently, Russian companies were burdened with additional orders, which they were not always able to fulfill. For Miklouho-Maclay, construction delays were caused by a shortage of drive shafts, which the Obukhov Works failed to produce on time. In May 1915, top-down measures were taken to help supply the shipyards with materials.

Kapitan I ranga Miklouho-Maclay was launched on 27 August 1915. Further delays in its delivery were caused by broken blades in the ship's right turbine.

== Design description ==
=== Hull ===
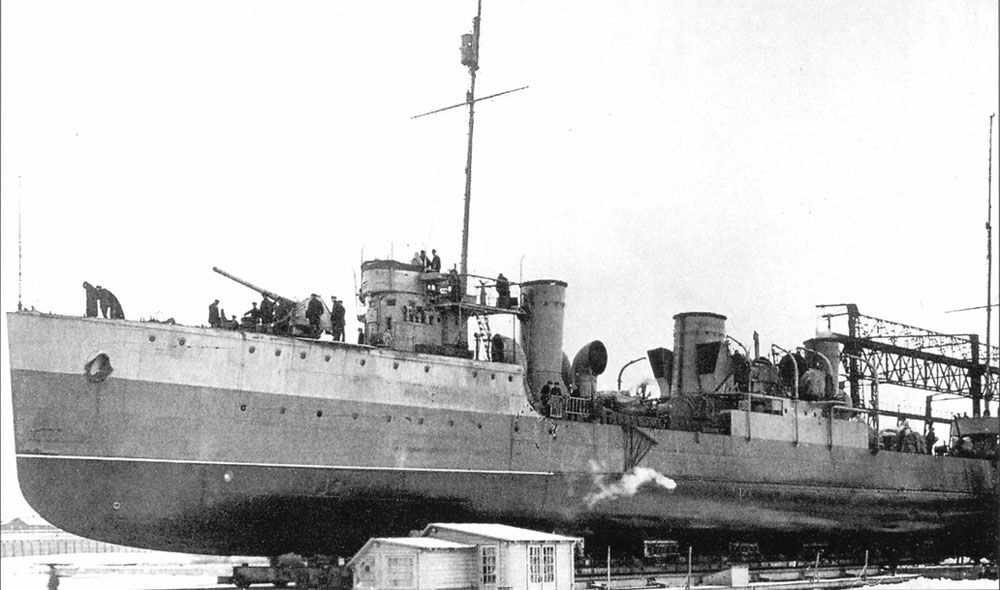
Wambola at the slipway in Tallinn

The full displacement of Kapitan I ranga Miklouho-Maclay was either 1,538 or 1,620 tons, with a design or normal displacement of 1,260 tons. The length overall of the ship was 98.06 m, while the length between perpendiculars was 96.08 m. The maximum beam was 9.33 m. The draft was 2.8 m at the bow and 3.7 m at the stern. At a displacement of 1,260 tons, the draft did not exceed 3 m. The ship was divided into compartments by 12 main watertight bulkheads. Between frames 41 and 139, under the machinery and boiler compartments, there was a double bottom. Side roll stabilizers of the Frahm system were used to counteract rolling. Both Frahm tanks and double-bottom tanks stored fuel reserves.

The deck housed four small auxiliary vessels, including two motorized ones.

The crew of Kapitan I ranga Miklouho-Maclay consisted of 171 sailors and officers.

=== Propulsion ===
The ship was powered by 2 double-shaft Curtis AEG turbines. Each was housed in separate compartments and had a power of 15,000 hp, with the actual achieved power reaching up to 31,500 hp. The destroyer had 4 Normand or Normand-Vulcan oil-fired boilers, each in separate compartments. The working pressure in the boiler was 17 atmospheres, and the heating surface was 1,000 m^{2}. Exhaust gases were expelled through one of three chimneys, with the middle, twice as wide, chimney serving two boilers. The ship had two boiler water tanks, holding 10 and 13 tons each, and one freshwater tank holding 11.8 tons. The turbines drove two screws. Miklouho-Maclay could reach a speed of 30 knots. A fuel reserve of 500 tons allowed for a range of 1,253 nautical miles at a speed of 16 knots or 634 at 24 knots. The rudder blade area was 6.2 m^{2}. Electric power was supplied by 2 turbo generators, each with a capacity of 20 kW, and an emergency petrol generator with a capacity of 10 kW.

=== Armament ===
All Novik-class destroyers were initially to be equipped with 12 torpedo tubes grouped into 4 triple sets. However, due to experiences from mid-1915 – specifically the engagement of Novik with two Kaiserliche Marine destroyers – the number of torpedo tubes was reduced to 9 to enhance the ship's artillery strength. The 450 mm torpedo tube had electric drive, and the ability to fan out the tubes up to 7° allowed for a spread salvo. The torpedoes used were 450 mm Whitehead models, 5,550 mm in length and weighing 810 kg (with 100 kg for the warhead). The piston-powered torpedoes could achieve speeds of 43 knots over a distance of 2 km, 30 knots over 5 km, and 28 knots over 6 km.

The ship's primary artillery consisted of 102 mm 60 caliber Pattern 1911 from the Obukhov Plant. Initially, Miklouho-Maclay was to use two guns, but the number was increased to three based on the experiences of Novik. In spring 1917, another artillery unit was added. The barrel length was 6,284 mm (61.6 calibers), with a rifled section of 5,285 mm. (Note: Campbell (1985, p. 362) provides the length of the rifled section as 57 calibers, which when converted gives 5,791 mm.) Inside, there were 24 screw threads, each 1.016 mm deep. The horizontal falling-block action weighed from 50 to 53 kg. The gun with its carriage weighed 5.7 tons. The barrel itself weighed 2.2 or 2.8 tons. The gun was shielded by a 38 mm thick, 290 kg shield. The barrel could be depressed to 6 degrees and elevated to 15 degrees, but the pedestal mounting allowed angles of -10° to +30° (with a 500 mm high pedestal). The gun could rotate horizontally without limitations. Both horizontal and vertical movements were at a maximum speed of 3 degrees per second.

The gun could fire the following shells:

| Shell type | Weight | Length | Notes |
|---|---|---|---|
| explosive model 1911 | 17.5 kg | 5 calibers | 2.4 kg of explosive material |
| explosive model 1915 (Note: According to Чернышов (2007, p. 55), explosives model 1916.) | 17.5 kg | 5 calibers | 2.1 kg of explosive material |
| shrapnel shell | 17.5 kg | 4.38 calibers | 22-second delay fuze |
| incendiary | 17.6 kg | 4 calibers | |
| diving | 15.8 kg | 5.05 calibers | 3.13 kg of explosive material |
| illuminating | 15.08 kg | 4.7 calibers | |
| chemical | ? | ? | filled with asphyxiating gas |

The gun position was operated by a crew of 7. Theoretical rate of fire was 15 rounds per minute, well-trained crews could achieve 12 rounds per minute, and practical rate of fire was 10 rounds per minute. For the 1915 model explosive shell, initial velocity was 823 m/s, and range at 30° elevation was about 16.1 km. For shrapnel and diving shells, these figures were 11 km at 768 m/s and 2.2 km at 208.8 m/s, respectively.

For anti-aircraft defense, the ship was initially equipped with a QF 2-pounder naval gun. However, due to its low effectiveness on other ships, it was replaced in 1917 with a Russian 76 mm air-defense gun M1914/15. Minor structural changes were made, placing the ammunition compartments for this gun in the torpedo magazine. The 1.3-ton, 30.5-caliber long barrel could be elevated to 65 degrees and depressed to -5 degrees. The theoretical rate of fire was 30 rounds per minute, but in practice, from 10 to 12 rounds per minute were achieved. Shells were fired at an initial velocity of 588 m/s, reaching an altitude of up to 6,000 m. The ammunition used was from the 76 mm divisional gun M1902, with each shell weighing 6.45 kg.

The ship's armament was complemented by model 1912 naval mines, each containing 100 kg of TNT. They were suitable for use at depths of up to 130 m. The ship could carry up to 80 mines.

Fire control was supported by two sights produced by the Obukhov Works. These 62 kg devices allowed observation over an 8° field with fivefold optical magnification. The foredeck bridge housed a rangefinder manufactured by Barr and Stroud in the United Kingdom. For nighttime operations, two reflectors with 60 cm diameter mirrors were available.

== Service in Russia ==
=== Commissioning ===
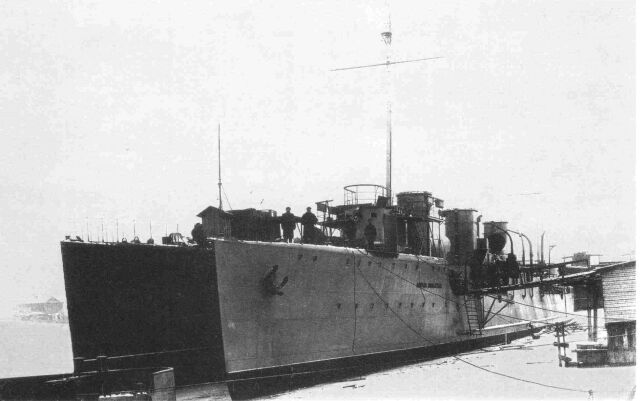
Kapitan I ranga Miklouho-Maclay and Kapitan Izylmetyev

In 1917, trials of the ship began. The shipyard conducted internal tests of the ship's systems and mechanisms between November 9 and November 28. The acceptance committee began examining the ship on December 2 with artillery trials conducted in Kronstadt. The destroyer underwent two four-hour trial runs: on December 4, the ship reached a speed of 23 knots, and on December 12, at full engine power, it reached 28.8 knots. The third trial, scheduled for December 25, was postponed to the next year due to bad weather. As a result, Kapitan I ranga Miklouho-Maclay was conditionally accepted into the Russian Navy.

=== Effects of the October Revolution ===
At the time of the October Revolution, the ship was stationed in Helsingfors. The crew did not oppose the Bolshevik takeover; moreover, along with the crews of other ships in the Torpedo Division, the sailors of Kapitan I ranga Miklouho-Maclay formed a regiment that strengthened the ground forces in the city.

The aftermath of the revolution saw mass desertions of officers from ships taken over by their crews. Efforts were made to rectify the situation on the ship by recruiting and promoting existing petty officers and sailors to officer ranks. However, these ranks also dwindled – according to a report from 29 April 1918, the ship's complement was down to 5 officers and 65 sailors. The reduction in crew numbers was due to the formation of units from sailors, who were considered the most politically conscious, to fight against the counter-revolution. Recruiting workers evacuated from Reval and Helsingfors did little to help. All this resulted in the ship being poorly prepared for combat.

=== Treaty of Brest-Litovsk ===
The Treaty of Brest-Litovsk, signed on 3 March 1918, ended the war between Russia and the Central Powers. One of the conditions was the withdrawal of Russian naval forces from ports in Finland and Estonia. Ice covering the Gulf of Finland hindered this withdrawal, but the approaching German-Finnish forces prompted an accelerated redeployment. Kapitan I ranga Miklouho-Maclay did not have enough fuel to reach Petrograd and had to refuel from stores on Opasnoj Island. With the depot staff already evacuated or dispersed, the ship's crew had to manage on their own. A group led by Boatswain Kudzielko was sent to the island, where they managed to activate the pumps and refuel their own ship and the destroyer Iziaslav. The refueled unit joined the fourth group (9 destroyers, 3 transports, and 4 tugboats), which departed for Kronstadt on April 10 at 3:00 PM. Due to the ice covering the sea (between 70 and 80 cm) and the presence of ice floes, the ships frequently required assistance from icebreakers. Miklouho-Maclay arrived in Kronstadt on April 17.

The destroyer underwent repairs, completed in May. During this time, the Torpedo Division was in political chaos. On May 11, crews passed resolutions for the takeover of power by the "Naval Dictatorship of the Baltic Fleet", which was to organize the defense of Petrograd. This idea did not please the Bolsheviks, who, after arresting division commander A. Shchastny (executed for counter-revolution), began agitation for the official stance of the authorities. This resolution was also adopted by representatives of the Baltic Fleet ships and supported by delegates from Kapitan I ranga Miklouho-Maclay. The Torpedo Division was transformed into the Torpedo Division of the Neva and Lake Ladoga forces, and the ship was included in its IV Division.

In August 1918, the destroyer escorted a minelaying operation to defend Petrograd – covering an area between 60°10′N 28°55′E and 59°57′N 29°10′E. The first phase of laying the minefield began on August 10 at 5:55 AM and extended until 2:32 AM the next day, due to the minelayer Lovat running aground. On the day of laying the minefield, the Russian ship Kolivan sank on it. Kapitan I ranga Miklouho-Maclay went to sea again on August 14, accompanied by Azard, to escort the minelayers Narova and Volga. The Finnish artillery responded to Russian activity near the shore by shelling the destroyers. None of the five shells fired hit the ships, which were about 5.5 km away in the case of Azard and 12 km away in the case of Kapitan I ranga Miklouho-Maclay. The Russian destroyers attempted to shell the land target.

According to Order No. 557 of September 7, Kapitan I ranga Miklouho-Maclay joined the fourth division of the Active Ship Unit (Russian: Действующий отряд кораблей), consisting of technically operational ships. Until the end of World War I, the unit participated in only one more, likely small, mine operation on October 8. The ship then underwent repairs, completed on November 28.

=== Against Estonia and British intervention ===
On 16 December 1918, Kapitan I ranga Miklouho-Maclay joined operations against Estonian-British forces. Together with Azard, it was tasked with scouting the coast of the Gulf of Finland west of Narva-Jõesuu, due to Royal Navy activity off the Estonian coast the previous day. During the patrol, no enemy units were detected.

Immediately following this operation, Kapitan I ranga Miklouho-Maclay underwent routine maintenance. During this period, the crew petitioned for and successfully changed the ship's name to Spartak on December 18.

=== Capture by the Royal Navy ===
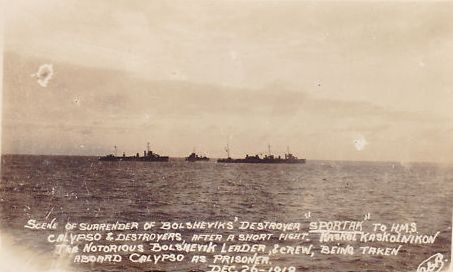
Photo taken during the capture of Spartak by the Royal Navy squadron

Different accounts exist regarding the capture of the destroyers Avtroil and Spartak by the British fleet. Soviet sources indicate that on 25 December 1918, both destroyers were sent to Tallinn to bombard enemy forces there. The next day, they encountered Royal Navy forces consisting of cruisers and destroyers. Shortly after the skirmish began, both destroyers attempted to flee, but mechanical failures after reaching maximum speed led to their being overtaken and damaged by shellfire, forcing their surrender.

Baschkirow and others offer a different perspective. They claim that on December 24, Spartak was supposed to support the 7th Army's operations near Kunda along with the cruiser Oleg and the destroyer Azard. However, due to unfinished repairs, Spartak did not depart with the others. Instead, it sailed later under orders from Fyodor Raskolnikov, aiming to bombard Tallinn (a suggestion from Leon Trotsky). This change of plans, which Raskolnikov did not communicate to other commanders, resulted in Spartak sailing alone. The ship never reached its mission's target, as it encountered a Royal Navy squadron led by Commodore Thesiger en route. HMS Wakeful initiated the pursuit, followed by other British ships. The shellfire was sporadic and failed to hit the target. At 1:30 PM, Spartak attempted to return fire, but a misalignment caused the shot to injure navigator N. Strucki and led to the loss of navigational maps. At 1:40 PM, the destroyer ran aground on Develsey, damaging its screws. Seeing the enemy's plight, the British, who were considering abandoning the chase, closed in and sent a prize crew to board the ship. The British sailors were initially surprised by the filthy condition of the ship and its crew. Their amazement grew when the crew debated whether to follow an order to start the pumps to deal with a leak. The Soviet crew was transferred to a Royal Navy vessel using lifeboats. The damaged Spartak was towed to Tallinn by HMS Vendetta, arriving at 7:00 PM.

Most of the crew was handed over to the Estonians, except for 21 sailors who were kept on HMS Wakeful. The search of the captured ship yielded documents indicating the cruiser Oleg should be near Hogland. In response, the cruisers HMS Calypso, HMS Caradoc, and the destroyer HMS Wakeful set out to eliminate the ship, while other Royal Navy units remained on standby. Not spotting the cruiser near the island, Thesiger decided to attack Avtroil, which the squadron encountered at 2:00 AM. This resulted in the capture of the second Novik class destroyer in good technical condition.

To investigate the loss of both ships, the Revolutionary Military Council (Russian: Революционный Военный Совет) appointed a special commission. According to its report, the main reasons for losing the destroyers were insufficient reconnaissance of enemy forces and poor organization of the operation. Reconnaissance relied solely on a single mission by the submarine Tur, leading to a lack of awareness of the Royal Navy's presence in the Gulf of Finland. The plan itself was not known to all commanders, and its creator, Fyodor Raskolnikov, frequently made changes. Additionally, it was alleged that the destroyers set sail without enough fuel – a claim made by captured crew members but possibly an excuse. Later publications cite other factors such as the poor technical condition of the ships, the politicization of the crews, betrayals by Tsarist officers, Raskolnikov's voluntarism and lack of experience, and the commissars' attitudes.

== Service in Estonia ==
=== Incorporation into the navy ===
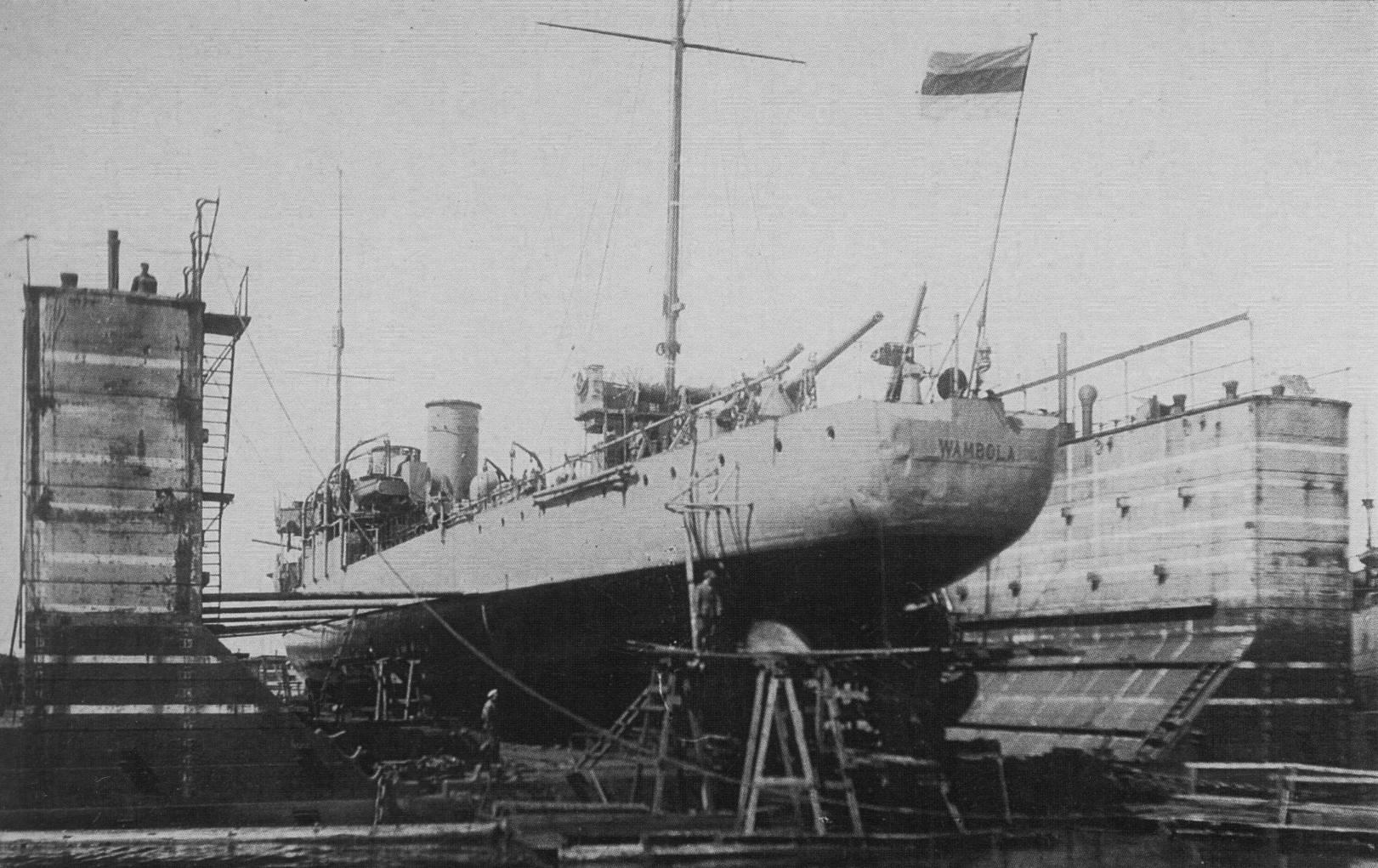
Wambola in the Tallinn shipyard

Initially, the British were undecided about the future of the captured destroyers. The White Russians showed interest in taking them over, but ultimately, it was decided to gift the ships to Estonia. (Note: Kosiarz (1979, p. 384) states that the ships were sold to Estonia.) Before handing them over, the British removed all valuable items from the ships, such as the piano from the Avtroil mess, which ended up on a Royal Navy ship. The ceremonial handover of the destroyers took place on 2 January 1919 at 11:00 AM, when the Estonian flag was hoisted on them. The new ships were classified as torpedo cruisers. Navy Commander Johan Pitka stated that the new name for the Spartak should refer to its old one, and it was decided to name it after an Estonian hero. Since the most popular name, Lembit, was already taken, they chose Vambola – the legendary leader of the Estonians who fought against German invaders in the first quarter of the 13th century. The name change to Wambola (Note: The leader's name was recorded this way before the Estonian language reform. As a result of the reform, the ship's name is sometimes given as Vambola, but during its service, only the version starting with W was used.) was announced on January 4.

The British captured either 126 or 102 people on the Spartak. (Note: Including 7 officers and 95 sailors.) They immediately arrested part of the crews from both ships. Raskolnikov tried to avoid arrest by posing as an ordinary sailor whose documents he had acquired but was recognized by the White officer Oskar Festa, who had attended a course with him. Along with the political commissar of the Avtroil, Nyniuk, they were taken to the United Kingdom and exchanged for 19 British prisoners in May 1919. Officers, non-commissioned officers, and specialists who surrendered on the destroyers were offered service in the Estonian Navy, and some of them accepted. From the Spartak crew, torpedo specialist Łobiński retained his position, and the former commander Pavlinov received another officer position in the Estonian fleet. A total of 30 people from the crews of both destroyers were incorporated into the Estonian Navy at this stage. The remaining sailors were confined in a camp on the island of Naissaar, (Note: Baszkirow et al. (2002, p. 19, part II) use the name Nargån, which appears to be a combination of the Swedish and German names for the island: Nargö and Nargen.) where a selection of Bolsheviks took place on December 3. According to witness A. Konurin, the Estonians ordered all Bolsheviks to step out of the line, and when there was no response, they threatened to shoot every fifth prisoner. 15 sailors responded to this declaration and were executed after interrogation. The fate of the remaining prisoners was to be decided by a tribunal that started its work at the end of January. The tribunal issued 13 death sentences, sentenced 161 people to forced labor (three years for nine individuals, and the rest until the end of the war), placed one person under police supervision, and acquitted 52 sailors. Most of the acquitted joined the military service for half the pay. In 1920, the destroyer crew members were allowed to return to Soviet Russia. Most of those who chose to return were executed during the Great Purge between 1937 and 1939.

The captured destroyer required repairs, so on January 3, it transferred its supplies to Avtroil, renamed Lennuk in its new service, and the next day it was sent to the Noblessner port. Work began within a few days and lasted until February 15. The repaired Wambola was ceremonially launched, and on February 19, it underwent sea trials, which were interrupted due to ice conditions.

The first commander of the ship was J. Paurman, appointed by the commander of the Tallinn port even before confirmation of the Avtroil handover to the Estonians. However, in January 1919, he was replaced by Tijdo Kraus. In December, 18 future crew members joined the ship.

=== Participation in the War of Independence ===
During the fighting on Estonian territory, Wambola remained in the Tallinn port. Its crew was somewhat more active – on March 16, 5 officers and 50 sailors joined the Naval Landing Battalion. Two people were killed in action, and the rest returned to the ship within a month.

The ship was sent to its first combat mission on April 29. Along with Lennuk, it was to lay a minefield between the islands of Gogland and Moshchny. The destroyers were loaded with 102 mines and then set out to sea. At night, at 1:35 AM, the ship collided with ice, damaging the bow and the chip log. Consequently, Wambola returned to Tallinn, arriving around 10:00 AM. The interrupted mission resumed on May 6, under the cover of Royal Navy ships. They laid a total of 202 mines at a depth of 2.4 m. This minefield took its toll in November 1919, when the Red destroyers Gavriil, Konstantin, and Svoboda sank on it.

Wambola returned to the Noblessner port on May 8, where the chip log was repaired. The repair lasted until May 27, when the ship was relaunched. During sea trials on May 28, the ship reached a maximum speed of 29 knots. During the repair, a landing team was formed from the ship's crew – like before, it consisted of 5 officers and 50 sailors, including the ship's commander Kraus. They fought on the northwestern front, collaborating with the minesweepers Kalew and Olev on the Luga river to capture the village of Kuziomkino, but did not stop there. After battles from May 15 to 25, they returned to the ship.

After the repair, the destroyer joined the forces supporting the Northern Corps' march on Petrograd. It headed to Koporye Bay, where fighting was ongoing, on May 30, but returned the same day to pick up an Ingrian detachment, which disembarked in the bay from night till morning. After refueling in Luga Bay on June 1, the ship continued operations in Koporye Bay. From June 4, Rear Admiral Johan Pitka was on board, commanding the fleet's actions from it. On June 6, four Ingrians – Bolshevik deserters – were taken aboard. Over the next day, Wambola suffered two malfunctions. First, on June 6, the steam steering devices broke down. The next day, Lennuk arrived in the bay. The destroyers approached side by side, and Rear Admiral Pitka transferred to the larger of the Noviks. However, at 3:22 PM, when the machines were started, one of the mooring lines blocked Wambola's left propeller. The destroyer headed to Tallinn with one active propeller. There, divers unblocked the propeller by removing the line within a day. Around midnight on June 12, Lennuk entered the port and attempted to moor alongside Wambola. The maneuver did not go smoothly, as the ships brushed sides, damaging Lennuk's accommodation ladder and davits. Wambola once again set off for Koporye Bay, operating there from June 15 to 18.

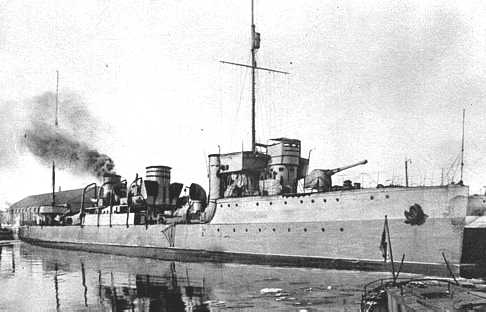
Photo of the destroyer Wambola

Due to the anti-Bolshevik uprising in the Krasnaya Gorka and Seryaya Loshad forts, which began on June 13, the Estonian command decided that the destroyers' support was no longer needed in that area. The ships were redirected to the front against the Baltische Landeswehr. Wambola was the first to enter the Gulf of Riga on June 22. During its departure, the destroyer collided with a tug, causing minor dents in its hull. The ship stopped at Ruhnu island on the morning of March 23. That day, it landed a force in Ainaži, aiming to capture an armored train. The goal was not achieved, and the destroyer fired 12 shells at German positions in Saulkrasti. From June 27 to 29, the ship was anchored at the mouth of the Pärnu river.

Following the Estonian forces' victory in the land Battle of Cēsis, the Baltische Landeswehr began retreating towards Riga. To fully exploit this victory, Johan Pitka prepared a plan to cut off the Germans in the city. It entailed the ships blocking the enemy's access to the city's bridges over the Daugava, aiming to annihilate the Baltische Landeswehr. At 9:00 AM on June 30, Wambola joined the fleet intended to execute this plan, along with Lennuk, Lembit, Olev, and Kalew. At 12:45 PM, the group joined the gunboat Tasuja at the mouth of the Gauja river and anchored. They were spotted by four German aircraft, which did not engage. The group proceeded to the mouth of the Daugava, arriving at 1:45 PM. Minesweepers Olev and Sulev cleared the river of mines. The destroyers followed, with gunboats bringing up the rear. At 3:00 PM, the tug Pernau approached the ships, mistaking them for Swedish food transports. A shot fired at 3:20 PM from Lennuk corrected this misconception. The tug launched a boat, which approached the group, prompting a motorboat launch from Wambola. However, both had to quickly take cover behind Lennuk as rifle fire began. Since Estonian forces advancing towards the city were halted, the ships began to return to their original positions. Detection by enemy aircraft resulted in shelling from the Mangaļsala battery, to which only Tasuja could respond. There is no information on Wambola's actions on July 1, but on the morning of July 2, it, along with the other ships, returned to the mouth of the Daugava. Shortly after 4:00 AM, the ships fired a few shells. At 6:25 AM, a shot came from the Mangaļsala area, about 6.5 km away, to which the Estonian ships responded with fire. Ten minutes later, they began shelling machine gun positions and then enemy ships on the river. Around 9:00 AM, the destroyers opened fire on two German aircraft attacking the gunboat Lembit. A similar situation occurred around 3:50 PM, forcing the pilots to flee before attacking. At 10:55 PM, Lennuk took on some of Wambola's fuel, which set off on its return journey to Tallinn at 7:30 AM on July 3.

After the episode in the Gulf of Riga, the Estonian ships returned to supporting the White offensive on Petrograd. Wambola entered action on August 2, replacing Lembit in patrolling the waters of Koporye Bay. It also patrolled this bay and Luga Bay on the night of August 8/9. The destroyer was again in the combat zone on October 14, participating in the shelling of the Kaliszcze-Ustye area with Estonian and British ships. Its involvement was not very effective, as the ship lacked a proper firing position. In search of one, it entered the firing line of Lembit and Tasuja. Shortly after finding a suitable position, the ships had to retreat due to increasingly accurate fire from the Krasnaya Gorka fort. The destroyer was shelled again on October 16. This time, the Seryaya Loshad fort began firing when a Royal Navy torpedo boat near Wambola opened fire. In the second half of October, Wambola refueled twice in the Björkösund Strait, was in Narva-Jõesuu on November 2, and returned to Tallinn on November 5. The war ended on 3 January 1920.

=== In times of peace ===
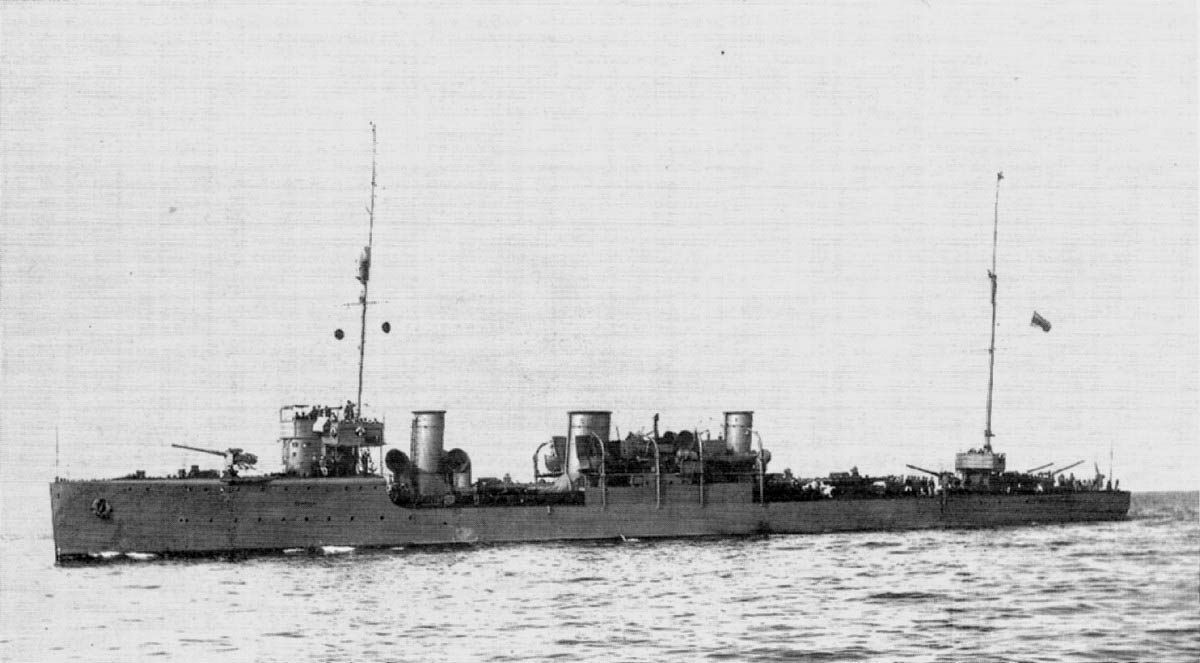
Wambola in 1924

After the war ended, demobilization commenced, beginning with an order issued on 10 February 1920. The first sailors left the Wambola on February 26, and the process concluded by April. With the reduction in personnel, discipline among the crew deteriorated, as evidenced by numerous financial penalties and, in extreme cases, arrests for tardiness. During the first two post-war years, no combat drills were conducted on the ship; these resumed in 1922 and continued annually during the summer months.

Wambola undertook its first foreign journeys to Finland, visiting in October 1920 and again on 27 May 1923 along with Lennuk and the ship Kungla to represent the Estonian Navy at a parade marking the unveiling of a monument to Finnish volunteers in the Estonian War of Independence.

In 1923, the destroyer visited Gdynia, participating in the grand opening of the Polish naval base, where it hosted President Stanisław Wojciechowski.

The ship made two visits to Latvia: the first as part of a training cruise in 1925, and the second in 1929 when it accompanied Lennuk and Sulev on an official visit to Liepāja from August 4 to 8.

Wambola also traveled to Sweden in August 1928, delivering Jaan Tõnisson, the elder statesman of Estonia, along with Lennuk.

=== Sale of the ship ===
==== Negotiations ====
Initial offers to purchase the Estonian destroyers appeared as early as 1920, with the Polish Navy expressing interest. Naval Captain Mieczysław Bereśniewicz visited Tallinn on November 13 to inspect the destroyers. However, the British, reluctant to strengthen the Polish Navy, preferred to persuade Finnish Navy to buy the ships. The Finns, not interested, left the ships with Estonia.

The idea of selling the ships resurfaced during the Great Depression when maintenance costs became too high for the small nation. Initial talks with the company Ludwig Bing u.Ko in August 1931 proposed a sale price of 2,225,000 Estonian kroons. However, due to allied obligations to Finland, Estonian defense minister Herman von Salza decided the only acceptable option was to sell the destroyers to the Finns. An offer of 1.55 million Estonian kroons was made, but the Finns declined due to economic constraints, choosing to invest in air and land forces instead.

In early 1933, new interested buyers emerged: Colombia and Peru, engaged in the war over Leticia on the Amazon. Both nations wanted to expand their naval forces, with Colombia being the first to make an attempt. Using the French firm of Alexander Kliagin as an intermediary, the Colombians conducted negotiations with several European countries. Peruvian intelligence reported these contacts with the Estonians to their government. In this situation, the President of Peru, Sánchez Cerro, insisted on purchasing the Estonian vessels before the Colombians could. Preliminary negotiations with Estonian representatives took place in Brazil.

On April 5, Estonia decided to sell the ships, officially announcing the sale on 11 April 1933. The Ministry of Defense initially planned to scrap the ships for approximately 50,000 Estonian kroons.

Multiple offers followed, but to avoid angering the British, Estonia rejected China's proposal and proceeded with negotiations with Colombia and Peru. Alexander Kliagin represented Colombia, while the Hamburg firm Ludwig Bing u.Ko represented Peru, with negotiations led by former Russian General Dmitri Lebedev. Estonia's side included Defense Minister August Kerem and Chief of Staff Juhan Tõrvand.

Gubin's first offer, made on 4 February 1933, was for $400,000 (approximately 1,492,000 Estonian kroons at the exchange rate of that time). Lebediev proposed $375,000. To determine the exact value of the ships, the Estonians appointed a commission chaired by Paul Gerrets. The commission included Commander Vasili Marson, Lieutenant Commander N. Link, and Navy Captain Johannes Santpank. The result of the commission's work was a breakdown presented on May 5:

| Element | Value in Estonian kroons | Quantity | Total value in Estonian kroons |
|---|---|---|---|
| hull and power plant | 310,000 | 2 | 620,000 |
| 102 mm gun | 55,000 | 9 | 495,000 |
| torpedo launcher | 18,333 | 18 | 330,000 |
| other equipment | 110,000 | – | 110,000 |
| Total | – | – | 1,550,000 |

Despite the higher offer from Colombia, Estonian negotiators leaned towards a deal with Peru, suspecting Kliagin's offer was a ploy to hinder Peru's naval enhancement. The Colombian offer, however, helped Estonia negotiate a higher price with Peru, raising the amount initially to US$387,000 and finally to US$410,000. The Ministry of Defense approved the sale on June 29, and the transaction was completed on 30 July 1933. Estonia received 210,000 pounds sterling, and the ships were officially added to the Peruvian Navy. Wambola was renamed Almirante Villar, and Lennuk became Almirante Guise.

==== Public perception of the transaction ====
The Estonian public learned the first details of the agreement on July 9, when Estonian newspapers reported the sale of the ships for 2,500,000 Estonian kroons. This amount caused public outrage, and the opposition took up the issue, demanding the transaction amount be doubled. The military prosecutor's office also launched an investigation. Although the investigations did not reveal any irregularities, the matter continued to stir public anger. It was brought up during a parliamentary debate on December 19, which led to heated disputes. In 1934, the controversies surrounding the transaction increased. The Italian newspaper Il Popolo d’Italia published information about the transaction, claiming that the intermediary firm Ludwig Bing u.Ko made $340,000 from the deal. When this information reached Estonia, Dmitri Lebediev, the intermediary representative, fled the country but was quickly arrested in Riga by the Estonian police. General Juhan Tõrvand, who led the negotiations, lost his position in the General Staff in February and was expelled from the military on March 7 after a parliamentary debate on the matter. He, along with another negotiator, August Kerem, was accused of corruption. The case dragged on for many months, but on 9 December 1934, both were acquitted. The purchase by intermediaries also caused some controversy in Peru.

The sale of the ships was particularly exploited by the activists of the Vaps Movement, who used it as an example to criticize the corruption of the parliamentary system. This affair somewhat facilitated the success of the proposal for constitutional changes, which was considered in the October 1933 referendum at their request.

The Estonians invested the proceeds in two submarines – what would become the Kalev-class. These submarines became new symbols of national pride, filling the gap left by the sold destroyers.

== Service in Peru ==
=== Journey to the new homeland ===
Colombia did not fall behind Peru's navy; it purchased two Vouga-class destroyers from Portugal: Caldas and Antioquia. Initially, to prevent these units from reaching Colombian shores, there were plans to send the new ships to patrol the Caribbean Sea from French or British supply bases. However, this plan was not realized.

Bringing the purchased Novik-class destroyers to South America was no simple task. This mission was entrusted to Commander Tomaso Pisarro, who led the Destroyer Group. Along with Almirante Villar and Almirante Guise, the tanker Pariñas joined the group, tasked with bringing the crew and supplies to Estonia. The skeletal crews for the ships were formed on July 3. Pariñas departed from Callao on 8 July 1933, and reached the port of Tallinn on August 20. It carried 14 officers and 60 sailors. By that time, the destroyers had been inspected, and on August 22, sea trials were conducted. Almirante Villar made a round trip between Tallinn and Paldiski, reaching a maximum speed of 30.1 knots. The trials were marred by the death of a sailor who drowned after falling overboard. (Note: It was not indicated whether this took place on the Almirante Villar or the Almirante Guise.) The official handover of the ships took place on August 23 at 7:45 PM, with the flags raised on August 24. The ships were to travel to the United Kingdom with mixed crews (including 2 Estonian officers and 28 sailors), allowing the Peruvians to learn about the ships' operations in real-time. The language barrier posed a challenge – even the Estonian translator, Georgij Miagede, only spoke Portuguese.

The ships, seen off by the public, left Tallinn on September 2 at 4:00 PM. They passed through the Kiel Canal and reached Gravesend, England, on September 6. There, the Estonians completed their journey, replaced by Peruvians who had arrived a week earlier on the transport ship Rimac. The ships resumed their journey on September 24. A storm encountered in the Bay of Biscay caused a breakdown in the power plant of Almirante Villar. This provided an opportunity for a demonstration repair conducted in the Spanish port of Ferrol. The ships reached Santa Cruz de Tenerife on October 17 and received new orders upon arriving in São Vicente. Instead of heading to the Peruvian coast, the ships were directed to Iquitos to support the gunboat (Note: Officially classified on the fleet list as a cruiser.) Lima and the torpedo boat Tennente Rodriguez operating there. During the voyage to Belém, Brazil, six stowaways were found on board and disembarked upon arrival at the port on November 9. The ships began their voyage up the Amazon on December 21, accompanied by the steamer Perene, and reached their destination on 3 January 1934. By then, peace negotiations between Peru and Colombia were already underway, culminating on May 24 with Leticia being placed under the mandate of the League of Nations. In this context, the destroyers could proceed to Peru's main port, Callao. The ships departed for Belém, then headed to Port of Spain, and subsequently to Fort-de-France, where the underwater part of their hulls was repaired. They transited the Panama Canal, refueled in Talara on July 2, and completed their journey in Callao three days later. During the voyage, the main problem of the destroyers became apparent: the lack of a cooling chamber and poor ventilation, which were not issues in their original service conditions, but overall, the opinion of the new acquisitions was positive.

=== In times of peace ===
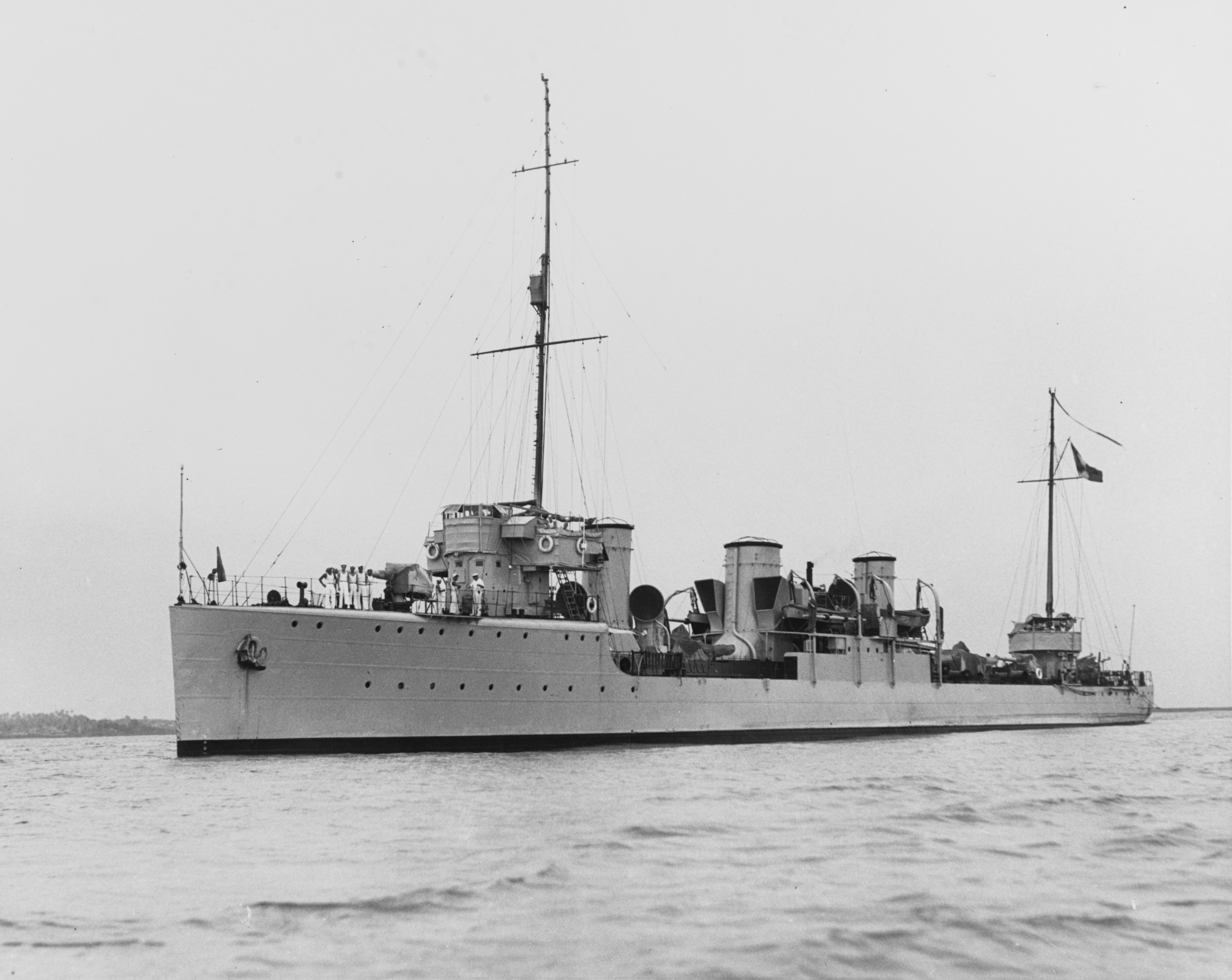
Almirante Villar in 1934

In 1935, between January and March, a group of ships comprising Almirante Villar, Almirante Guise, Almirante Grau, Rimac, R-3, and R-4 visited nine Peruvian ports. In 1936, the destroyers, along with Almirante Grau and Pariñas, underwent repairs in Panama. In 1937, a training voyage was conducted to Talcahuano, Chile, where the underwater parts of the hulls were maintained. In 1938, the activity of the destroyers was limited to a trip to Talara during the first two months. No data is available for 1939, while in 1940, the Noviks, together with Almirante Grau and Coronel Bolognesi, visited ten Peruvian ports. Throughout most of these years, the ships participated in gunnery exercises, most frequently held in the Gulf of Guayaquil.

=== War with Ecuador ===
In 1941, Peru found itself at war with Ecuador. Given the significant superiority over the enemy's navy, Peruvian command decided to actively utilize its ships. Almirante Villar was assigned to patrol the Zorritos area. The mission began on July 7, and after two days, the ship entered the port of Talara. It stayed there until July 23, when it was tasked with conducting a reconnaissance patrol in the Puerto Pizarro area.

The only naval battle of this campaign involving Almirante Villar took place on July 25. On that day, the ship was ordered to attack an Ecuadorian convoy heading to Puerto Bolivar, shielded from the sea by the islands of the Jambelí Archipelago. The destroyer left Puerto Pizarro at 7:29 AM, crossed into enemy territorial waters at 10:55 AM, and seven minutes later, the crew spotted a vessel moving north from the channel separating the islands from the mainland. Due to the lack of a flag and sunlight reflections, the ship could not be identified. After accelerating and closing the distance to 6 km, the crew identified the target as the Ecuadorian gunboat Abdon Calderon, a 19th-century vessel. The enemy also noticed Almirante Villar, turned toward the shore, and raised the Ecuadorian flag. The Peruvians opened warning fire at 11:19 AM. The Ecuadorian vessel returned fire. As the ship approached shallow waters, the captain of Villar maneuvered to avoid running aground while trying to find a favorable position to fire. A total of 41 shots were fired, with two shells landing close enough to be considered hits by the Peruvians. When Abdon Calderon hid behind the islands' forest, the Peruvians continued firing based on the smoke from its funnels. Fire ceased at 11:40 AM, and the destroyer headed back to Puerto Pizarro, arriving at 3:00 PM. Ecuadorian reports claimed Almirante Villar received 25 hits and left the battlefield towed by Almirante Grau and Tennente Rodriguez, but these ships were actually in Callao and Iquitos, respectively. The skirmish had no military significance, though each side was satisfied with its perceived outcome.

From July 30 to September 18, 1941, Almirante Villar participated with other Peruvian ships in patrolling border waters from Talara in the south to the northern end of the Jambelí Archipelago. On August 3, it ventured into the channel waters between the archipelago and Puerto Bolivar. Almirante Villar concluded its participation in the campaign on September 29, when it received orders to return to Callao.

=== Final years of service ===
After Peru declared war on the Axis powers, the navy was tasked with patrolling the northern coast. Almirante Villar participated in this duty, painted in two shades of gray to create the illusion of a larger ship. In 1944, submarine chasers acquired from the United States took over this task, significantly reducing operational costs.

In the first half of 1948, the ship participated in a training cruise. Later that year, the crew mutinied as part of a broader rebellion. The ship was seized on October 3, but attempts to use it were thwarted by engine and cooling system failures and bent propeller blades. The damaged ship underwent extensive repairs and was placed in reserve. In 1949, Almirante Villar participated in another training cruise. At the end of July 1952, the destroyer was transferred to the naval academy, but due to its poor technical condition, it was decommissioned on 15 September 1954.

== Commemoration ==
On 11 December 1940, the authorities of the Estonian SSR decided to commemorate the crew members of the destroyers Spartak and Avtroil who were executed by the Estonians on the island of Naissaar. The inscription on the monument was to read:

Here lie the remains of 36 sailors from the destroyers 'Spartak' and 'Avtroil', barbarically executed on the island of Nargån between 3 and 5 February 1919.

The sailors' remains were exhumed and transferred to Tallinn, where they were ceremoniously reburied on Maarjamäe Hill. This site became part of a larger memorial complex commemorating Estonian Bolsheviks after 1975. Since the Estonians had actually killed 27 sailors, some of the coffins were filled with wood as substitutes.
