= Soviet destroyer Karl Marx =

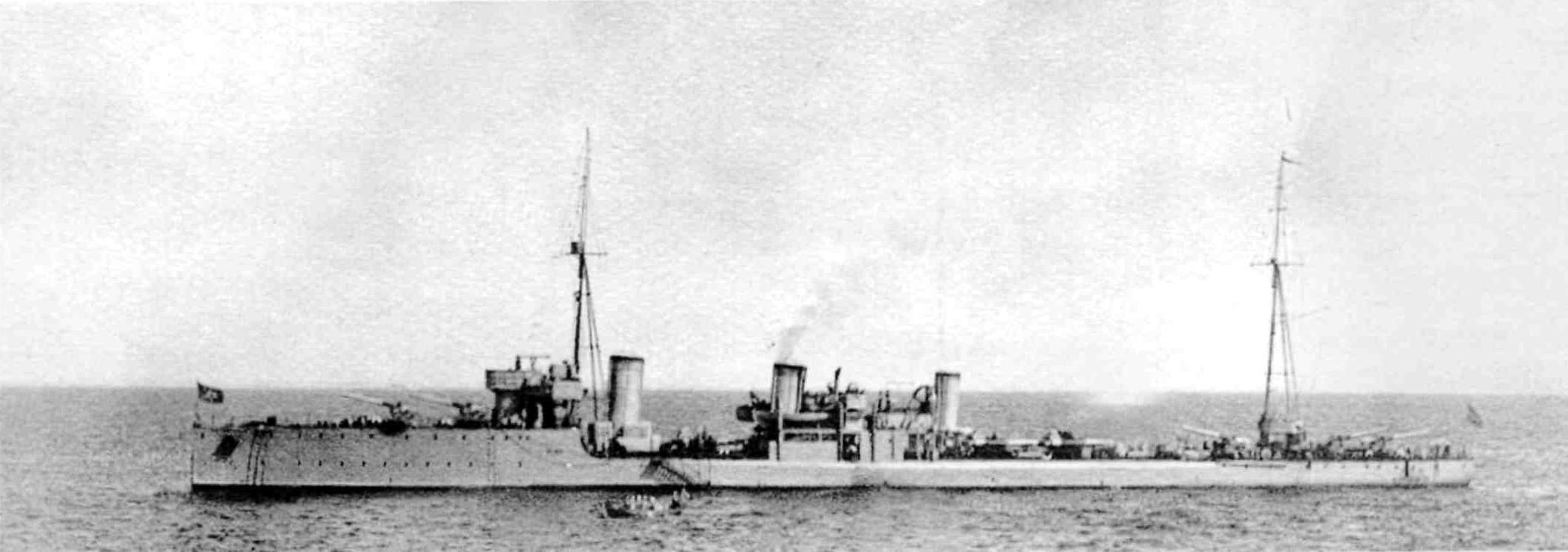

History

Russian Empire
- Name: Izyaslav (Изяслав)
- Builder: Böcker and Lange, Reval, Estonia
- Laid down: 1913
- Launched: 27 June 1915
- Completed: 1916

Soviet Union
- Acquired: 1918
- Commissioned: 1922
- Renamed: Karl Marx (Карл Маркс), 1922
- Fate: Sunk by German aircraft, 8 August 1941

General characteristics (as built)
- Class & type: Izyaslav-class destroyer
- Displacement: 1,390 long tons (1,410 t)
- Length: 107 m (351 ft 1 in)
- Beam: 9.5 m (31 ft 2 in)
- Draught: 4.1 m (13 ft 5 in)
- Installed power: 5 Normand boilers; 32,700 shp (24,400 kW)
- Propulsion: 2 shafts; 2 steam turbines
- Speed: 31 knots (57 km/h; 36 mph)
- Range: 1,880 nmi (3,480 km; 2,160 mi) at 21 knots (39 km/h; 24 mph) (estimated)
- Complement: 150
- Armament: 4–5 × single 4 in (102 mm) guns; 3 × triple 17.7 in (450 mm) torpedo tubes; 1 × 2.5 in (64 mm) AA gun; 1 × 3 in (76 mm) Lender AA gun; 80 mines

Izyaslav (Russian: Изяслав) was the lead ship of her class of five destroyer flotilla leaders built for the Russian Imperial Navy during the 1910s. Completed during 1916, she served with the Baltic Fleet during the remainder of the First World War, and after the October Revolution joined the Bolshevik Red Fleet.

== Design and description ==
The Izyaslav-class ships were designed to serve as flotilla leaders for the Novik-type destroyers. The ships normally displaced 1,390 long tons (1,410 t) and 1,570–1,590 long tons (1,600–1,620 t) at full load. They measured 107 meters (351 ft 1 in) long overall with a beam of 9.5 meters (31 ft 2 in), and a draft of 4.1 meters (13 ft 5 in). The Izyslavs were propelled by two steam turbines, each driving one propeller using steam from five Normand-Vulcan boilers. The turbines were designed to produce a total of 32,700 shaft horsepower (24,400 kW) for an intended maximum speed of 35 knots (65 km/h; 40 mph). During the ships' sea trials, they only reached 31.7–31.8 knots (58.7–58.9 km/h; 36.5–36.6 mph) despite outputs of 34,975–35,700 shp (26,081–26,621 kW). The ships carried enough fuel oil to give them an estimated range of 1,880 nautical miles (3,480 km; 2,160 mi) at 21 knots (39 km/h; 24 mph). Their crew numbered 150.

The Izyaslav-class ships were originally intended to have an armament of two single four-inch (102 mm) Pattern 1911 Obukhov guns, one each at the bow and stern, and a dozen 450-millimeter (17.7 in) torpedo tubes in six double mounts. The Naval General Staff changed this to four triple mounts once they became available and then decided to remove a torpedo mount in exchange for another four-inch gun at the stern on 20 August 1915 while the ships were still under construction. Another gun was ordered to be added on the forecastle on 25 May 1916. Izyaslav was completed with this gun armament, but her sister ships had another gun added on the stern in April 1917. All of these guns were on the centerline and interfered with each other's movements. Anti-aircraft defense was provided by a 2.5-inch (64 mm) Pattern 1916 anti-aircraft (AA) gun and a 3-inch (76 mm) Lender AA gun, both in single mounts amidships. The Izyaslavs were completed with one triple torpedo mount between the forward funnels and two mounts aft of the rear funnel. They could carry 80 M1912 naval mines. They were also fitted with a Barr and Stroud rangefinder and two 60-centimeter (24 in) searchlights.

== Construction and career ==
Ordered from Böcker and Lange's shipyard in Reval, Estonia, in the 1912 naval program, Izyaslav was active during the Russian Civil War, taking part in several engagements against British ships during the British campaign in the Baltic. The destroyer was renamed Karl Marx (Russian: Карл Маркс) in 1922. She played a small role in the Winter War with the Soviet Baltic Fleet when Germany invaded the Soviet Union in 1941 (Operation Barbarossa), and was sunk by German aircraft on 8 August 1941.

The ship was blown up by Soviet torpedo boats on 12 August 1941. The wreck of the ship was eventually scrapped in the 1950s. Only small remnants are left of it in the sea.

== Bibliography ==
- Apalkov, Yu. V. (1996). Боевые корабли русского флота: 8.1914-10.1917г [Combat Ships of the Russian Fleet: 8.1914-10.1917] (in Russian). Saint Petersburg, Russia: ИНТЕК. ISBN 5-7559-0018-3.
- Breyer, Siegfried (1992). Soviet Warship Development: Volume 1: 1917–1937. London: Conway Maritime Press. ISBN 0-85177-604-3.
- Budzbon, Przemysław (1985). "Russia". In Gray, Randal (ed.). Conway's All the World's Fighting Ships 1906–1921. Annapolis, Maryland: Naval Institute Press. pp. 291–325. ISBN 0-85177-245-5.
- Budzbon, Przemysław (1980). "Soviet Union". In Chesneau, Roger (ed.). Conway's All the World's Fighting Ships 1922–1946. Greenwich, UK: Conway Maritime Press. pp. 318–346. ISBN 0-85177-146-7.
- Budzbon, Przemysław; Radziemski, Jan & Twardowski, Marek (2022). Warships of the Soviet Fleets 1939–1945. Vol. I: Major Combatants. Annapolis, Maryland: Naval Institute Press. ISBN 978-1-68247-877-6.
- Hill, Alexander (2018). Soviet Destroyers of World War II. New Vanguard. Vol. 256. Oxford, UK: Osprey Publishing. ISBN 978-1-4728-2256-7.
- Rohwer, Jürgen (2005). Chronology of the War at Sea 1939–1945: The Naval History of World War Two (Third Revised ed.). Annapolis, Maryland: Naval Institute Press. ISBN 1-59114-119-2.
- Verstyuk, Anatoly & Gordeyev, Stanislav (2006). Корабли Минных дивизий. От "Новика" до "Гогланда" [Torpedo Division Ships: From Novik to Gogland] (in Russian). Moscow: Voennaya Kniga. ISBN 5-902863-10-4.
- Whitley, M. J. (1988). Destroyers of World War 2. Annapolis, Maryland: Naval Institute Press. ISBN 0-87021-326-1.
