= 102 mm 60 caliber Pattern 1911 =

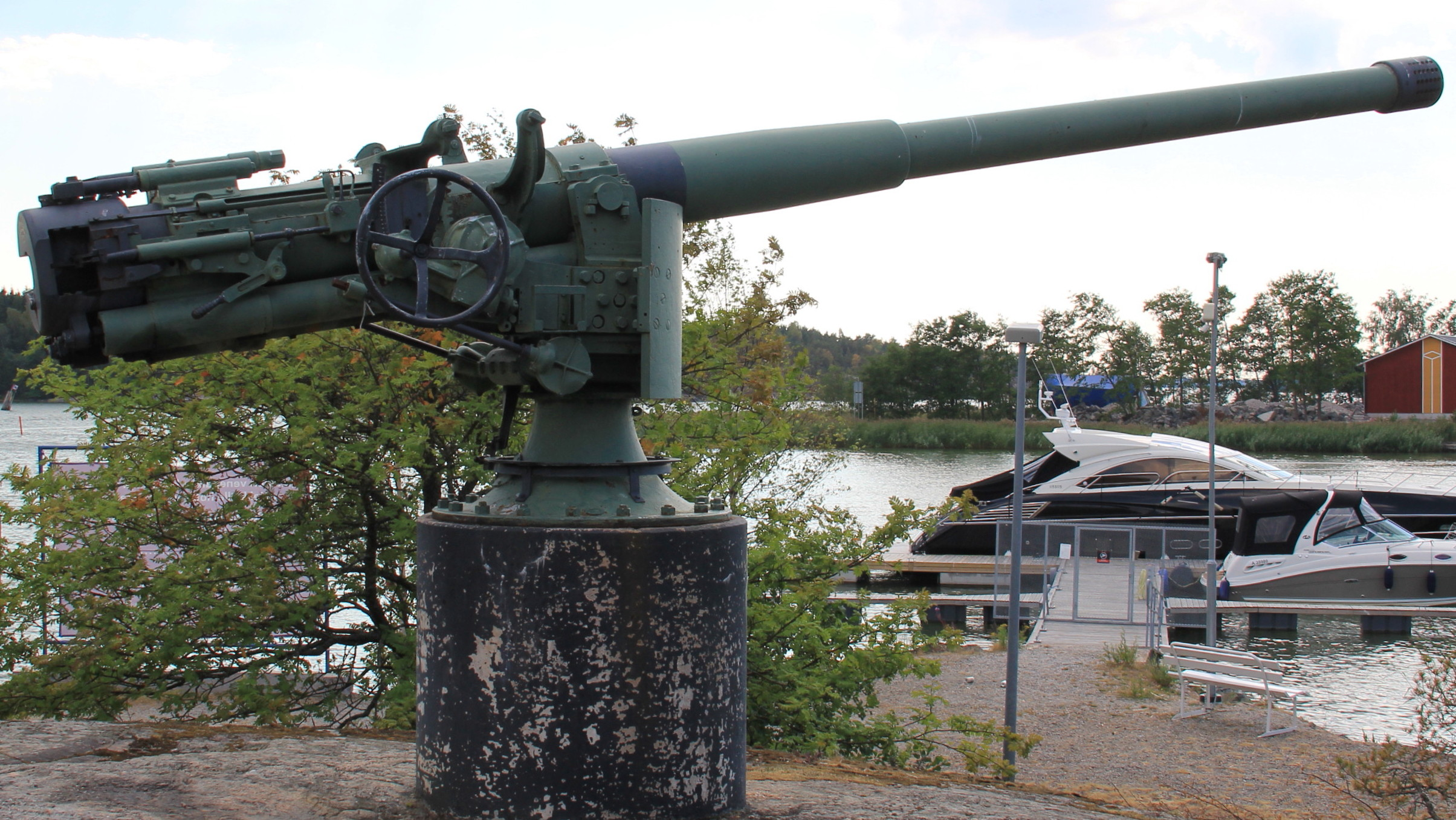
- Coastal Defense Memorial Uusikaupunki
- Type: Naval gun Railway gun Coastal artillery
- Place of origin: Russian Empire

Service history
- Used by: Russian Empire; Soviet Union; Bulgaria; Estonia; Finland; Peru
- Wars: World War I Russian Civil War; Winter War; World War II

Production history
- Designer: Vickers
- Designed: 1908
- Manufacturer: Obukhov; Perm
- Produced: 1911

Specifications
- Mass: 2,850 kg (6,280 lb)
- Length: 6 m (19 ft 8 in)
- Barrel length: 5.2 m (17 ft 1 in) 60 caliber
- Shell: Fixed QF 101.6 x 790mm R ammunition 30 kg (66 lb)
- Shell weight: 17.5 kg (39 lb)
- Caliber: 102 millimeters (4.0 in)
- Action: Semi-automatic
- Breech: Horizontal wedge breech
- Elevation: -10° to +30°
- Traverse: 360°
- Rate of fire: 12-15 rpm
- Muzzle velocity: 823 m/s (2,700 ft/s)
- Effective firing range: 16 km (9.9 mi) at +30°

The 102 mm 60 caliber Pattern 1911 was a Russian naval gun developed in the years before World War I that armed a variety of warships of the Imperial Russian Navy during World War I. Pattern 1911 guns found a second life on river gunboats and armored trains during the Russian Civil War and as coastal artillery during World War II. In 1941 it was estimated that 146 guns were in service. Of these, 49 were in the Baltic Fleet, 30 in the Black Sea Fleet, 30 in the Pacific Fleet, 18 in the Northern Fleet, 9 in the Caspian Flotilla and 6 in the Pinsk Flotilla.

== History ==
The requirement to re-equip destroyers of the Imperial Russian fleet with guns larger than the current 75 mm 50 caliber Pattern 1892 was raised by the chief of the Baltic Fleet Mine Division, Nikolai Ottowitsch von Essen, in January 1907. The design for the new gun was completed with technical assistance from the British Vickers company at the Obukhov State plant in 1908 and testing was completed in August 1909.

== Construction ==
Pattern 1911 guns were produced at the Obukhov state plant and the Perm artillery factory between 1911 and 1921. In 1911 an order for 505 guns was placed of which 225 were delivered by January 1, 1917. Another 200 were expected to be produced during 1917 and 83 in 1918. In 1921 an order for 85 guns was placed at the Perm factory, but this was reduced to 48 guns. The Pattern 1911 was constructed of an A tube, reinforced by three hoops which were put on while hot and screwed onto the breech. The Pattern 1911 had a high rate of fire 12-15 rpm (10 rpm practical) due to the use of Fixed QF ammunition and a semi-automatic, horizontal wedge breech mechanism. After ejecting each empty case the gun re-cocked itself and kept breech open for the next round. It also had the usual combination of hydraulic buffer and spring recuperator. The original naval mounts were short and had low angles of elevation between -6° and +20°. Latter mounts were taller and had high angles of elevation between -10° and +30°.

== Naval use ==
Pattern 1911 guns armed a variety of ships such as destroyers, guard ships, gunboats, landing craft, minelayers and torpedo cruisers of the Imperial Russian Navy. After the 1917 October Revolution the successor states of Estonia, Finland, and the Soviet Union all used this gun. Pattern 1911 guns were also used on World War I era destroyers bought by Bulgaria and Peru. Some Romanian cruise ships were lent to Russia in the First World War, to be used as auxiliary cruisers, and equipped with 102 mm Obukhov guns. After the October Revolution most of those ships returned to Romania. In the Second World War, about 3 to 5 guns were used by Romanians as coastal artillery in Sulina & Sf.Gheorghe Black Sea sectors.

Ship classes which carried the Pattern 1911:

- Derzky-class destroyers
- Fidonisy-class destroyers
- Emir Bukharsky-class destroyers
- Gavril-class destroyers
- Okhotnik-class destroyers
- Golub-class guard ships
- Kars-class gunboats
- Kazarskiy-class torpedo cruisers
- Izyaslav-class destroyers
- Orfey-class destroyers
- Shchastlivyi-class destroyers
- Ukraina-class destroyers
- Uragan-class guard ships
- Gaidamak-class destroyers
- Zhemchug-class guard ships

== Ammunition ==
Ammunition was 101.6 x 790mm R and of Fixed QF type. A complete round weighed between 24.5 and 30 kg (54 and 66 lb). The projectiles weighed between 15 and 17.5 kg (33 and 39 lb).

The gun was able to fire:

- Armor Piercing
- Common shell
- High Explosive
- Illumination
- Incendiary
- Shrapnel

== Gallery ==
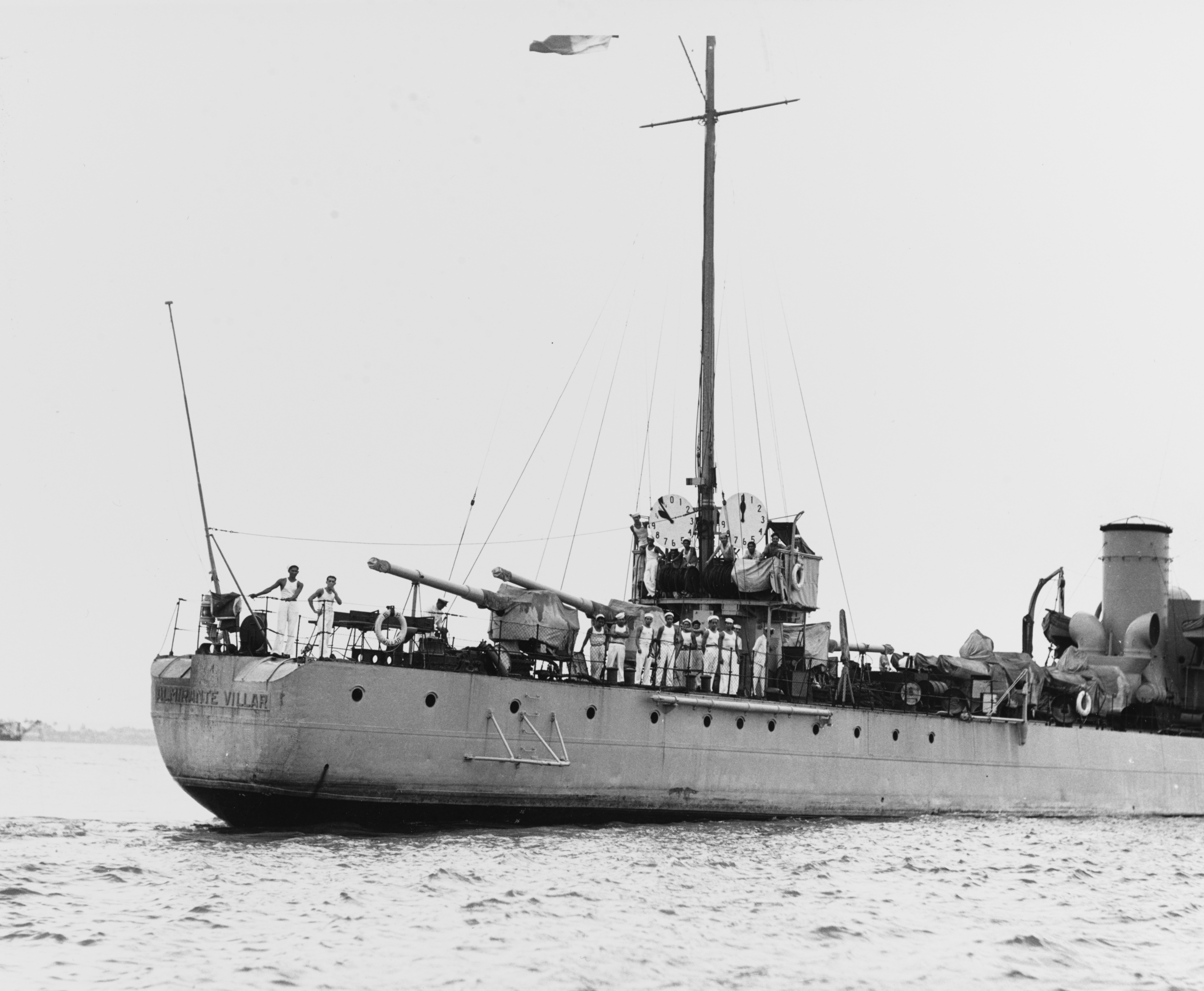
BAP Almirante Villar the former Estonian destroyer Wambola.

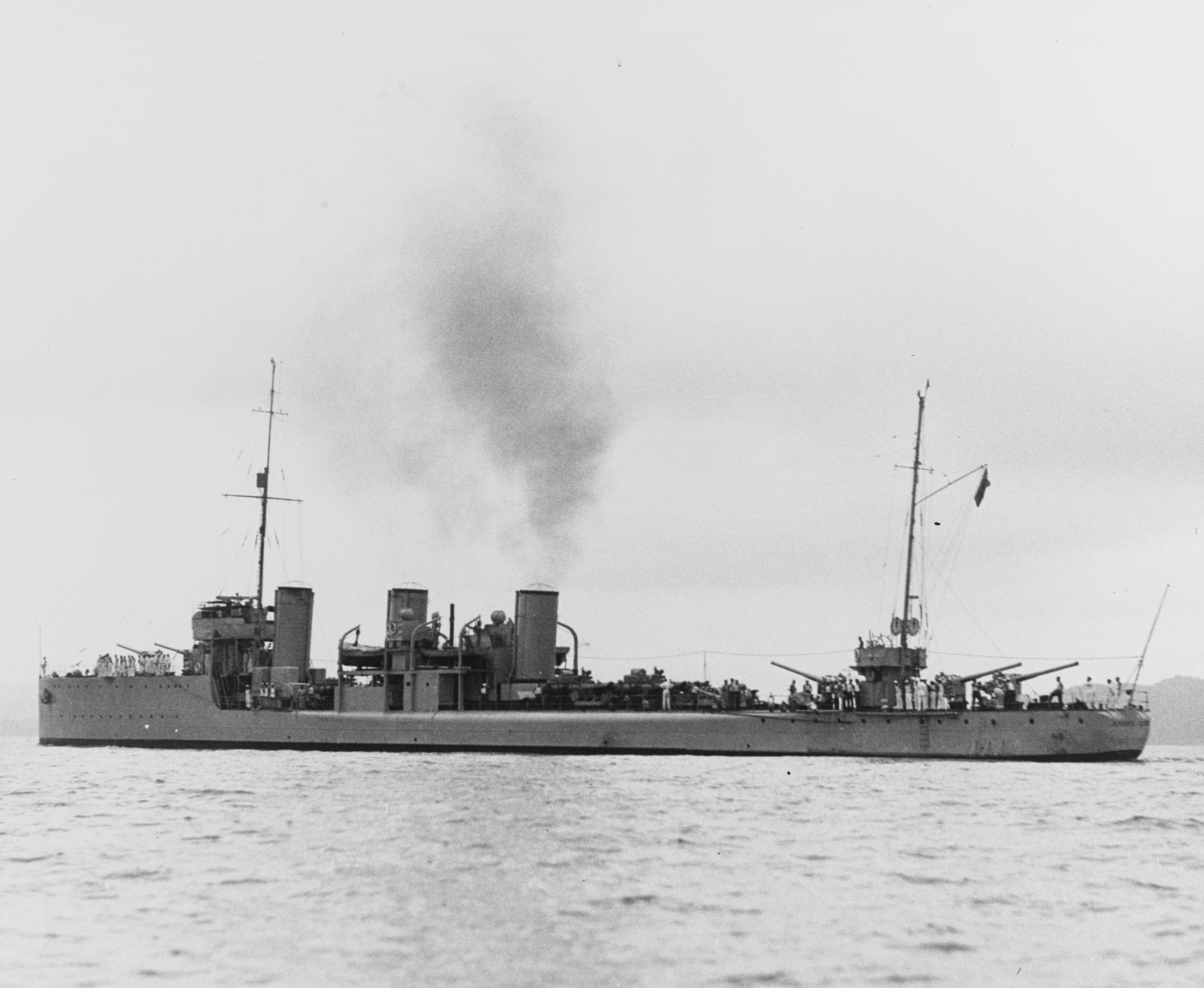
BAP Almirante Guise the former Russian destroyer Avtroil.

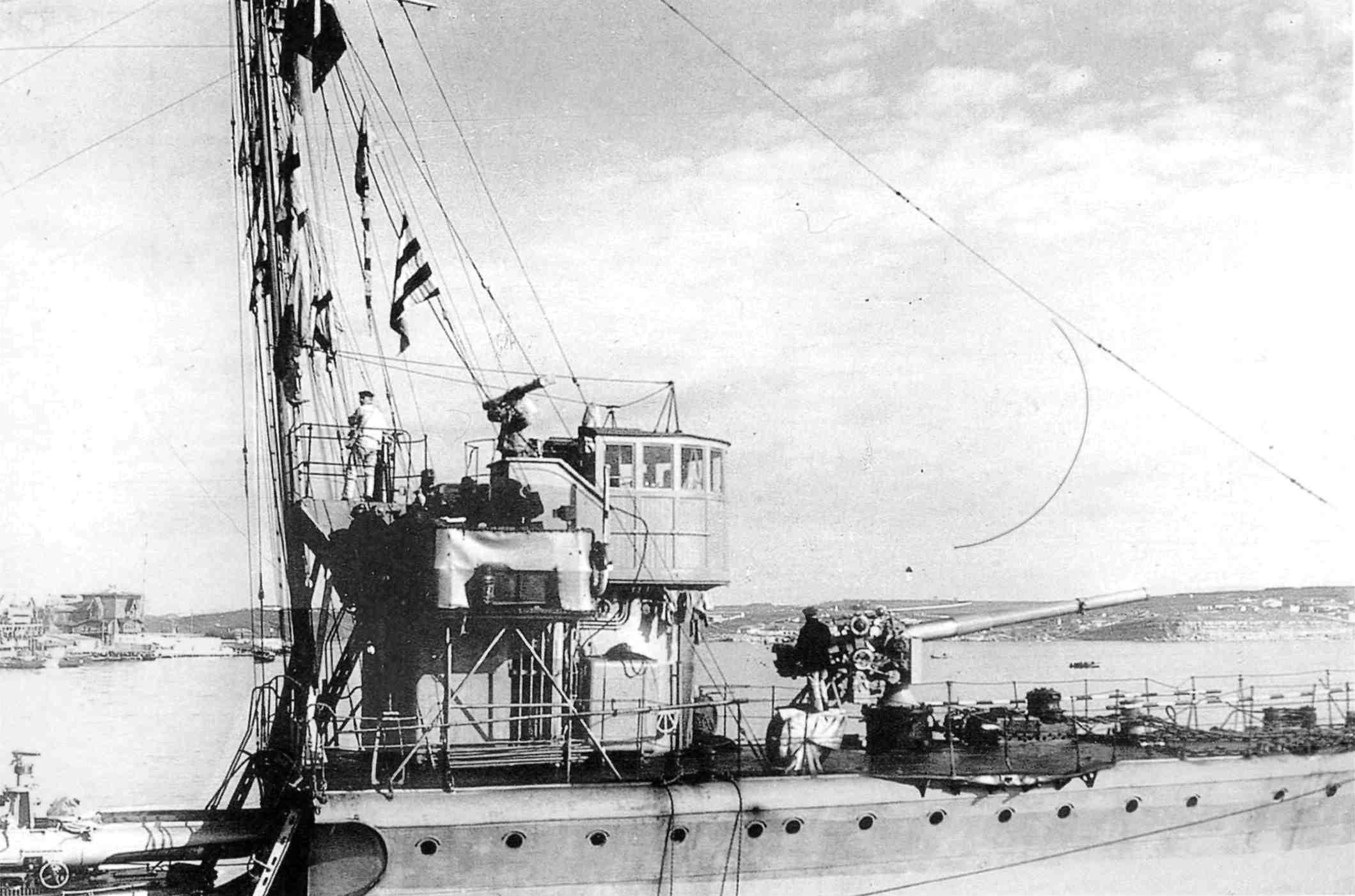
Soviet destroyer Frunze.

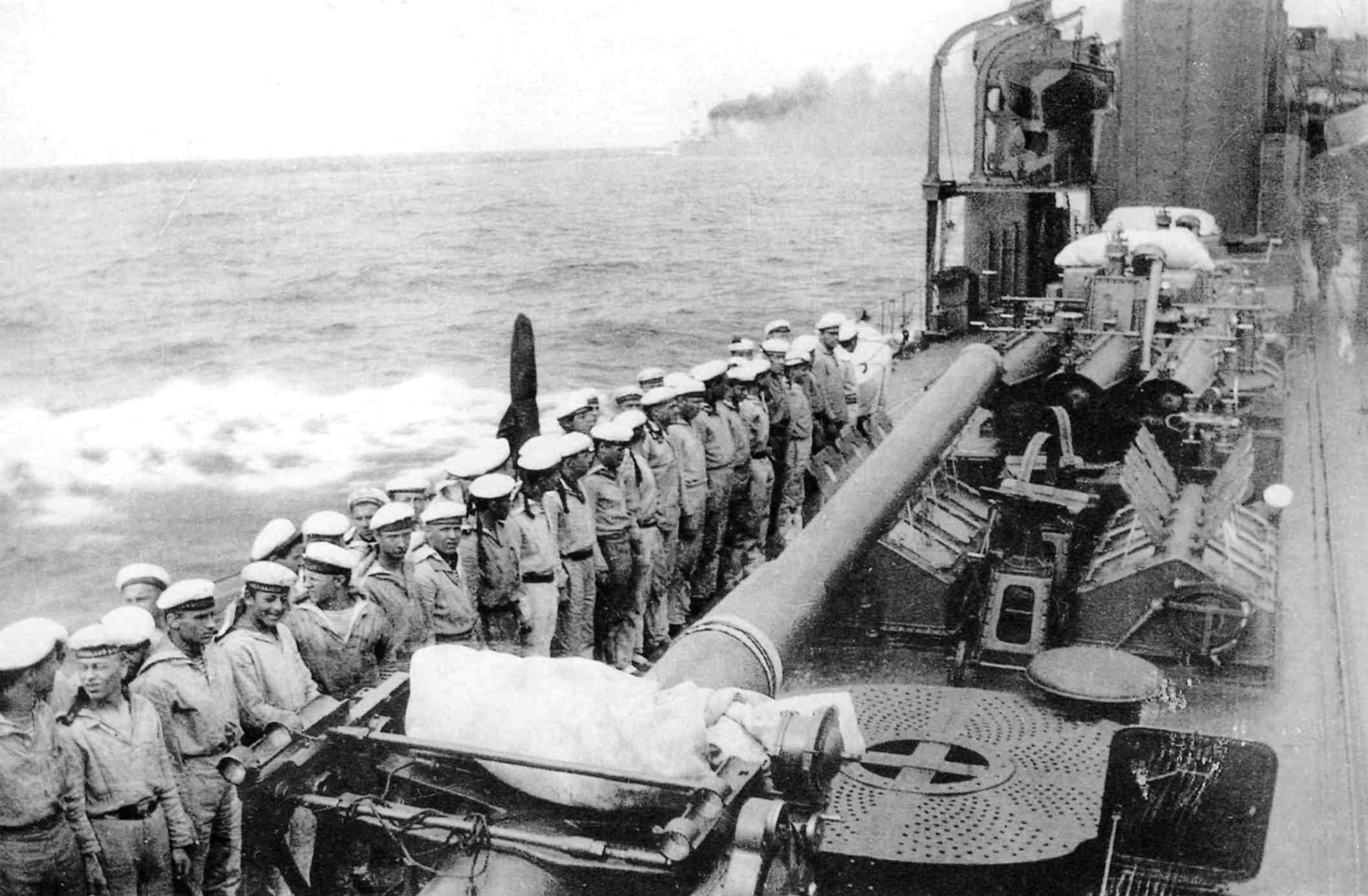
Soviet destroyer Kalinin.

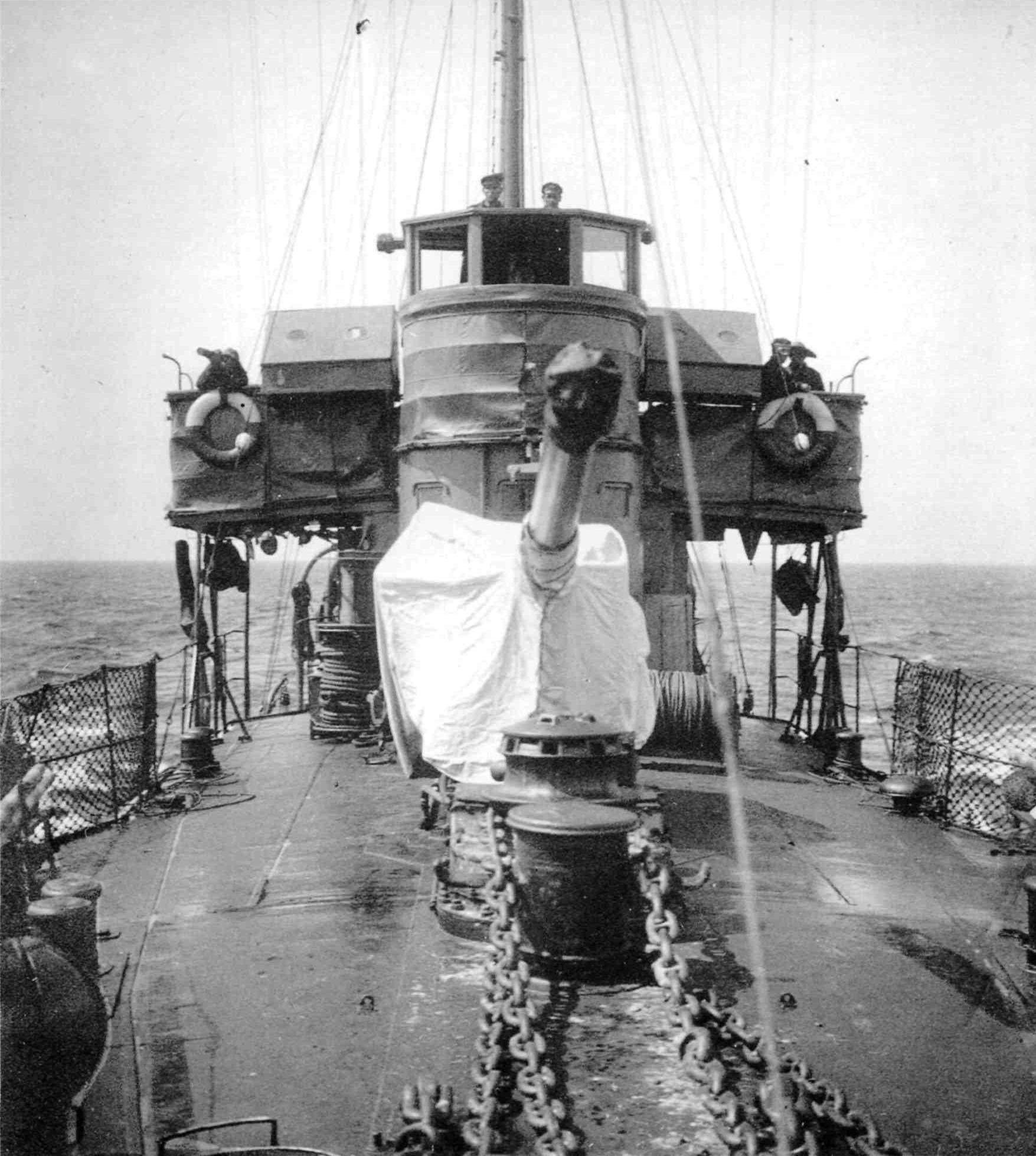
Soviet destroyer Stalin.

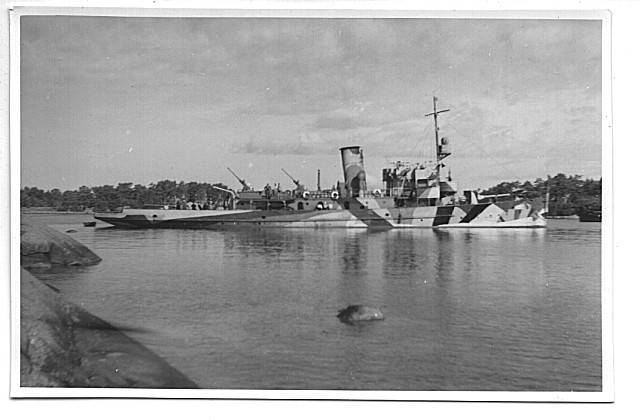
Finnish gunboats Uusimaa or Hameenmaa

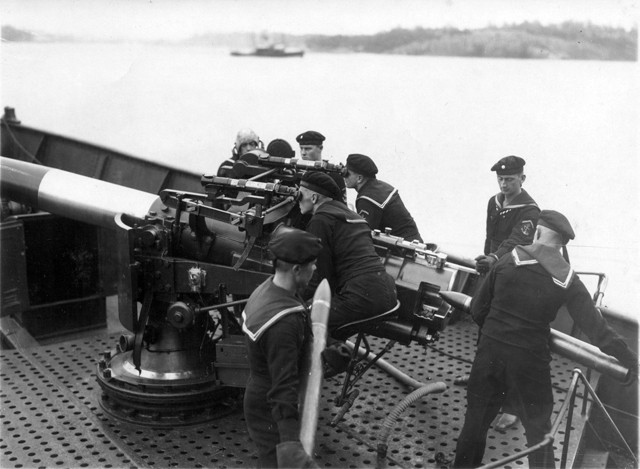
A 102mm gun aboard the Finnish gunboat Uusimaa.
