= Frantz Lender =

Soviet weapon designer (1881–1927)

Frantz Lender (Russian: Франц Францевич Лендер; 24 April [O.S. 12 April] 1881 – 14 September 1927) was a Russian and Soviet weapons designer.
