= 76 mm air-defense gun M1914/15 =

76-mm air-defense gun M1914/15
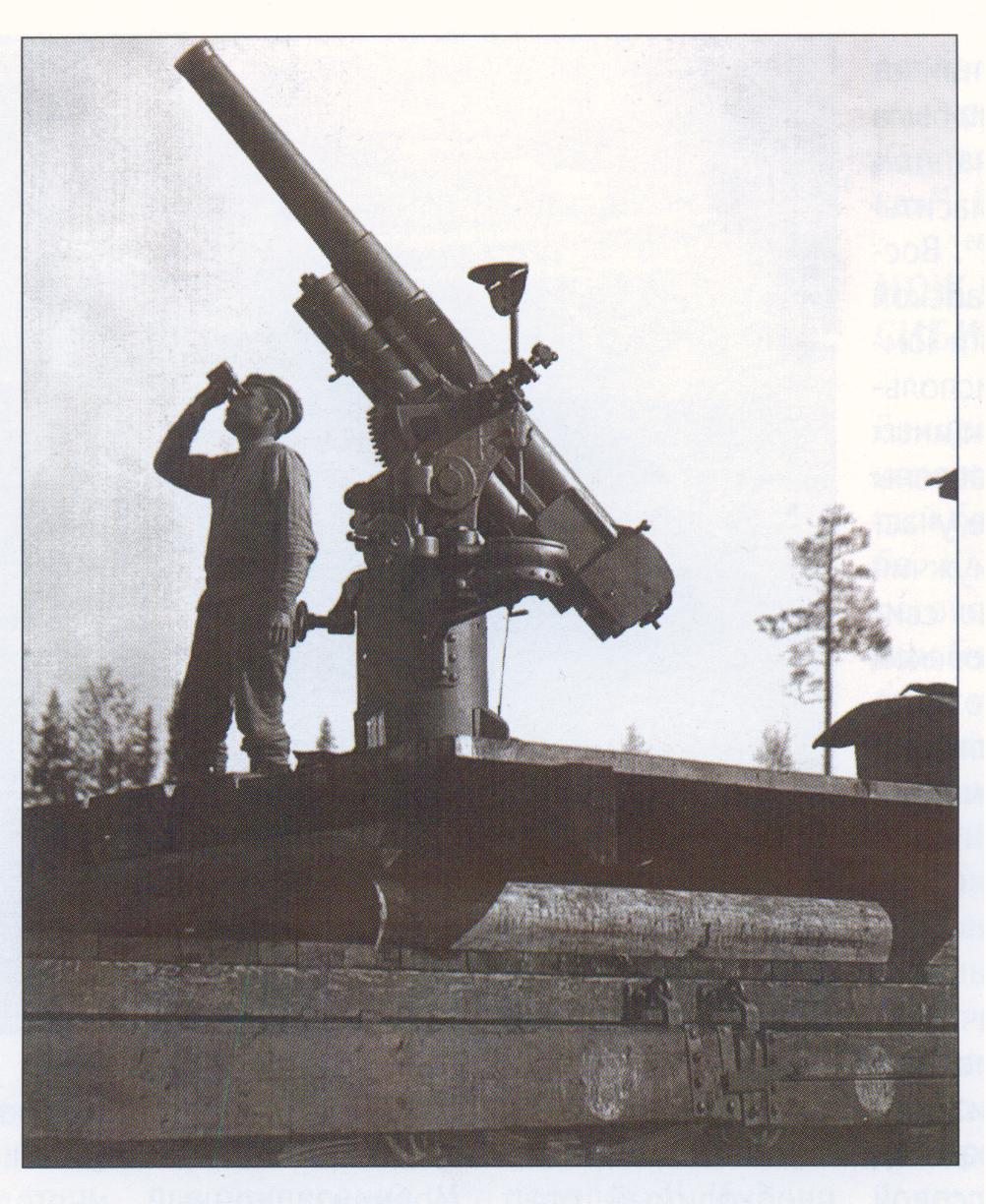
- Type: Anti-aircraft gun Railway artillery Coastal artillery
- Place of origin: Russian Empire

Service history
- In service: 1915–1945
- Used by: Russian Empire; Soviet Union; Finland; Spanish Republic
- Wars: World War I Russian Civil War; Spanish Civil War; Winter War; World War II; Continuation War

Production history
- Designer: VV Tarnovsky; F. F. Lender
- Designed: 1913
- Manufacturer: Putilov plant
- Produced: 1914-1934

Specifications
- Mass: 440 kg (970 lb)
- Length: 2.3 m (7.5 ft)
- Barrel length: 1.79 m (5.9 ft) 30 caliber
- Shell: 76.2 × 385 mm R Fixed QF Ammunition
- Caliber: 76.2 mm (3.00 in)
- Breech: Vertical sliding-wedge breech
- Recoil: Hydraulic
- Carriage: Single AA Mount: 1,300 kg (2,900 lb)
- Elevation: Original: -5° to +65° World War II: -5° to +85°
- Traverse: 360°
- Rate of fire: 10-12 rounds per minute
- Muzzle velocity: 588 m/s (1,930 ft/s)
- Maximum firing range: Horizontal:9.5 km (5.9 mi); AA Range:6 km (20,000 ft)

The 76-mm air-defense gun M1914/15 (Russian: Зенитная пушка обр. 1914/1915 года) was the first Russian purpose-built anti-aircraft gun. Adopted during World War I, the gun remained in production until 1934.

== History ==
On July 13, 1890, at the Ust-Izhora proving ground tethered balloons were fired on during tests. This was the first time aerial targets had been fired on in Russia. In 1901 the military engineer, M. F. Rosenburg, developed a design for the first 57mm anti-aircraft gun, but the idea of a specialized anti-aircraft gun was rejected.

Later in 1908 a 76 mm divisional gun M1902 successfully fired on a moving aerial target, a tethered balloon towed by horses. However many military authorities at the time believed specialized anti-aircraft guns were unnecessary. In particular, the lectures at the General Staff Academy said: "In order to combat aerial targets, special guns with large vertical range and great mobility are needed. Even at modest angles of elevation such as the 16° of the M1902, its shrapnel shells only have a range of 5 versts or 3.31 mi (5.33 km). At an altitude of 1 verst or 3,500 ft (1,100 m), a target will only be within range for 2.5 versts or 8,750 ft (2,670 m). It's possible to expect that aerial targets in the near future will be able to move freely above 1 verst".

In 1908 the idea of creating an anti-aircraft gun was supported by teachers of the Mikhailovsky Artillery Academy. Officers of the school MV Dobrovolsky, EK Smyslovsky, and PN Nikitin developed the technical requirements, while the author of the paper VV Tarnovsky proposed installing the gun on a truck chassis. In the summer of 1913, Tarnovsky completed the design of the gun and the project was approved by the GAU in 1914. Due to political infighting, Tarnovsky was forced to sell his design to the Putilov plant in St. Petersburg and the design was modified by F. F. Lender. The design team also included a well-known artillerist PA Glazkov and workers of the Putilov plant FM Tarkovsky, A. Ya. Navyadovsky and V. I. Biryukov. The Pattern 1914/15 guns were thereafter known as "Lender Guns".

== Construction ==
The early Pattern 1914/15 guns were a built-up design, but in the 1930s production was switched to a barrel with a removable liner. The Pattern 1914/15 was mounted on a central pivot with a hydraulic recoil cylinder underneath the barrel. The Pattern 1914/15 was the first gun to be equipped with a semi-automatic, vertical inertial wedge breech and fired 76.2 × 385 mm R, fixed quickfire ammunition. Pattern 1914/15 guns were able to fire all of the rounds of the Army's M1902 field gun, plus time fuzed AA rounds. At the end of 1914, four prototype guns were installed on trucks and in February 1915 they successfully passed their tests at the St. Petersburg test site. The guns were mounted on either American White Motor Company or Russian Russo-Balt truck chassis.

Production began in August 1914 and twelve guns were produced in the first production lot. An additional twenty guns with the angle of elevation increased from 65° to 75° were produced in 1915 for the Imperial Russian Navy, but none were delivered. The guns were installed on trucks, armored trains, and fixed land mounts instead. By the end of 1917 only 76 guns had been completed, well short of the order the Artillery Inspectors office of the Imperial Russian Army had placed, which stated a minimum requirement of 146 batteries with 584 guns. Production was halted in 1921, but restarted in 1922 and continued until 1934. The Soviet name for the gun was 8-K.

== First combat ==
On March 18, 1915, the first anti-aircraft battery was formed under the command of Captain Tarnovsky at the Officers School in St. Petersburg. The battery was armed with four guns which were mounted on armored truck chassis. The trucks were protected by 3 mm of steel armor, protecting drivers, crew and vital parts of the car from shrapnel and long-range gunfire. Each truck was able to carry its supply of 64 rounds of ammunition. Another four armored trucks served as ammunition carriers with 96 rounds each weighing approximately 327.6 kg (722 lb) and an equal weight of gasoline and oil. There were also three cars for officers and communication teams, 4 motorcycles for scouts and one mobile field kitchen. On March 25, 1915, the battery was sent to the Northern Front. On June 17, 1915, the battery shot down two German aircraft out of a nine aircraft raid in the Pultusk area for the first Russian anti-aircraft victories of the war on the Eastern Front.

== Naval use ==
- Admiral Nakhimov-class cruiser - The Soviet cruiser Krasnyi Kavkaz was originally fitted with four Pattern 1914/15 guns.
- Fidonisy-class destroyers - Three destroyers of this class Nyezamozhnik, Zheleznyakov, and Shaumyan were originally fitted with two Pattern 1914/15 guns. Dzerzhinski received two Pattern 1914/15 guns after a 1929 refit.
- Gangut-class battleships - As built the ships of this class were each armed with a single Pattern 1914/15 gun on the quarterdeck. After 1920–1922 refits three guns were added to the roofs of the end turrets of the three surviving ships.
- Russian cruiser Aurora - The Aurora received four Pattern 1914/15 guns after a 1923 refit.
- Soviet cruiser Komintern - Received 3 or 4 Pattern 1914/15 guns after a 1931 refit.
- Svetlana-class cruiser - The Soviet cruiser Krasnyy Krym at some point in her career is said to have carried nine Pattern 1914/15 guns.

== Foreign users ==
During the Finnish Civil War in 1918 two Pattern 1914/15 guns were captured from the Finnish Red Guards when their armored rail wagon Ukrainski Revolutsija was captured by Finnish White Guards. The guns were unused until 1926 when they became Finland's first anti-aircraft battery. The two guns went on to serve as anti-aircraft and coastal artillery during the Winter War and World War II (Continuation War).

As part of the USSR's support for Republican Spain in the Spanish Civil War, twelve Pattern 1914/15 guns arrived at the port of Alicante on January 18, 1937. Four anti-aircraft batteries of three guns were formed.

== Photo gallery ==
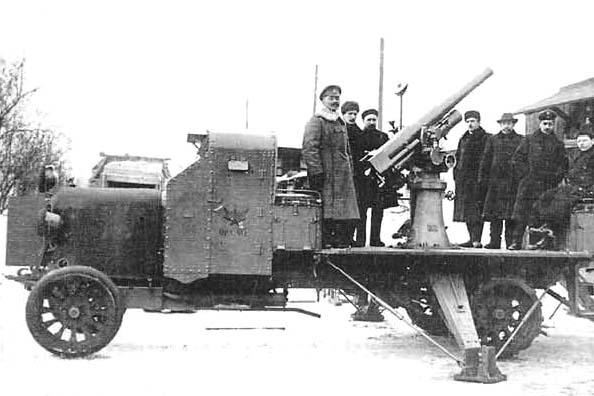
V.V. Tarnovsky (leftmost) at the Guards headquarters with the developers of the first special 76 mm anti-aircraft gun, March 1915.

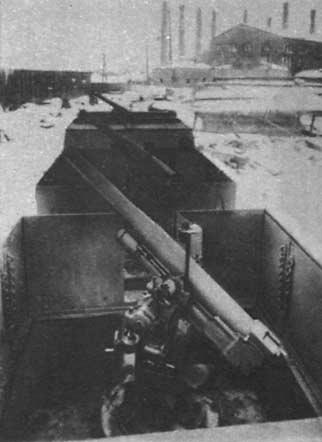
Pattern 1914/15 guns aboard an armored train.

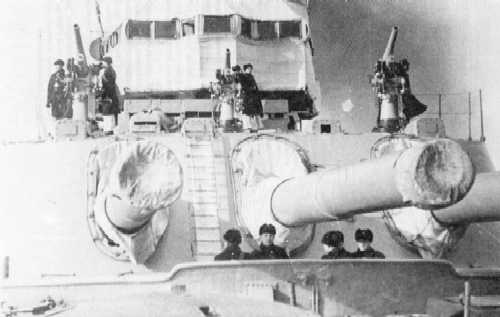
Battleship Marat's 12-inch bow triple gun turret. Three Pattern 1914/15 guns are on the turret roof.

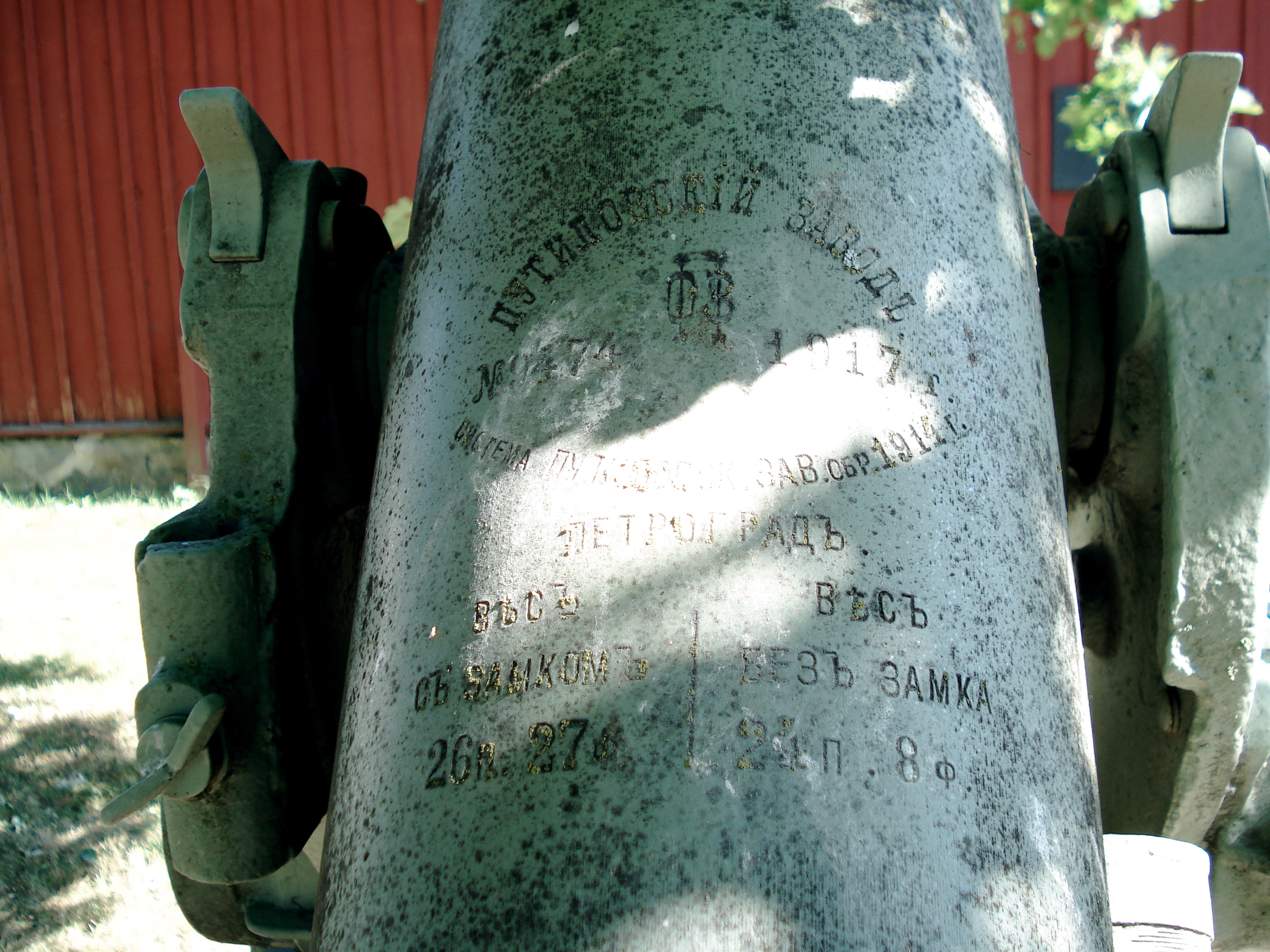
Manufacturers mark on a surviving Pattern 1914/15 gun located in Tuusula Finland.

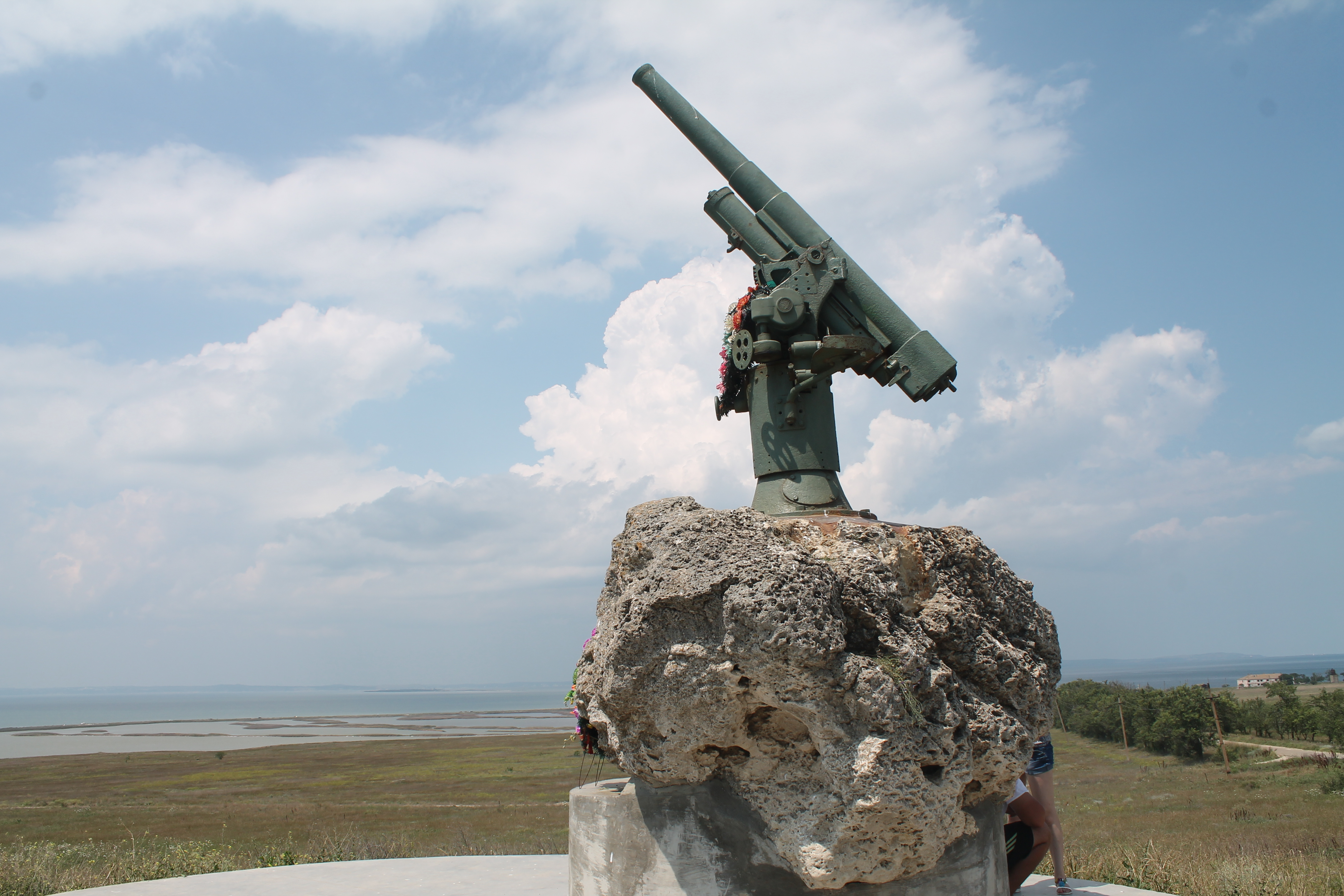
Monument to Soviet paratroopers killed in 1943–1944, on the waters of the Strait of Kerch and Taman Bay in the Battle of Crimea.
