= Russian battleship Imperator Nikolai I (1916) =

Imperial Russian Navy's dreadnought

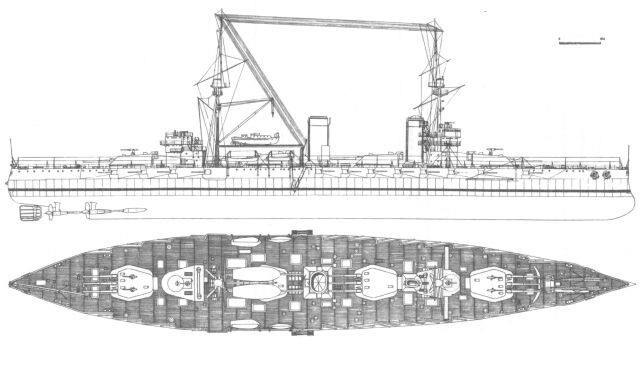
- Plan and side views

Class overview
- Name: Imperator Nikolai I
- Operators: Imperial Russian Navy
- Preceded by: Imperatritsa Mariya class
- Succeeded by: Sovetsky Soyuz class
- Planned: 1
- Canceled: 1

History

Russian Empire
- Name: Imperator Nikolai I
- Namesake: Nicholas I of Russia
- Operator: Imperial Russian Navy
- Ordered: 12 September 1914 (Note: All dates used in this article are New Style)
- Builder: ONZiV, Nikolayev
- Cost: 45,080,000 rubles
- Laid down: 28 April 1915
- Launched: 18 October 1916
- Renamed: Demokratiia (Democracy), 29 April 1917
- Fate: Transferred to the Ukrainian Navy in 1918

Ukraine
- Name: Demokratiia
- Namesake: Democracy
- Operator: Ukrainian Navy
- Renamed: Soborna Ukraina, 25 January 1919
- Fate: Transferred to the Soviet Navy in 1919

Soviet Union
- Name: Soborna Ukraina
- Namesake: Union of Ukraine
- Operator: Soviet Navy
- Renamed: Demokratiia
- Fate: Scrapped beginning 28 June 1927

General characteristics
- Type: Battleship
- Displacement: 27,830 t (27,390 long tons) (standard); 31,877 t (31,374 long tons) (deep load)
- Length: 182 m (597 ft 1 in)
- Beam: 29 m (95 ft 2 in)
- Draught: 9 m (29 ft 6 in)
- Installed power: 20 Yarrow water-tube boilers; 29,700 shp (22,100 kW)
- Propulsion: 4 shafts, 4 steam turbine sets
- Speed: 21 knots (39 km/h; 24 mph)
- Complement: 1,174
- Armament: 4 × triple 12 in (305 mm) guns; 20 × single 130 mm (5.1 in) guns; 4 × single 2.5 in (64 mm) AA guns; 4 × 17.7 in (450 mm) torpedo tubes
- Armor: Waterline belt: 100–270 mm (3.9–10.6 in); Barbettes: 225–300 mm (8.9–11.8 in); Conning tower: 250–400 mm (9.8–15.7 in); Turrets: 200–300 mm (7.9–11.8 in); Decks: 35–63 mm (1.4–2.5 in); Bulkheads: 25–300 mm (1.0–11.8 in)

Imperator Nikolai I (Russian: Император Николай I: Emperor Nicholas I) was a Russian dreadnought built during World War I for service in the Black Sea. She was designed to counter multiple prospective Ottoman dreadnoughts which had been placed under order by the Ottoman government, since this raised the possibility that the Russian dreadnoughts being built for the Black Sea Fleet could be outclassed. The ship used the same main armament as the preceding Imperatritsa Mariya class, but was larger and more heavily armored. Imperator Nikolai I was launched in 1916, but construction was suspended on 24 October 1917. The Soviets considered completing her in 1923, but later rejected the idea. She was towed to Sevastopol in 1927 and scrapped.

== Design and development ==
Imperator Nikolai I was designed in response to efforts by the Ottoman Empire to acquire modern dreadnoughts from abroad. By late 1913 it appeared that the Turks would be able to muster three dreadnoughts, two of which were armed with 13.5-inch (343 mm) guns, versus the three Russian dreadnoughts of the Imperatritsa Mariya class then building. A modified version of that class would be the quickest to put into service and the preliminary design work began in December of that year, well before she was formally ordered on 12 September 1914. She was a much larger and more heavily armored ship than the earlier ships, but her guns and machinery were virtually identical to those of the Imperatritsa Mariya class to save time.

=== General characteristics ===
Imperator Nikolai I was considerably larger than the preceding Imperatritsa Mariya class. She was 182 meters (597 ft 1 in) long overall, had a beam of 29 meters (95 ft 2 in) and a draft of 9 meters (29 ft 6 in) at full load. The ship displaced 27,830 metric tons (27,390 long tons) at normal load, over 3,000 metric tons (3,000 long tons) more than Imperatritsa Mariya's displacement of 23,413 metric tons (23,043 long tons), and 31,877 metric tons (31,374 long tons) at deep load. High-tensile steel was used throughout the hull with mild steel used only in areas that did not contribute to structural strength. The hull was subdivided by 20 transverse watertight bulkheads. The engine room was divided by two longitudinal bulkheads and a centerline bulkhead divided the condenser compartment. The double bottom was 1.2 meters (3 ft 11 in) deep and she was given an ice-breaking bow, probably in the hopes that she'd be able to operate outside the Black Sea. Frahm anti-rolling tanks were fitted on each side to reduce her rolling motion. She had two electrically driven rudders on the centerline, the main rudder abaft the smaller auxiliary rudder. Imperator Nikolai I's designed metacentric height was 1.2 meters (3.9 ft).

=== Propulsion ===
The machinery of Imperator Nikolai I differed only in small ways from that of her predecessors. The wing propeller shafts were powered by high pressure ahead and astern turbines, while the inboard shafts were powered by low pressure turbines. They produced a total of 29,700 shaft horsepower (22,100 kW). 20 mixed-firing triangular Yarrow water-tube boilers powered the turbines with a working pressure of 17.5 atm (257 psi). The forward group of eight boilers were positioned between the first and second turrets while the aft group of twelve boilers lay between the second and third turrets. Maximum speed was estimated at 21 knots (39 km/h; 24 mph). The maximum coal capacity was 3,557.3 tonnes (3,501 long tons), over 1,500 t (1,500 long tons) more than her predecessor's capacity of 2,000 t (2,000 long tons), plus an unknown amount of fuel oil.

Imperator Nikolai I had four Curtiss-AEG main and two auxiliary turbo generators with each driving two dynamos, one each for alternating current and direct current. Each main generator was rated at 360 kW (480 hp) while the auxiliaries had a capacity of 200 kW (270 hp) each. These powered the complex electrical system that combined alternating current for most equipment with direct current for heavy-load machinery like the turret motors. No diesel generators were provided.

=== Armament ===
Her main armament consisted of a dozen 12-inch Pattern 1907 52-caliber guns mounted in four triple turrets distributed the length of the ship. These guns were identical to those used in the Imperatritsa Mariya-class ships, but the turrets were modified to improve the rate of fire. The guns could be depressed to −5° and elevated to 25°. They could be loaded at any angle between −5° and +15°; their rate of fire was supposed to three rounds per minute up to 15° of elevation. The turrets could elevate at 3–4° per second and traverse at a rate of 3.2° per second. 100 rounds per gun were carried at full load. The guns fired 470.9-kilogram (1,038 lb) projectiles at a muzzle velocity of 762 m/s (2,500 ft/s); this provided a maximum range of 23,230 meters (25,400 yd).

The secondary armament consisted of twenty 130-millimeter (5.1 in) 55-caliber Model 1913 guns mounted in casemates. They were arranged in two groups, six guns per side from the forward turret to the rear funnel and the remaining four clustered around the rear turret. Three guns per side were situated to fire ahead as that was the most likely direction of attack by torpedo boats as anticipated by the Naval General Staff. Their rate of fire ranged from five to eight rounds per minute and they were provided with 245 rounds per gun. They had a maximum range of about 15,364 meters (16,802 yd) with a 36.86-kilogram (81.3 lb) shell at a muzzle velocity of 823 m/s (2,700 ft/s).

The original anti-aircraft armament was going to be four 38-caliber 2.5-inch (64 mm) AA guns mounted on the roofs of the fore and aft turrets, but this was changed during construction to four 37-caliber 4-inch (102 mm) of a new design that never entered service. Four underwater 17.7-inch (450 mm) torpedo tubes were also fitted, two on each broadside. Twelve torpedoes were carried for them.

=== Fire control ===
The 6-meter (19 ft 8 in) rangefinders were originally going to be fitted in the conning tower, but this was changed during construction to mounting them in the forward and aft main gun turrets using periscopes in armored hoods on the turret roofs. These would provide data for the central artillery post to calculate and then transmit to the guns for the gun crew to follow. A new, domestically designed, Erikson mechanical computer for the fire-control system was intended to be used.

=== Protection ===
Imperator Nikolai I was much more heavily armored than the Imperatritsa Mariya-class ships, as the weight of armor for the former totaled 2,576 long tons (2,617 t) more than the older ships. Even so, Russian armor factories were unable to roll Krupp cemented armor plates of size greater than 270 millimeters (10.6 in), compensating by increasing the thickness of the internal splinter bulkhead. The plates were sized to match the frames to provide support for their joints and they were joined together to better distribute the shock of a shell's impact. The waterline belt had a total height of 5.2 meters (17 ft), 3.45 meters (11.3 ft) of which was above the design waterline and 1.75 meters (5 ft 9 in) below. Forward, the remaining portion of the waterline was protected by two strakes; the lower of which was initially 200 millimeters (7.9 in) thick, but thinned to 100 millimeters (3.9 in). It extended 90 centimeters (35 in) above the design waterline. The upper strake was 100 mm thick and extended up to the middle deck. Aft, the waterline belt was 175 millimeters (6.9 in) thick and terminated in a 175-mm transverse bulkhead aft of the steering gear. The aft area between the upper and middle decks was the only unarmored area of the hull and had a 300 millimeters (12 in) transverse bulkhead to protect the rear turret magazine from shells fired from rear bearings. The forward bulkhead was only 25 millimeters (0.98 in) to serve as a splinter bulkhead as it was screened at all angles by side or deck armor. The 75 millimeters (3.0 in) upper belt ran from the bow back to the aft turret and was 2.95 meters (9 ft 8 in) high. For the first time it was made of cemented armor which saved 300 long tons (305 t) and 140 long tons (142 t) in comparison to the uncemented plates used on the Gangut and Imperatritsa Mariya classes respectively. Behind the side armor was a face-hardened inboard longitudinal splinter bulkhead that was 75 mm thick between the middle and lower decks, but decreased to 25 mm between the middle and upper decks. This sloped away from the edge of the lower deck to the lower edge of the armor belt with a thickness of 75 mm.

The main gun turrets had a face and rear 300 mm thick with 200 mm sides and roof. The barbettes were 300 mm thick, but reduced to 225–250 millimeters (8.9–9.8 in) when behind other armor. The conning tower sides were 400 millimeters (15.7 in) thick with a 250-mm roof. The funnel uptakes were protected by 75 mm of armor, but reduced to 25 mm between the upper and middle decks. The upper deck was 35 millimeters (1.4 in) thick, which was intended to activate the fuze of any shell penetrating it before it reached the main armored deck that was 63 mm (2.5 in) thick over the armored citadel. Forward of the citadel the upper deck remained 35 mm thick, but aft the armored decks dropped to the level of the top of the waterline belt (the 35 mm deck) while the 63 mm deck was at the lower edge of the belt. Underwater protection was minimal as there was only 10-millimeter (0.39 in) watertight bulkhead behind the upwards extension of the double bottom and even this was squeezed out as the hull narrowed towards the end turrets.

== Construction ==
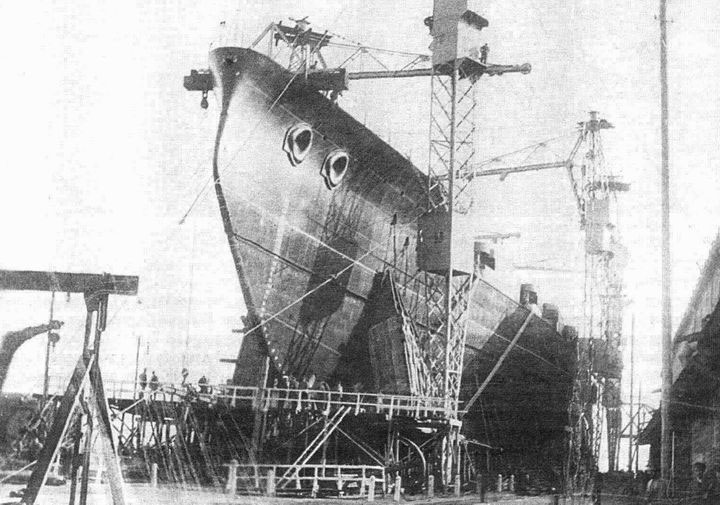
Imperator Nikolai I under construction

Construction began on 22 June 1914 by the ONZiV at Nikolayev, after the launch of Imperatritsa Ekaterina Velikaya on 7 June cleared the building slip. However she was not actually laid down until 28 April 1915 with the intention to launch her in October 1915. The normal building schedule was maintained until early 1915 as the Russians believed that the war would be over soon. However, workers were diverted to more important projects and war production began to interfere with deliveries of material beginning shortly afterwards which delayed her launch until on 18 October 1916. Several proposals were evaluated while she was building to modify her in light of the issues demonstrated by the Imperatritsa Mariya-class in service. They proved to trim badly by the bow and were very wet forward. One proposal was made to fit Imperator Nikolai I with a forecastle deck to improve her seaworthiness. This was rejected, as the additional weight from the forecastle and raising the forward barbette would actually worsen her trim forward. However, a proposal to add a 1.1-meter (3 ft 7 in) bulwark forward was accepted. Work on her continued at a slow rate through the February Revolution of 1917, but the unsettled times disrupted her construction and further delayed her. She was renamed Demokratiya (Russian: Демократия: Democracy) on 29 April 1917 and she was estimated to be about 60% complete. Industrial unrest and strikes further slowed progress and the provisional government postponed further work on 24 October 1917 until "a more favorable time".

She was captured on 17 March 1918 when Nikolaev was occupied by the Germans and Austrians, but they did nothing with her incomplete hull. On 25 January 1919 she was listed by the Directorate of Ukraine as planned to be completed and included into the navy list by 1920. On 27 January 1919 she was mentioned at Directorate Navy Ministry order at the list for renaming from 1920 – into Soborna Ukraina (Russian: Соборна Украина: Union of Ukraine). However, none of the short-lived Directorate orders were actually implemented. She remained at Nikolayev throughout the Russian Civil War, of no use to either side. The victorious Soviets finally inspected her in 1923 to see if she was worth completing. Her dilapidated state and obsolescent design caused them to conclude that it was not worth doing and she should be sold for scrap. Efforts were made to sell the hull abroad to raise hard currency, but when these came to nought she was towed to Sevastopol on 28 June 1927 to begin dismantling.

== Bibliography ==
- Friedman, Norman (2008). Naval Firepower: Battleship Guns and Gunnery in the Dreadnought Era. Annapolis, Maryland: Naval Institute Press. ISBN 978-1-59114-555-4.
- McLaughlin, Stephen (2003). Russian & Soviet Battleships. Annapolis, Maryland: Naval Institute Press. ISBN 1-55750-481-4.
