= Imperatritsa Mariya-class battleship =

Imperial Russian Navy's Imperatritsa Mariya-class dreadnoughts

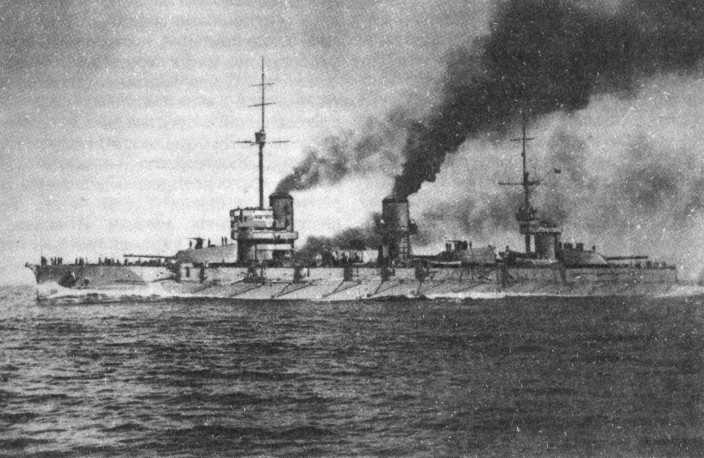
- Imperatritsa Mariya

Class overview
- Builders: Rossud Dockyard, Nikolayev; ONZiV, Nikolayev
- Operators: Imperial Russian Navy; (Russian Soviet Federative Socialist Republic) Red Fleet; Imperial German Navy; (Russia) White Movement
- Preceded by: Gangut class
- Succeeded by: Imperator Nikolai I
- Subclasses: Imperatritsa Ekaterina Velikaya
- Built: 1912–1917
- In commission: 1915–1920
- Planned: 3
- Completed: 3
- Lost: 2
- Scrapped: 1

General characteristics
- Type: Dreadnought
- Displacement: 23,413 long tons (23,789 t)
- Length: 168 m (551 ft 2 in)
- Beam: 27.43 m (90 ft)
- Draft: 8.36 m (27 ft 5 in)
- Installed power: 20 Yarrow boilers; 26,000 shp (19,388 kW)
- Propulsion: 4 shafts; 4 geared steam turbines
- Speed: 21 knots (39 km/h; 24 mph)
- Range: 1,640 nautical miles (3,037 km; 1,887 mi) at 21 knots (39 km/h; 24 mph)
- Complement: 1,154–1,213
- Armament: 4 × triple 12 in (305 mm) guns; 20 × single 130 mm (5.1 in) guns; 3–4 × single 75 or 76 mm (3 in) AA guns; 2 × twin 17.7 in (450 mm) submerged torpedo tubes
- Armor: Waterline belt: 125–262.5 mm (4.92–10.33 in); Deck: 9–50 mm (0.35–1.97 in); Turrets: 250 mm (9.8 in); Barbettes: 250 mm (9.8 in); Conning tower: 300 mm (11.8 in)

The Imperatritsa Mariya-class (Russian: Императрица Мария) battleships were the first dreadnoughts built for the Black Sea Fleet of the Imperial Russian Navy. All three ships were built in Nikolayev during World War I; two of the ships were built by the Rossud Dockyard and the third was built by the Associated Factories and Shipyards of Nikolayev (Russian: ONZiV). Two ships were delivered in 1915 and saw some combat against ex-German warships that had been 'gifted' to the Ottoman Empire, but the third was not completed until 1917 and saw no combat due to the disorder in the navy after the February Revolution earlier that year.

Imperatritsa Mariya was sunk by a magazine explosion in Sevastopol harbor in 1916. Imperatritsa Ekaterina Velikaya, having been renamed Svobodnaya Rossiya in 1917, was scuttled in Novorossiysk harbor in 1918 to prevent her from being turned over to the Germans as required by the Treaty of Brest-Litovsk. The crew of Volia, as Imperator Aleksandr III had been renamed in 1917, voted to turn her over to the Germans. They were only able to make one training cruise before they had to turn her over the victorious Allies in 1918 as part of the armistice terms. The British took control of her, but turned her over to the White Russians in 1920 who renamed her General Alekseyev. She only had one operable gun turret by this time and she provided some fire support for the Whites, but it was not enough. They were forced to evacuate the Crimea later that year and sailed with Wrangel's fleet to Bizerte (Tunisia) where she was interned by the French. She was eventually scrapped there during the 1930s to pay her docking fees.

== Design and development ==
The Naval Ministry began planning a class of dreadnoughts for the Black Sea Fleet in 1910 when they learned that the Ottomans were on the verge of ordering dreadnoughts of their own from the British. This rumor proved to false, but the Russians had decided that they should continue the design process for the time when the Ottomans did procure dreadnoughts of their own. Preliminary specifications were issued on 12 August 1910 (Note: All dates used in this article are New Style) for a design based on that of the Gangut-class battleships then being built for the Baltic Fleet. 23 knots (43 km/h; 26 mph) was thought to be excessive in the confined environs of the Black Sea so the new design was capable of only 21 knots (39 km/h; 24 mph) which allowed more weight to be devoted to more guns or heavier armor. A main armament of a dozen 12-inch (305 mm) guns in four triple turrets was specified in the same 'linear' non-superfiring arrangements as the Ganguts. The sixteen 120-millimeter (4.7 in) anti-torpedo boat guns of the Ganguts were replaced by twenty 130-millimeter (5.1 in)/55 B7 Pattern 1913 guns to counter the ever-increasing size of torpedo boats. The maximum elevation of the 12-inch guns was to be increased to 35°, 10° more than in the Gangut-class ships, and turret armor was to be increased from 200 mm (7.9 in) to 250 mm (9.8 in).

A design competition was announced in July 1911, but there were not many contenders. The Naval Ministry favored the design from the Russud Works and gave preliminary orders for three ships on 2 September, even before the competition was concluded in November. Russud's design was unsurprisingly selected and the government transferred designers from the government-owned Baltic Works as well as a complete set of drawings for the Gangut-class to speed up the detailed design process.

=== General characteristics ===
The ships of the Imperatritsa Mariya-class were 168 meters (551 ft 2 in) long overall, had a beam of 27.43 meters (90 ft 0 in) and at full load a draft of 8.36 meters (27 ft 5 in). They displaced 23,413 long tons (23,789 t) at (standard). High-tensile steel was used throughout the hull with mild steel used only in areas that did not contribute to structural strength. The hull was subdivided by 18 transverse watertight bulkheads. The engine room was divided by two longitudinal bulkheads and a double bottom was provided. Their designed metacentric height was 1.76 meters (5 ft 9 in).

Imperatritsa Ekaterina Velikaya was slightly larger than her half-sisters because ONZiV enlarged her in an effort to counter the usual problem Russian battleships had with weight. She was 168 meters (551 ft 2 in) long at the waterline and had a beam of 28.07 meters (92 ft 1 in); 4 feet 10 inches (1.47 m) longer and 2 feet (0.61 m) wider than her half sisters. Her exact draft is not known, but she had a draft of 8.7 meters (28 ft 7 in) on trials. Her displacement was 24,644 long tons (25,039 t) at load, over 900 long tons (914 t) more than her designed displacement of 23,783 long tons (24,165 t).

Imperatritsa Mariya proved to be very bow-heavy in service and tended to ship large amounts of water through her forward casemates. The ammunition for the forward 12-inch guns was reduced from 100 to 70 rounds each while the 130 mm ammunition was reduced from 245 to 100 rounds per gun in an attempt to compensate for her trim. This did not fully cure the problem, but Imperatritsa Mariya was lost before any other changes could be implemented. This did not fully cure the problem so Volia's, as she was known by then, forward pair of 130 mm guns were removed while she was fitting out. Imperatritsa Ekaterina Velikaya did not suffer from the same degree of trim by the bow by virtue of her greater size and retained her forward guns.

=== Propulsion ===
The two Russud-built ships were fitted with four Parsons-type steam turbines imported from John Brown & Company of the United Kingdom while Imperatritsa Ekaterina Velikaya's turbines were built by ONZiV with technical assistance from Vickers Limited. They were designed for a total of 26,000 shaft horsepower (19,388 kW) (27,000 shp (20,134 kW) in Imperatritsa Ekaterina Velikaya), but produced over 33,000 shp (24,608 kW) on trials. 20 mixed-firing triangular Yarrow water-tube boilers powered the turbines at a working pressure of 17.5 atm (1,773 kPa; 257 psi). Their designed speed was 21 knots. Their maximum coal capacity ranged from 1,700 to 2,300 long tons (1,727 to 2,337 t) plus 420 to 630 long tons (427 to 640 t) of fuel oil which gave them a range of approximately 1,640 nautical miles (3,037 km; 1,887 mi) at full speed or 2,960 nautical miles (5,482 km; 3,406 mi) at economical speed. All of their electrical power was generated by three main Curtis 360 kilowatt turbo generators and two 200 kilowatt auxiliary units.

=== Armament ===
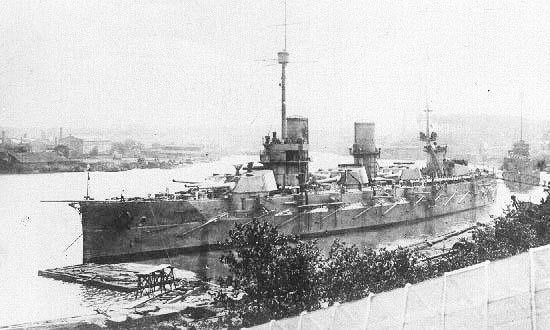
Imperator Aleksandr III

The main armament of the Imperatritsa Mariya-class consisted of a dozen Obukhovskii 12-inch (305 mm) Pattern 1907 52-caliber guns mounted in four triple turrets distributed the length of the ship. The guns were identical to those used in the Gangut-class ships, but the turrets were of a new and roomier design. The fore and aft turrets could traverse a total of 310° while the middle turrets covered an arc of 130° on each side. The guns could be depressed to −5° and elevated to 25° and could be loaded at any angle between −5° and +15°; their rate of fire was supposed to three rounds per minute up to 15° of elevation. The turrets could elevate at 3–4° per second and traverse at a rate of 3.2° per second. 100 rounds per gun were carried at full load. The guns fired 470.9-kilogram (1,038 lb) projectiles at a muzzle velocity of 762 m/s (2,500 ft/s); this provided a maximum range of 23,230 meters (25,400 yd).

The secondary armament consisted of twenty 130-millimeter (5.1 in)/55-caliber B7 Pattern 1913 guns mounted in casemates. They were arranged in two groups, six guns per side from the forward turret to the rear funnel and the remaining four clustered around the rear turret. Three guns per side were situated to fire ahead as that was the most likely direction of attack by torpedo boats as anticipated by the Naval General Staff. Their rate of fire ranged from five to eight rounds per minute and they were provided with 245 rounds per gun. They had a maximum range of about 15,364 meters (16,802 yd) with a 36.86-kilogram (81.3 lb) shell at a muzzle velocity of 823 m/s (2,700 ft/s).

No anti-aircraft (AA) armament was originally planned. In October 1916, the Naval Ministry specified that four 37-caliber 4-inch (102 mm) guns of a new design were to be fitted, but they never entered service. The two older ships had three or four 50-caliber 75-millimeter (3 in) Pattern 1892 guns mounted on turret roofs. The 75 mm gun had maximum elevation of 50°. It fired a 12.63-pound (5.73 kg) shell at a muzzle velocity of 2,450 ft/s (750 m/s) at a rate of fire of 12–15 rounds per minute. It had a maximum ceiling of less than 16,000 ft (4,900 m). Volia used four of the newer 30-caliber 76.2-millimeter (3 in) 'Lender' AA guns, mounted on the fore and aft turrets. This had a maximum depression of 5° and a maximum elevation of 65°. It fired a 14.33-pound (6.50 kg) shell at a muzzle velocity of 1,929 ft/s (588 m/s). It had a rate of fire of 10–12 rounds per minute and had a maximum ceiling of 19,000 ft (5,800 m).

Four underwater 17.7-inch (450 mm) torpedo tubes were also fitted, two on each broadside in a compartment immediately abaft the forward magazine. Imperatritsa Mariya's trials revealed problems with her magazine cooling systems where the heat generated by the ventilation system mostly negated the cooling effects of the refrigeration system. Her sisters shared this problem, which may have contributed to the magazine fire suffered by Imperatritsa Mariya that led to her loss in 1916.

The two older ships mounted Zeiss 5-meter (16 ft 5 in) rangefinders on each conning tower, but Volia was given four 18-foot (5.5 m) Barr and Stroud rangefinders, one for each turret. These would provide data for the central artillery post to calculate, using the standard Geisler mechanical computer, and then transmit to the guns for the gun crew to follow.

=== Armor ===
The full-scale armor trials with the hulk of the old pre-dreadnought battleship Chesma greatly affected the armor protection of the Imperatritsa Mariya-class ships. The Krupp cemented armor plates were sized to match the frames to provide support for their joints and they were locked together by a type of mortise and tenon joint to better distribute the shock of a shell's impact. The waterline belt had a maximum thickness of 262.5 millimeters (10.33 in). It was continued forward and aft of the citadel by plates 217 millimeters (8.5 in) and 175 millimeters (6.9 in) thick. These reduced to 125 millimeters (4.9 in) and then to 75 millimeters just before the bow. Aft the belt thinned to 125 millimeters all the way to the stern. It had a total height of 5.25 meters (17.2 ft), 3.5 meters (11 ft) of which was above the design waterline and 1.75 meters (5 ft 9 in) below. It was backed by 75 millimeters of wood to make a better fit between the hull and the armor. The forward end of the citadel was protected by other armor and the transverse bulkhead was therefore only 25.4 millimeters (1.00 in) thick, barely enough to consider as splinter protection. However, the rear bulkhead had no other protection and was 100 millimeters (3.9 in) thick. These thin bulkheads left the end magazines very vulnerable to shells fired from bearings in front of or behind the ship. The upper belt was 100 millimeters (3.9 in) thick and had a height of 2.7 millimeters (0.11 in). It thinned to 75 mm forward of the casemates all the way to the bow. The casemates were also protected by a 25 millimeters (0.98 in) transverse bulkhead from axial fire as well as a 25 mm screen between each casemate. Behind the side armor was an inboard longitudinal splinter bulkhead that was 50 millimeters (2.0 in) thick, but the casemates had their own separate 25 mm splinter bulkhead.

The main gun turrets had sides 250 millimeters (9.8 in) thick with 125 mm roofs. 50 mm plates protected the gun ports and 25-millimeter (0.98 in) bulkheads separated each gun. The barbettes were 250 mm thick, but reduced to 125 mm below the upper deck, except in the forward and rear turrets which thinned only to 150 millimeters (5.9 in). The forward conning tower sides were 300 millimeters (11.8 in) thick with a 200 millimeters (7.9 in) roof and 250 mm supporting tube which reduced to 100 mm below the upper deck. The rear conning tower also had 300 mm sides and a 250 mm support tube, but the roof was only 100 mm thick. The funnel uptakes were protected by 75 mm of armor above the upper deck, but this reduced to 19 millimeters (0.75 in) below it. The upper deck was 37.5 millimeters (1.48 in) thick while the middle deck was 25 mm thick over the armored citadel. Outside the citadel the middle deck was 37.5 mm thick and the lower deck was 25 mm thick. Underwater protection was minimal as there was only an unarmored watertight bulkhead behind the upwards extension of the double bottom.

== Construction ==
All three ships were laid down on 30 October 1911, but this was just a ceremonial event as the design had not yet been finalized nor the contracts signed. A contract was finally signed on 13 April 1912 with Russud that specified delivery dates of 2 September 1915 for both Imperatritsa Mariya and Imperator Aleksander III. Imperatritsa Ekaterina Velikaya was built to a larger design that added over two million gold rubles to her cost and delayed the start of her construction three months after her half-sisters. Despite the demanding schedule the ships suffered from a number of delays during construction. On 10 February 1914 changes were ordered by the Naval Ministry to incorporate the lessons learned from the full-scale armor trials conducted using the Chesma. This added almost 500 long tons (508 t) of weight to the ships and raised their cost by 220,000–250,000 rubles. Other delays were incurred after the war began as imported components took longer to reach the shipyards and factories switched over to war production. The construction of Imperator Aleksander III was deliberately delayed in order to accelerate the completion of her two sisters and some of her turrets were transferred to Imperatritsa Mariya as well.

== Service history ==
=== Imperatritsa Mariya ===
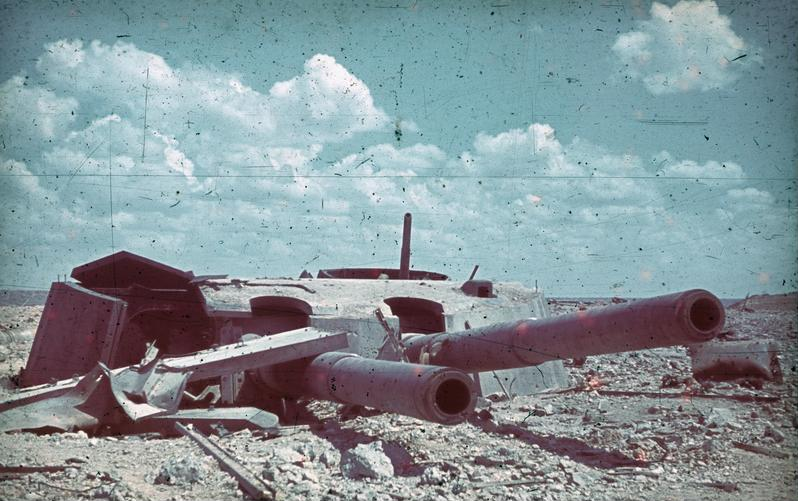
Remains of Imperatritsa Mariya's guns, which were used to defend Sevastopol during World War II

Imperatritsa Mariya (Russian: Императрица Мария, "Empress Maria") was launched on 19 October 1913 and arrived in Sevastopol on 13 July 1915, where she completed her fitting out during the next few months and conducted sea trials. She provided cover while the pre-dreadnought battleships conducted shore bombardment missions in October 1915. She encountered the ex-German light cruiser Midilli twice during 1916, but the cruiser escaped with nothing more than splinter damage. On 20 October 1916, she capsized and sank in Sevastopol harbor after a magazine fire and subsequent explosion. Following a complex salvage operation, she was eventually raised and placed in drydock in May 1918. However, in the chaos of the Russian Revolution and subsequent Civil War, no further repair work was done, and the ship was scrapped beginning in 1926. Her guns and their turrets, which had fallen out of the ship when she capsized, were later salvaged in 1931–1933. Two of the guns were used in the 30th Coast Defense Battery defending Sevastopol during World War II, also known as Maksim Gor'kii I by the Germans.

=== Imperatritsa Ekaterina Velikaya ===
Imperatritsa Ekaterina Velikaya (Russian: Императрица Екатерина Великая, "Empress Catherine the Great") was launched on 6 June 1914 and completed on 18 October 1915. She was originally named Ekaterina II until 27 June 1915 and was renamed Svobodnaya Rossiya (Russian: Free Russia) in 1917. She engaged the German battlecruiser SMS Goeben while the latter was in Turkish service as Yavuz Sultan Selim only once, but failed to inflict anything more severe than splinter damage. She also encountered Midilli on 16 April 1916, but the cruiser used her higher speed to escape. She was scuttled on 18 June 1918 in Novorossiysk to prevent her from being turned over to the Germans as required by the Treaty of Brest-Litovsk. No attempt was made to salvage her during the 1920s, but the 12-inch shells were salvaged from her wreck until a magazine explosion was triggered in 1930 by the explosive charges used to gain access to the shells.

=== Imperator Aleksander III ===
Imperator Aleksander III (Russian: Император Александр Третий, Emperor Alexander III) was launched on 2 April 1914, renamed Volya (Ukrainian: Воля—Freedom) in 1917 and then General Alekseyev (Russian: Генерал Алексеев) in 1920. The ship did not take part in operations during World War I due to long delays in the delivery of its machinery from Britain, but was able to go to sea by 1917 and conduct a series of trials. On 1 May 1918 she sailed from Sevastopol to Novorossiysk to avoid capture by advancing German troops. While at Novorossiysk she received an order to scuttle on 19 June 1918, but the majority of the crew refused to do so and decided to return to Sevastopol. Upon arrival she was disarmed and only guards were left on board, but the Germans took control on 1 October. She made a brief cruise with a German crew on 15 October, but her guns were still inoperable. After Germany's surrender she was turned over to the British, who moved her to İzmit in Turkey. In 1919 the British brought her back to the Black Sea and turned her over to the White Russian forces, where she fought in the Russian Civil War against the Red Army, mainly carrying out shore bombardments. With the collapse of the White Russian armies in Southern Russia in 1920, the battleship assisted in their evacuation to French-owned Tunisia, where she was interned in Bizerte. She was eventually scrapped there to pay her docking fees.

The French stored her guns and later donated them to the Finns during the Winter War, although they did not arrive until after the end of the war. The Germans captured four of these 12-inch and some 130 mm guns in transit in Narvik harbor when they invaded Norway in April 1940. Both the Finns and Germans used these guns as coastal artillery. The Germans emplaced all four guns, after rebuilding them to accept German ammunition, in armored turrets in 'Batterie Mirus' on Guernsey. The Finns used three of the 12-inch guns to repair railway guns that had fallen into their hands in 1941. They were used throughout the Continuation War and the Finns were forced in 1944 to surrender them to the Soviets who used them until the 1990s.

== See also ==
- Naval warfare of World War I#Black Sea

== Bibliography ==
- Budzbon, Przemysław (1985). "Russia". In Gray, Randal (ed.). Conway's All the World's Fighting Ships 1906–1921. Annapolis, Maryland: Naval Institute Press. pp. 291–325. ISBN 0-85177-245-5.
- Friedman, Norman (2008). Naval Firepower: Battleship Guns and Gunnery in the Dreadnought Era. Annapolis, Maryland: Naval Institute Press. ISBN 978-1-59114-555-4.
- Friedman, Norman (2011). Naval Weapons of World War One: Guns, Torpedoes, Mines and ASW Weapons of All Nations: An Illustrated Directory. Barnsley, UK: Seaforth. ISBN 978-1-84832-100-7.
- McLaughlin, Stephen (2003). Russian & Soviet Battleships. Annapolis, Maryland: Naval Institute Press. ISBN 1-55750-481-4.
- Vinogradov, Sergei E. (1998). "Battleship Development in Russia from 1905 to 1917". Warship International. XXXV (3): 267–290. ISSN 0043-0374.
- Vinogradov, Sergei E. (1999). "Battleship Development in Russia From 1905 to 1917, Chapter 2". Warship International. XXXVI (2): 118–141. ISSN 0043-0374.
