= Russian battleship Imperatritsa Ekaterina Velikaya =

Imperatritsa Mariya-class dreadnought

Coordinates: 44°42′23″N 37°48′43″E

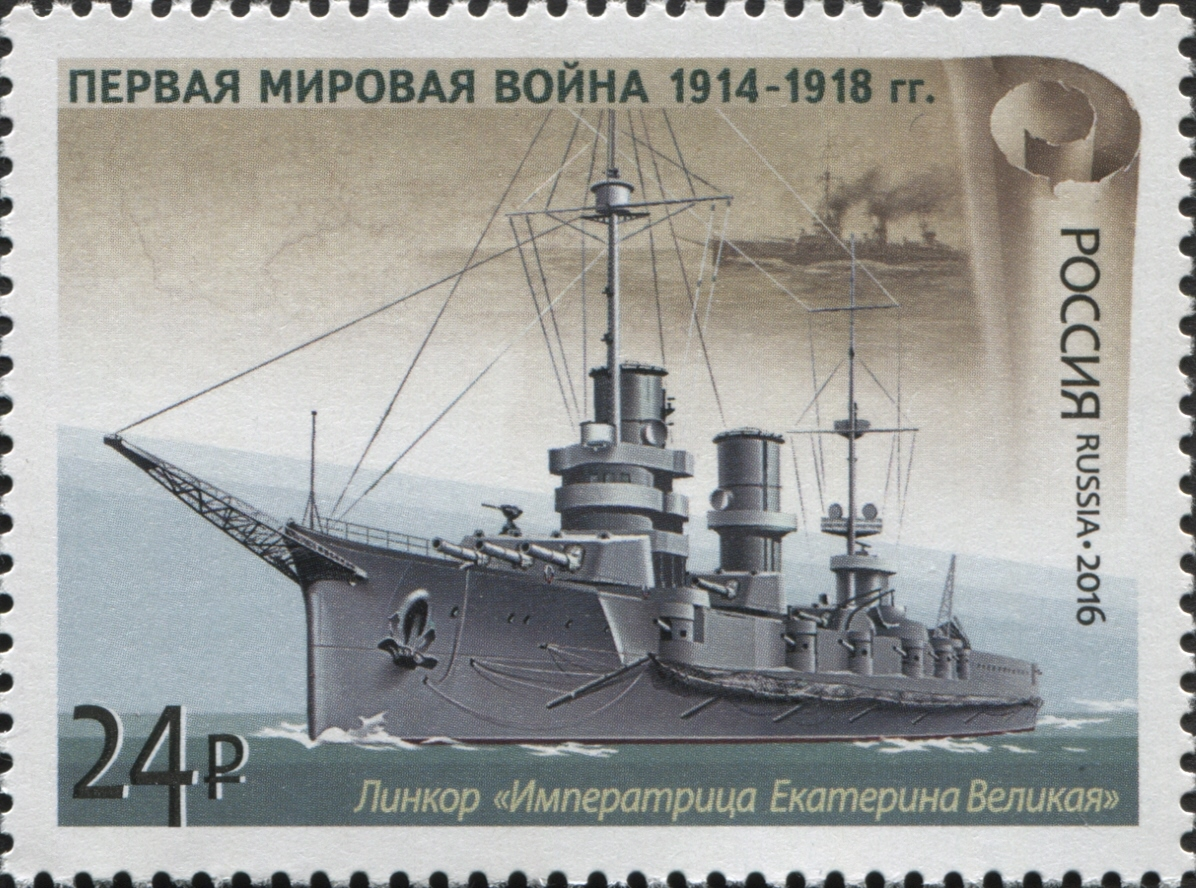
- A Russian stamp honoring Imperatritsa Ekaterina Velikaya

History

Russian Empire
- Name: Imperatritsa Ekaterina Velikaya (Императрица Екатерина Великая (Empress Catherine the Great))
- Namesake: Catherine the Great
- Operator: Imperial Russian Navy
- Builder: ONZiV Shipyard, Nikolayev
- Cost: 29,804,000 gold rubles
- Laid down: 30 October 1911 (Note: All dates used in this article are New Style, which is 13 days later after 1900)
- Launched: 6 June 1914
- Commissioned: 18 October 1915
- Renamed: Svobodnaya Rossiia (Свободная Россия (Free Russia)), 29 April 1917

Russian SFSR
- Name: Svobodnaya Rossiia
- Operator: Red Fleet
- Acquired: November 1917
- Fate: Scuttled, 18 June 1918

General characteristics
- Class & type: Imperatritsa Mariya-class battleship
- Displacement: 24,644 long tons (25,039 t)
- Length: 556 ft (169.5 m) (waterline)
- Beam: 92 ft (28 m)
- Draft: 28 ft 7 in (8.7 m)
- Installed power: 20 Yarrow boilers; 27,000 shp (20,000 kW)
- Propulsion: 4 shafts; 4 steam turbines
- Speed: 21 knots (39 km/h; 24 mph)
- Range: 1,680 nautical miles (3,110 km; 1,930 mi) at 21 knots (39 km/h; 24 mph)
- Complement: 1,154
- Armament: 4 × triple 12 in (305 mm) guns; 20 × single 130 mm (5.1 in) guns; 3 × single 75 mm (3 in) AA guns; 4 × single 17.7 in (450 mm) torpedo tubes
- Armor: Waterline belt: 4.9–10.3 in (125–262 mm); Deck: 1–2 in (25–50 mm); Turrets: 9.8 in (250 mm); Barbettes: 9.8 in (250 mm); Conning tower: 11.8 in (300 mm)

Imperatritsa Ekaterina Velikaya (Russian: Императрица Екатерина Великая (Empress Catherine the Great)) was the second of three Imperatritsa Mariya-class dreadnoughts built for the Imperial Russian Navy during World War I. Completed in 1915, she was assigned to the Black Sea Fleet. She engaged the ex-German battlecruiser Yavûz Sultân Selîm once, but only inflicted splinter damage while taking no damage herself. The ship briefly encountered an Ottoman light cruiser, but mostly covered the actions of smaller ships during the war without firing her guns. These included minelaying operations off the Bosporus and anti-shipping sweeps of the coast of Anatolia. Imperatritsa Ekaterina Velikaya was renamed Svobodnaya Rossiya (Russian: Свободная Россия, Free Russia) after the February Revolution of 1917.

She was evacuated from Sevastopol as German troops approached the city in May 1918, but was scuttled in Novorossiysk harbor the following month when the Germans demanded that the Soviets hand her over according to the terms of the Treaty of Brest-Litovsk. Svobodnaya Rossiya was only partially salvaged after the war.

== Description ==
Awarded the contract for one of the three Black Sea battleships authorized in 1911, the Associated Factories and Shipyards of Nikolayev (ONZiV) lacked an experienced design staff of its own, the company hired the British shipbuilder Vickers Limited to assist with the process of producing detailed drawings from the preliminary sketch design. Based on the historic tendency for Russian ships to be overweight, the Vickers consultants suggested that the ship's hull be enlarged to create a greater reserve of buoyancy and the Naval Ministry agreed despite the additional costs involved. Imperatritsa Ekaterina Velikaya was 556 feet (169.5 m) long at the waterline and had a beam of 92 feet (28 m); 4 feet 10 inches (1.47 m) longer and 2 feet (0.6 m) wider than her half-sisters. Her exact draft is not known, but she had a draft of 28 feet 7 inches (8.7 m) during her sea trials. The ship displaced 24,644 long tons (25,039 t) at normal load, over 900 long tons (910 t) more than her designed displacement of 23,783 long tons (24,165 t). The lead ship of the class, Imperatritsa Mariya, had proven to be very bow-heavy in service and tended to take large amounts of water through her forward casemates. The ammunition for Imperatritsa Ekaterina Velikaya's forward 12-inch (305 mm) guns was reduced from 100 to 70 rounds each while the ammunition for the forward 130-millimeter (5.1 in) guns was reduced from 245 to 100 rounds per gun in a successful attempt to compensate for her trim. This was successful because Imperatritsa Ekaterina Velikaya's longer length meant that she was less affected by the trim problem to begin with.

Imperatritsa Ekaterina Velikaya was fitted with four license-built Parsons steam turbine sets, each driving one shaft using steam provided by 20 triangular Yarrow boilers that burned either coal or fuel oil at a working pressure of 250 psi (1,724 kPa; 18 kgf/cm^{2}). Designed to produce 27,000 shaft horsepower (20,000 kW) which was intended to give the ship a speed was 21 knots (39 km/h; 24 mph), the turbines produced 33,000 shp (25,000 kW) on trials, although no figures for her speed have been found. The ship carried enough coal and fuel oil to give her a range of 1,680 nautical miles (3,110 km; 1,930 mi) at full speed and 3,000 nautical miles (5,600 km; 3,500 mi) at a more economical speed. All of her electrical power was generated by four primary Curtis 360-kilowatt (480 hp) turbo generators and two 200-kilowatt (270 hp) auxiliary units.

=== Armament and protection ===
Her main battery consisted of a dozen Obukhovskii 12-inch Pattern 1907 guns mounted in four triple turrets distributed over the length of the ship. Her secondary armament consisted of twenty 130 mm B7 Pattern 1913 guns positioned in hull-mounted casemates. They were arranged in two groups, six guns per side from the forward turret to the rear funnel and the remaining four clustered around the rear turret. Imperatritsa Ekaterina Velikaya was also fitted with three 75-millimeter (3 in) anti-aircraft guns, one mounted on the roof of the fore turret and two side by side on the aft turret. The ship was fitted with four 17.7-inch (450 mm) submerged torpedo tubes, two tubes on each broadside.

The waterline armor belt of the Imperatritsa Mariya class was 4.9–10.3 inches (124–262 mm) thick with the thickest portion covering the length of the ships between the 9.8-inch-thick (250 mm) barbettes. The armor of their gun turrets was also 9.8 inches thick and their decks ranged from 1 to 2 inches (25 to 51 mm) in thickness. The armor plates protecting the conning tower were 11.8 inches (300 mm) thick

== Service ==
Imperatritsa Ekaterina Velikaya was built by the ONZiV Shipyard at Mykolaiv. She was laid down on 30 October 1911 as Ekaterina II, but this was just a ceremonial event as neither the design had been finalized nor the contract signed. ONZiV decided, on advice from Vickers, to increase her dimensions over those of her sisters to prevent her from being overweight. This added over two million gold rubles to her cost and delayed the start of her construction three months past her half-sisters. She was launched on 6 June 1914, renamed on 27 June 1915, and completed on 18 October. She ran her trials over the remainder of the year.

She was nearly sunk by the Russian destroyer Bystry on 5 January 1916 when the destroyer fired seven torpedoes at her in a case of mistaken identity; luckily they all missed. Three days later she encountered the Yavûz Sultân Selîm at long range. The battlecruiser was in pursuit of the Russian destroyers Pronzitelny and Leytenant Shestakov after they had sunk the 4,400-gross register ton (GRT) collier SS Carmen earlier that morning. The destroyers had alerted Imperatritsa Ekaterina Velikaya which had increased her speed in an attempt to intercept the faster Ottoman ship. The ships opened fire at about 22,000 yards (20,000 m) and Yavûz Sultân Selîm fired five salvoes without damaging the Russian battleship before she disengaged from the slower ship. Imperatritsa Ekaterina Velikaya fired 96 shells from her longer-ranged guns, but inflicted only splinter damage on Yavûz Sultân Selîm before she pulled out of range. Imperatritsa Ekaterina Velikaya was escorting three seaplane carriers to attack Varna, Bulgaria, on 9 March when the operation was cancelled after a destroyer reconnoitering the harbor struck a mine and sank. At the end of the month, she helped to cover the movement of 36 transports from Odessa to Novorossiysk in preparation for an amphibious landing the next month. The battleship may have briefly engaged the light cruiser Midilli on 4 April, firing at the smaller ship for about 15 minutes with little effect before she was able to disengage. Other sources, however, state that the Ottoman ship actually encountered Imperatritsa Mariya. (Note: Halpern was citing Pavlovich, but the situation is even more confusing as Langensiepen & Güleryüz claim that the engagement between Imperatritsa Mariya and Midilli actually happened on 19 April.)

Three months later Imperatritsa Ekaterina Velikaya and her half-sister Imperatritsa Mariya, alerted by intercepted radio transmissions, sortied from Sevastopol in an attempt to intercept Yavuz and Midilli as they returned from a bombardment of the Russian port of Tuapse on 4 July. The Ottoman ships dodged north and avoided the Russians by paralleling the Bulgarian coastline back to the Bosporus. Imperatritsa Ekaterina Velikaya escorted another seaplane carrier attack on Varna harbor on 25 August; German aircraft counterattacked and damaged one of the escorting destroyers. On 11 October 1916, she ran aground off Sevastopol. She was refloated and taken in to Sevastopol for repairs.

=== 1917–1918 ===
Together with three pre-dreadnought battleships and the protected cruiser Pamiat Merkuria, the battleship patrolled off the northwestern coast of Anatolia on 5–9 January 1917, helping to sink 39 sailing cargo ships. Escorted by three destroyers and Pamiat Merkuria, Imperatritsa Ekaterina Velikaya cruised off the Anatolian coast on 23–25 February and her escorts sank 3 sailing ships. After the February Revolution she was renamed Svobodnaya Rossiya (Свободная Россия, "Free Russia") on 29 April. She was part of the covering force for minelaying operations off the mouth of the Bosporus on 17–24 May. While covering another such operation a month later, the ship briefly engaged Midilli on 25 June as the cruiser was returning from a minelaying sortie off the mouths of the Danube River. Svobodnaya Rossiya was only able to fire nine salvos from her forward turret without effect before the much faster Midilli was able to disengage. On 24 August Svobodnaya Rossiya helped to screen a raid on the harbor of the Anatolian city of Ordu. The ship was ordered to intercept Midilli on 1 November, but the crew refused to participate and returned to Sevastopol. The navy ceased offensive operations against the Central Powers in early November in response to the Bolshevik Decree on Peace before a formal Armistice was signed the next month.

The ship sailed from Sevastopol to Novorossiysk on 30 April 1918 as German troops approached the city. Svobodnaya Rossiya was scuttled on 19 June by four torpedoes fired by the destroyer Kerch in Novorossiysk harbor to prevent her from being turned over to the Germans as required by the Treaty of Brest-Litovsk. The fourth torpedo caused a massive explosion and she capsized and sank in four minutes. No attempt was made to salvage her during the 1920s, but the 12-inch shells were salvaged from her wreck. Explosive charges were used to gain access to her magazines until one day in 1930 when a charge set off a torpedo warhead, which caused a nearby powder magazine to explode, throwing a column of water 100–120 meters (110–130 yd) into the air. No one was injured, but work of this type ceased, although parts of her engines and boilers were later salvaged.

== Bibliography ==
- Breyer, Siegfried (1992). Soviet Warship Development. Vol. I: 1917–1937. London: Conway Maritime Press. ISBN 0-85177-604-3.
- Budzbon, Przemysław (1985). "Russia". In Gray, Randal (ed.). Conway's All the World's Fighting Ships 1906–1921. Annapolis, Maryland: Naval Institute Press. pp. 291–325. ISBN 0-85177-245-5.
- Greger, René (1972). The Russian Fleet 1914–1917. Shepperton, UK: Ian Allan. ISBN 0-7110-0255-X.
- Halpern, Paul G. (1995). A Naval History of World War I. Annapolis, Maryland: Naval Institute Press. ISBN 1-55750-352-4.
- Langensiepen, Bernd & Güleryüz, Ahmet (1995). The Ottoman Steam Navy 1828–1923. London: Conway Maritime Press. ISBN 0-85177-610-8.
- McLaughlin, Stephen (2003). Russian & Soviet Battleships. Annapolis, Maryland: Naval Institute Press. ISBN 1-55750-481-4.
- Nekrasov, George (1992). North of Gallipoli: The Black Sea Fleet at War 1914–1917. East European monographs. Vol. CCCXLIII. Boulder, Colorado: East European Monographs. ISBN 0-88033-240-9.
- Pavlovich, N. B. (1979). The Fleet in the First World War. New Delhi: Published for the Smithsonian Institution and the National Science Foundation, Washington, D.C., by Amerind Pub. Co. OCLC 6627675.
