= Superfiring =

Arrangement of gun turrets on a warship with one higher and behind the other

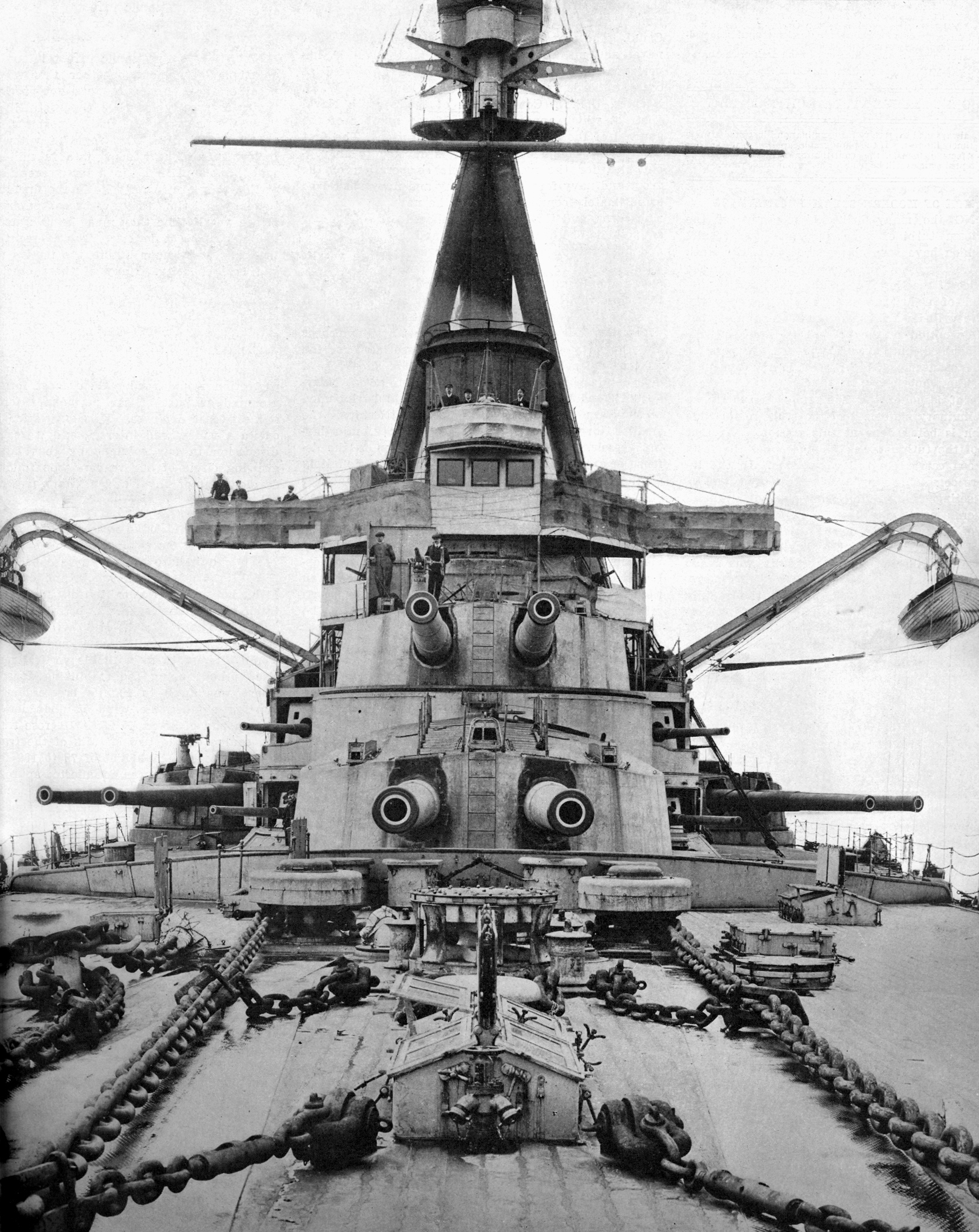
The two bow gun turrets on one of the first superfiring battleships, the Brazilian Minas Geraes. They are "superfiring" because one has been mounted over the other, and can shoot over its top.

Superfiring armament is a naval design technique in which two or more turrets are located one behind the other, with the rear turret located above ("super") the one in front so that it can fire over the first. This configuration meant that both forward and aft turrets could fire at any target within their sector, even when the target was directly ahead of the turrets.

== History ==
Historically, large surface warships were known by the generic label of battleships, with a further distinction between pre-dreadnoughts and dreadnoughts. The era of technical evolution occurred roughly from 1900 to 1945. Part of the technical evolution was driven by the need to compress as much large-gun firepower into the smallest space possible. In early designs, the large-caliber turrets were all located on the same plane firing to one side or the other. In firing ahead or to the rear, usually only the forward-most or rearmost turret could fire, especially at low angles.

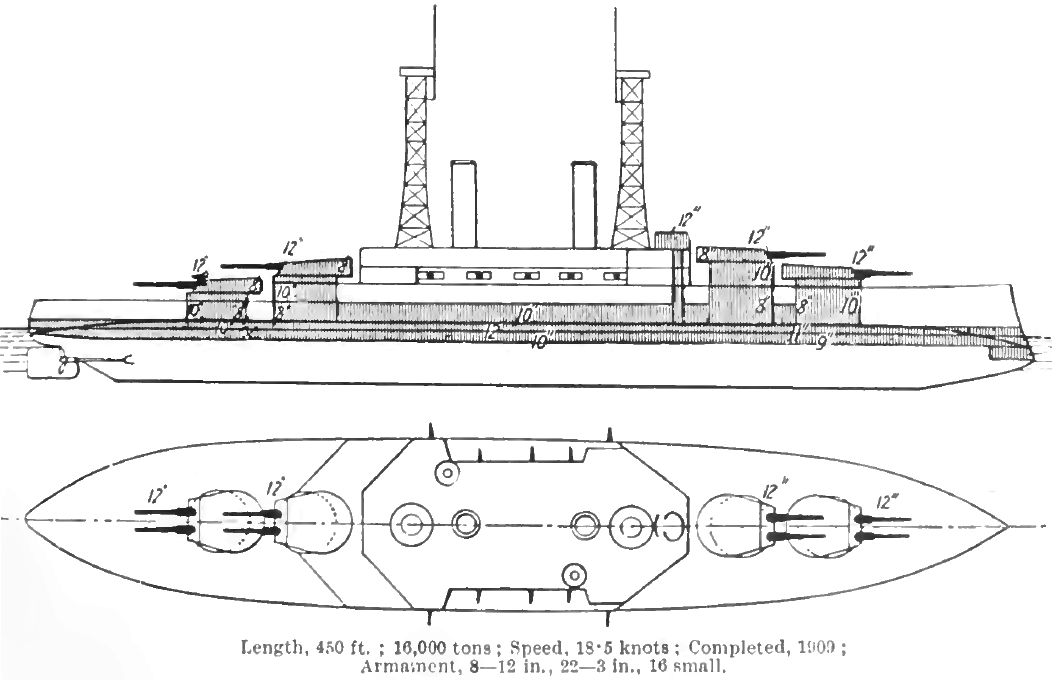
Line drawing of a South Carolina-class battleship, showing superfiring main armament. (Note: Reprinted from Brassey's Naval Annual, 1912.)

An early concern was that the pressure and shock from the higher turret would damage the lower one when firing over the top. In 1908, United States Navy tests using the monitor USS Florida (BM-9) as the testbed proved that superfiring was safe. The result was the design for the first South Carolina-class battleship (commissioned in 1910).

The first ship with superfiring artillery (though not of the same caliber), was the French battleship Henri IV, launched in 1899.

Superfiring was not limited to two turrets. For example, the Atlanta class of light cruisers, which were developed and built for service in World War II, utilized a triple-overlap system both forward and astern, their armament of dual-mount 5"/38 caliber dual-purpose main armament having a nearly unobstructed arc of fire. The British Dido class, which were also light cruisers armed entirely with dual-purpose guns (the 5.25" Mk 1), also had three turrets forward, with two aft.

== Advantages and disadvantages ==
Advantages of superfiring turrets over non-superfiring arrangements include improved firing arcs for all except the foremost and rearmost turrets, as well as an increase of useful deck space on which to build the ship's superstructure due to the concentration of the main batteries towards the ends of the ship. Depending on the design of the ship and its weapons, it may also help to avoid problems with the ship's propulsion.

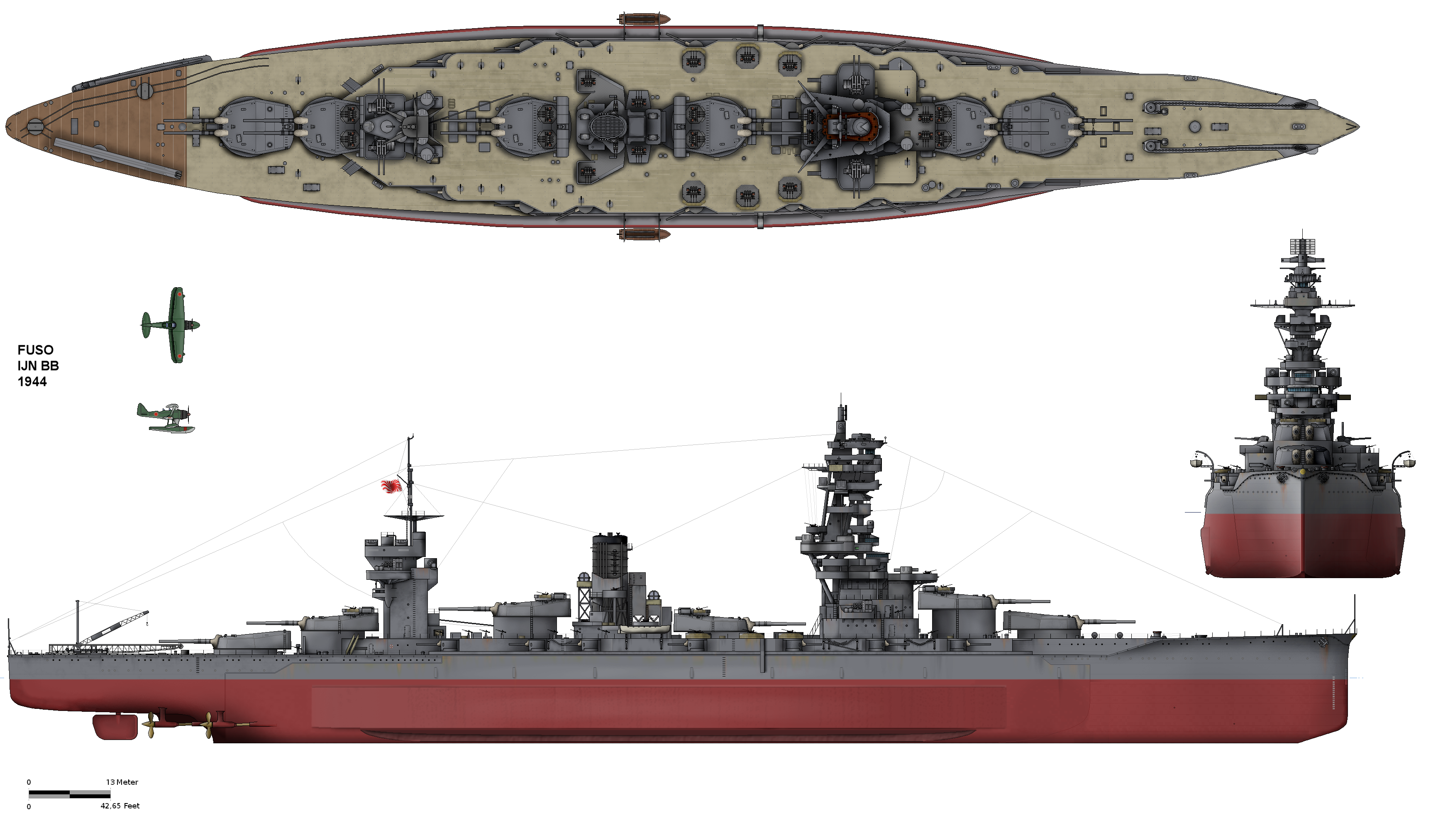
The Japanese battleship Fuso featured a combination of superfiring and non-superfiring turrets. The placement of the Z-turret (third from the stern) interfered with the steam turbines, requiring it to be raised above the deck.

The disadvantage of this arrangement is a higher center of mass as a result of the higher placement of turrets, thus decreasing the metacentric height. The resulting decrease in stability may need to be corrected by compromises elsewhere to keep the center of mass low.

Because of this, superfiring arrangements, while common, are not used exclusively. Examples of non-superfiring designs include but are not limited to the Gangut, Imperatritsa Mariya, and Imperator Nikolai I classes of battleships built for the Imperial Russian navy, as well as modern ships such as the Zumwalt-class destroyers. In addition, many ships, such as the New York-class battleships, used combinations of superfiring and non-superfiring arrangements. Exclusively non-superfiring arrangements also remained common on destroyers.
