= Russian battleship Imperatritsa Mariya =

Imperatritsa Mariya-class dreadnought

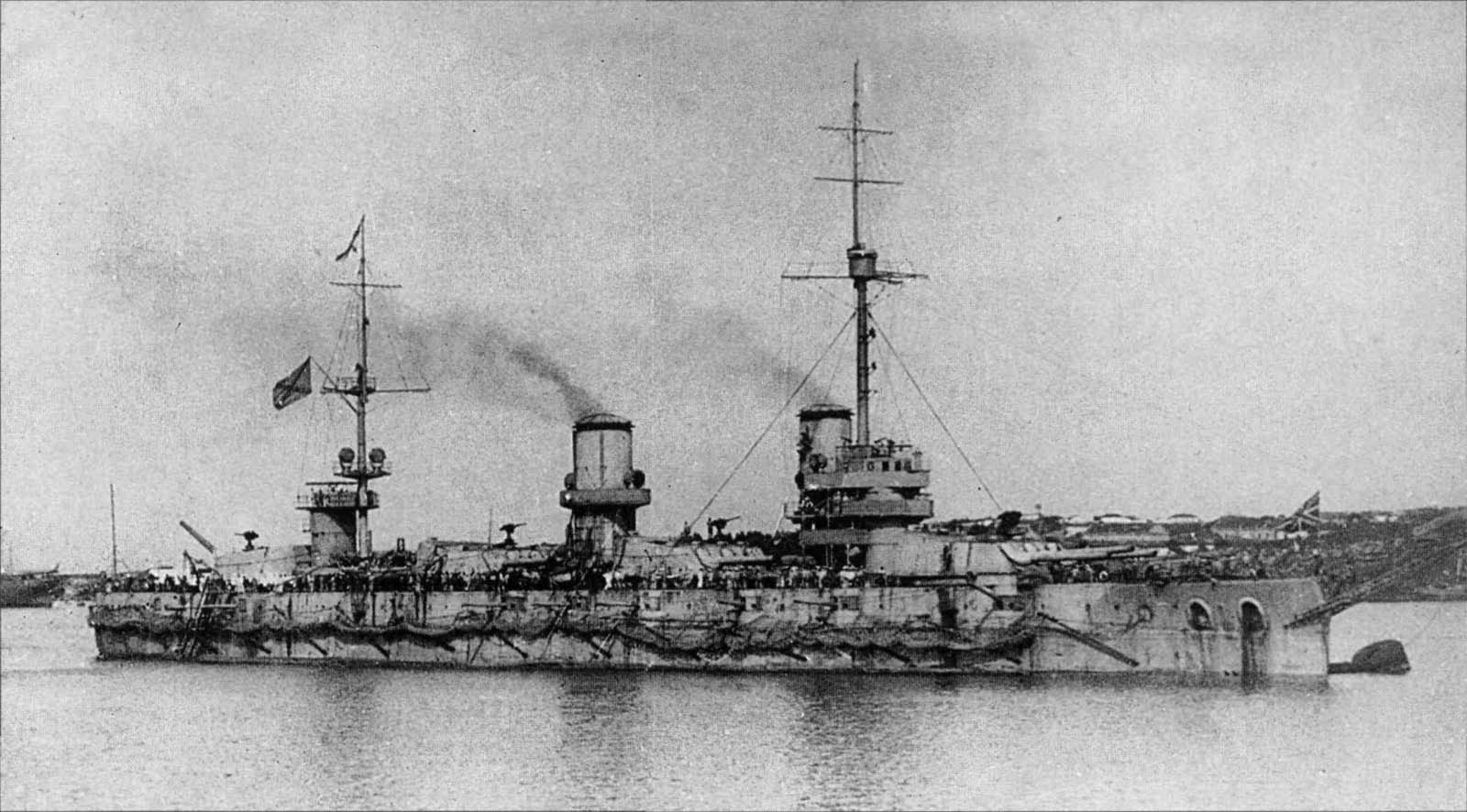
- Imperatritsa Mariya at anchor in Sevastopol

History

Imperial Russian Navy
- Name: Imperatritsa Mariya
- Namesake: Maria Feodorovna
- Operator: Imperial Russian Navy
- Builder: Russud Shipyard, Nikolayev
- Laid down: 30 October 1911 (Note: All dates used in this article are New Style)
- Launched: 19 October 1913
- In service: 10 June 1915
- Out of service: Sunk by internal explosion, 20 October 1916
- Stricken: 21 November 1925
- Fate: Scrapped beginning 1926

General characteristics
- Class & type: Imperatritsa Mariya-class battleship
- Displacement: 23,413 long tons (23,789 t)
- Length: 168 m (551 ft 2 in)
- Beam: 27.43 m (90 ft 0 in)
- Draft: 8.36 m (27 ft 5 in)
- Installed power: 26,000 shp (19,000 kW); 20 Yarrow boilers
- Propulsion: 4 × Shafts; 4 × Parsons steam turbines
- Speed: 21 knots (39 km/h; 24 mph)
- Range: 1,640 nmi (3,040 km; 1,890 mi) at 21 knots (39 km/h; 24 mph)
- Complement: 1,213
- Armament: 4 × triple 12 in (305 mm) guns; 20 × single 130 mm (5.1 in) guns; 4 × single 75 mm (3 in) AA guns; 2 × twin 17.7 in (450 mm) submerged torpedo tubes
- Armor: Waterline belt: 125–262.5 mm (4.92–10.33 in); Deck: 9–50 mm (0.35–1.97 in); Turrets: 250 mm (9.8 in); Barbettes: 250 mm (9.8 in); Conning tower: 300 mm (11.8 in)

Imperatritsa Mariya (Russian: Императрица Мария: Empress Maria) was the lead ship of her class of three dreadnoughts built for the Imperial Russian Navy during World War I. She served with the Black Sea Fleet during the war and covered older pre-dreadnought battleships as they bombarded Ottoman facilities in 1915. The ship engaged the Ottoman light cruiser Midilli,(formerly the German SMS Breslau) several times without inflicting anything more serious than splinter damage. Imperatritsa Mariya was sunk at anchor in Sevastopol by a magazine explosion in late 1916, killing 228 crewmen. She was subsequently raised, but her condition was very poor. She was finally scrapped in 1926, after the end of the Russian Civil War.

== Description ==
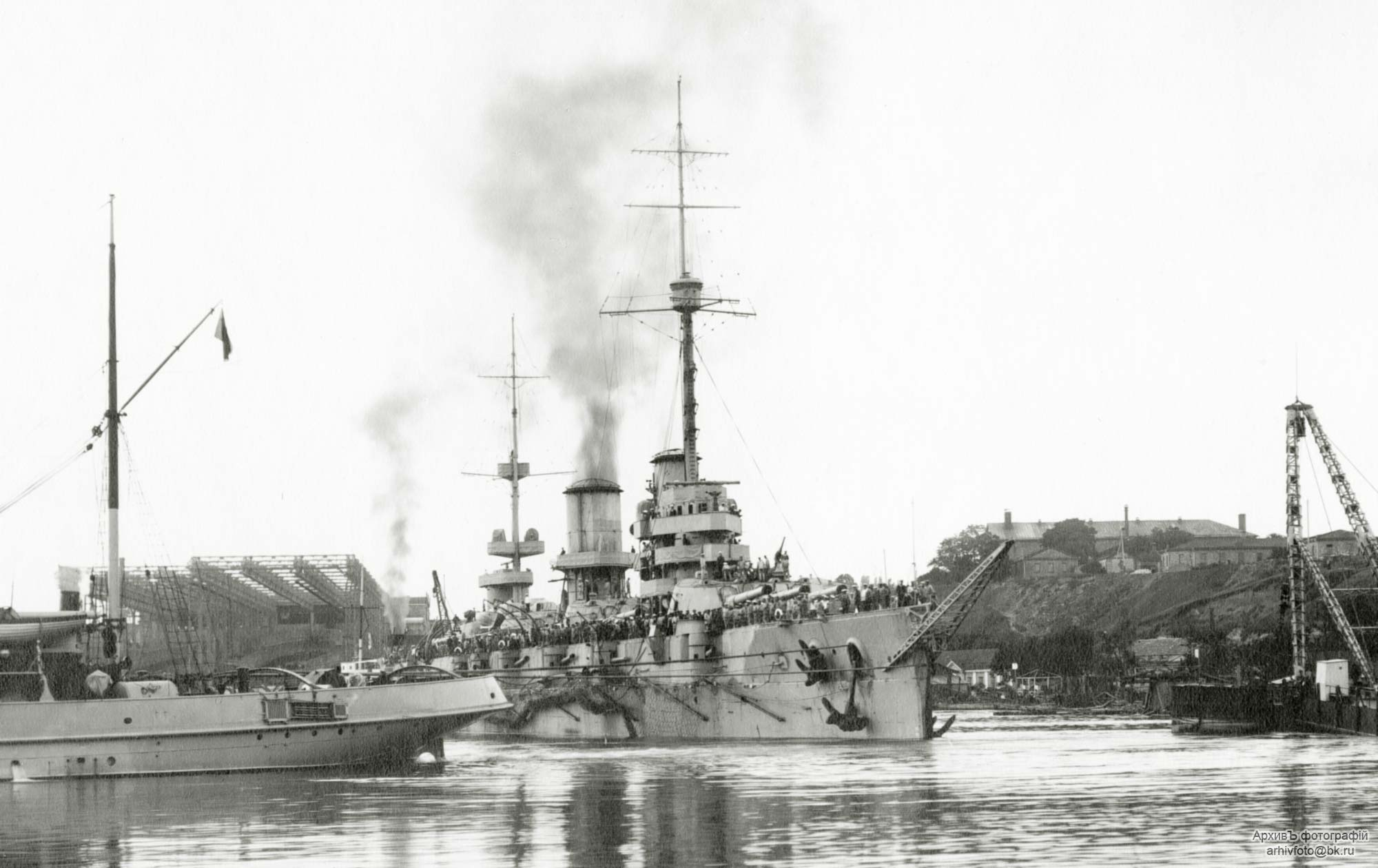
Imperatritsa Mariya at anchor on 24 June 1915; the structure on her bow is a mooring boom, not a bowsprit

Imperatritsa Mariya was 168 meters (551 ft 2 in) long at the waterline. She had a beam of 27.43 meters (90 ft 0 in) and a draft of 8.36 meters (27 ft 5 in). Her displacement was 23,600 long tons (23,979 t) at load, 1,000 long tons (1,016 t) more than her designed displacement of 22,600 long tons (22,963 t). She proved to be very bow-heavy in service and tended to ship large amounts of water through her forward casemates. The ammunition for the forward 12-inch (305 mm) guns was reduced from 100 to 70 rounds each, while the 130-millimeter (5.1 in) ammunition was reduced from 245 to 100 rounds per gun, in an attempt to compensate for her trim. This did not fully cure the problem, but Imperatritsa Mariya was lost before any other changes could be implemented.

The ship was fitted with four Parsons-type steam turbines imported from John Brown & Company of the United Kingdom. They were designed for a total of 26,000 shaft horsepower (19,000 kW), but produced 33,200 shp (24,757 kW) on her sea trials using steam produced by 20 mixed-firing triangular Yarrow boilers with a working pressure of 17.5 atm (1,770 kPa; 260 psi). Designed speed was 21 knots (39 km/h; 24 mph). Her maximum coal capacity was 1,700 long tons (1,727 t) plus 500 long tons (510 t) of fuel oil, which gave her a range of 1,640 nautical miles (3,040 km; 1,890 mi) at maximum speed. All of her electrical power was generated by three Curtis 360-kilowatt (480 hp) main turbo generators and two 200-kilowatt (270 hp) auxiliary units.

Her main armament consisted of a dozen 12-inch Obukhovskii Pattern 1907 guns mounted in four triple gun turrets distributed the length of the ship. Her secondary armament consisted of twenty 130 mm B7 Pattern 1913 guns mounted in casemates. They were arranged in two groups, six guns per side from the forward turret to the rear funnel and the remaining four were clustered around the rear turret. She was fitted with four 75-millimeter (3 in) anti-aircraft guns, one mounted on the roof of each turret. Four 17.7-inch (450 mm) submerged torpedo tubes were carried, two tubes on each broadside abaft the forward magazine.

== Service ==
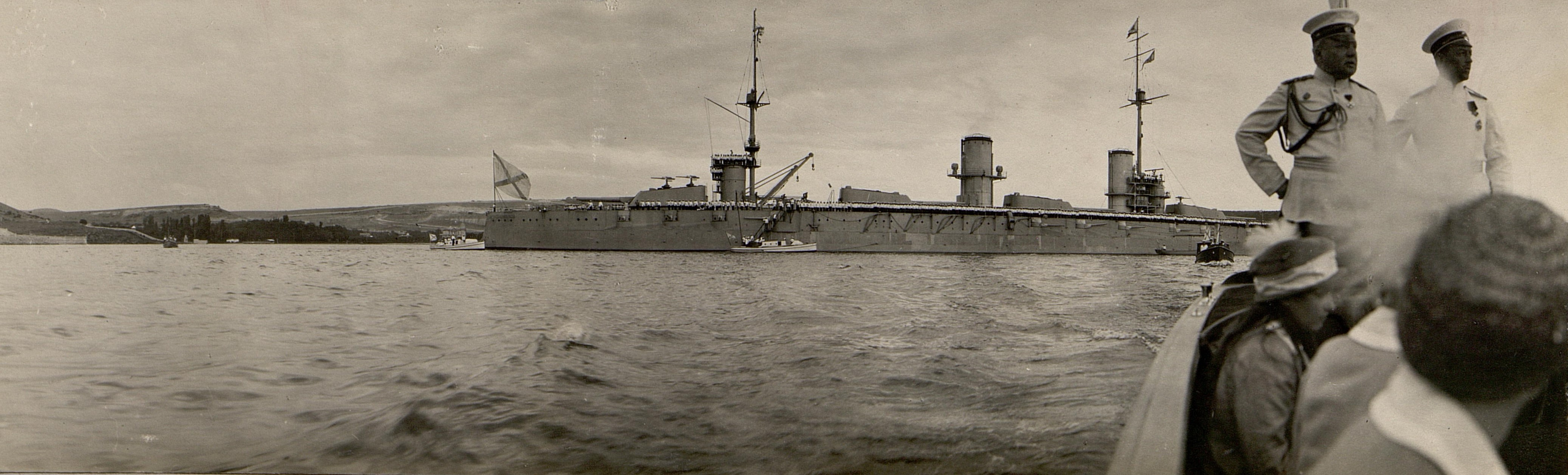
A panoramic photo of the battleship Imperatritsa Mariya, while being inspected by the Romanov imperial family in the port of Sevastopol (27 May 1916). The grand duchess Anastasia is clearly visible on the right.

Imperatritsa Mariya, named after Tsarina Maria Feodorovna, mother of Tsar Nicholas II, was built by the Russud Shipyard at Nikolayev, Russian Empire. She was laid down on 30 October 1911 along with her sister ships Imperator Aleksander III and Imperatritsa Ekaterina Velikaya, but this was merely a ceremonial event as the design had not yet been finalized nor the contract signed. She was launched on 19 October 1913 and arrived in Sevastopol on 13 July 1915, where she completed her fitting out during the next few months and conducted sea trials. On 1 October she provided cover for the Black Sea Fleet's pre-dreadnoughts as they bombarded targets in Kozlu, Zonguldak and Karadeniz Ereğli. She did much the same when older battleships bombarded targets in Bulgaria on 20–22 October and then Varna itself on 27 October. The light cruiser Midilli narrowly escaped a running engagement with the Imperatritsa Mariya on 4 April 1916 as the battleship narrowly missed her several times before she could disengage. Three months later both Imperatritsa Mariya and Imperatritsa Ekaterina Velikaya, alerted by intercepted radio transmissions, sortied from Sevastopol in an attempt to intercept the ex-German battlecruiser Yavuz as she returned from a bombardment of the Russian port of Tuapse on 4 July. The Yavuz dodged north and avoided the Russians by paralleling the Bulgarian coastline back to the Bosphorus. The Midilli mined the harbor of Novorossiysk on 21 July, but the Russians, again alerted by radio intercepts, attempted to catch her on her return journey. Midilli was lured into range of Imperatritsa Mariya's guns the next day when the cruiser pursued the Russian destroyer Schastlivy, but she managed to escape with only splinter damage.

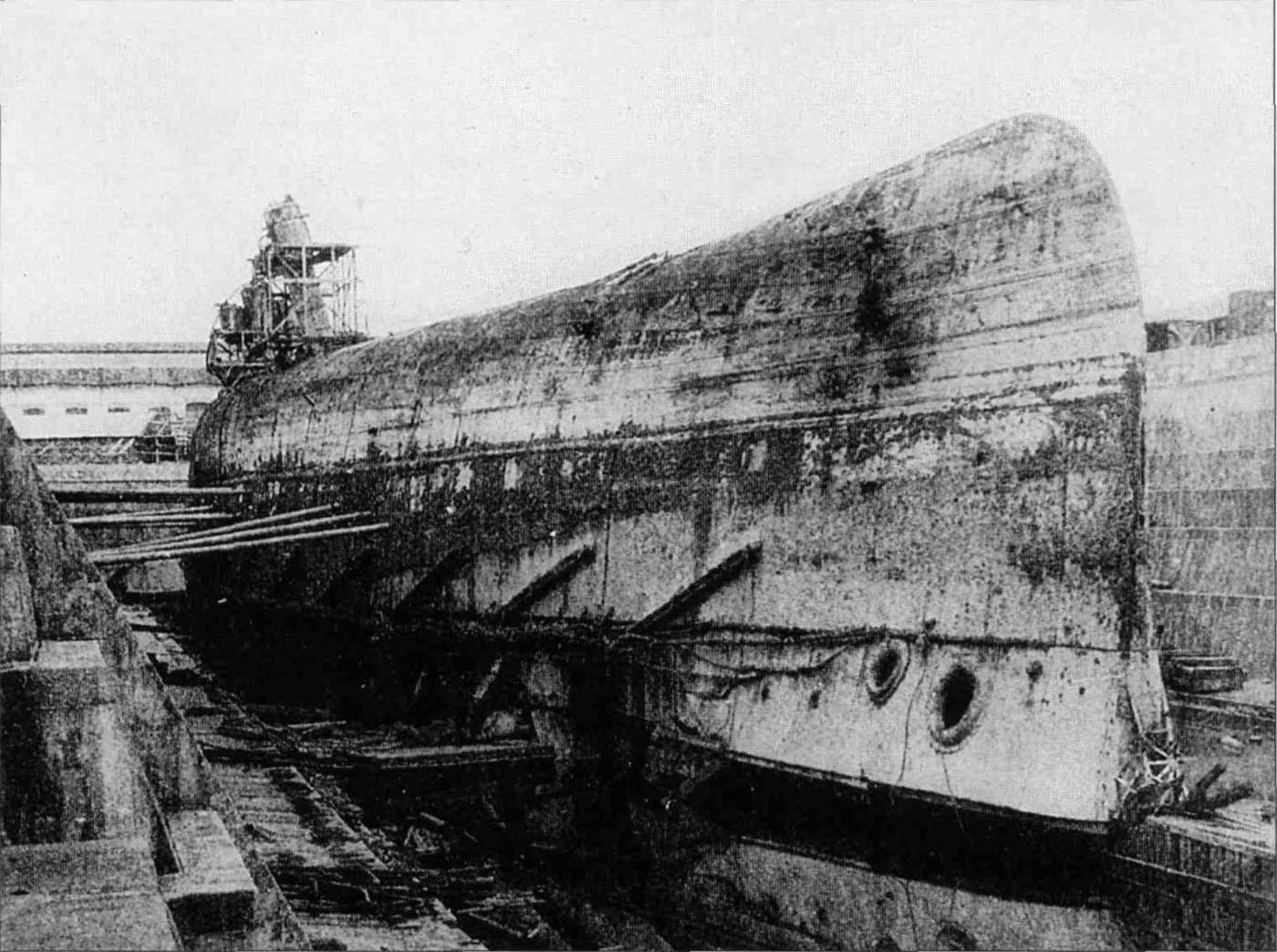
Hull of the Imperatritsa Mariya in 1919 after salvage

On the morning of 20 October 1916, a fire was discovered in the Imperatritsa Mariya's forward powder magazine while at anchor in Sevastopol, but it exploded before any efforts could be made to fight the fire. Sailors led by Engineer-Mechanic Midshipman Ignatyev, however, managed to flood the forward shell magazine before the explosion at the cost of their own lives. Their action probably prevented a catastrophic detonation and all of the other magazines were flooded as a precaution. About forty minutes after the first explosion, a second occurred in the vicinity of the torpedo compartment that destroyed the watertight integrity of the rest of the forward bulkheads. Imperatritsa Mariya began to sink by the bow and listed to starboard. She capsized a few minutes later, taking 228 sailors with her. The subsequent investigation determined that the explosion was probably the result of spontaneous combustion of the nitrocellulose-based propellant as it decomposed.

Following a complex salvage operation, the ship was eventually refloated on 18 May 1918 and moved into Sevastopol's Northern Dry Dock on 31 May, still upside down. The chaos of the Russian Revolution and Civil War prevented further repair work, although her 130 mm guns were removed. By 1923, the wooden blocks supporting her in place were rotting. She was floated out and grounded in shallow water in 1923. She was approved for scrapping in June 1925 and officially stricken on 21 November 1925, although the work did not begin until 1926 when she was refloated and moved back into the dry dock. Her gun turrets, which had fallen out of the ship when she capsized, were later salvaged. Two of them were used as the 30th Coast Defense Battery defending the city during the Siege of Sevastopol in World War II.

== Bibliography ==
- Brown, David K. & McCallum, Iain (2001). "Ammunition Explosions in World War I". Warship International. XXXVIII (1): 58–69. ISSN 0043-0374.
- Budzbon, Przemysław (1985). "Russia". In Gray, Randal (ed.). Conway's All the World's Fighting Ships 1906–1921. Annapolis, Maryland: Naval Institute Press. pp. 291–325. ISBN 0-85177-245-5.
- McLaughlin, Stephen (2003). Russian & Soviet Battleships. Annapolis, Maryland: Naval Institute Press. ISBN 1-55750-481-4.
- Silverstone, Paul H. (1984). Directory of the World's Capital Ships. New York: Hippocrene Books. ISBN 0-88254-979-0.
