= Maxim Gorky Fortresses =

WW2 Soviet coastal batteries in the Crimea

Armoured Coastal Batteries No.30 and No.35
- Part of Soviet Union
- Crimea

Site information
- Type: Coastal defence and fortifications
- Controlled by: Soviet Union
- Condition: Restored, mothballed (Maxim Gorky I); Damaged, museum (Maxim Gorky II)

Site history
- Built: 1912–1929
- In use: 1929–1997 (Maxim Gorky I); 1929–1943 (Maxim Gorky II)
- Battles/wars: World War II
- Events: Crimean Campaign; Siege of Sevastopol

Garrison information
- Past commanders: Georgy Aleksandrovich Alexander (Maxim Gorky I) (1941–1942); Alexei Yakovlevich Leshchenko (Maxim Gorky II) (1940–1942)
- Occupants: Black Sea Fleet, Red Army

Armoured Coastal Batteries #30 and #35, commonly known in English as Maxim Gorky I and Maxim Gorky II, were coastal batteries used by the Soviet Union during the Crimean Campaign of World War II. The invading German forces nicknamed them after the famous Soviet author and political activist Maxim Gorky.

== Maxim Gorky I ==
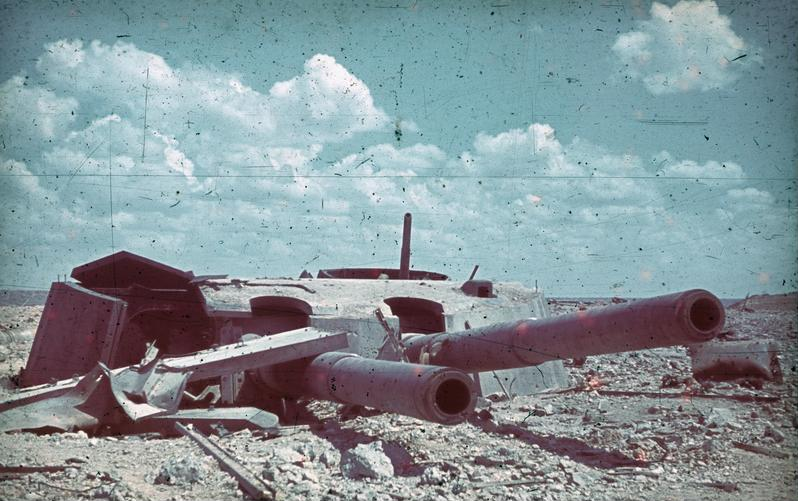
Destroyed gun turret of fort Maxim Gorky I

Maxim Gorky I (Russian: Бронебашенная батарея-30, lit. 'Armoured Turret Battery-30') was located east of Ljabimorka, at 44.664°N 33.559°E (north of Severnaya Bay which formed Sevastopol's harbor), and contained two twin gun turrets which could fire four 30.5 cm guns. Once the Germans had broken through the Perekop Isthmus in October 1941, they advanced on Sevastopol but were confronted by Maxim Gorky I. They deployed the 80 cm rail gun Schwerer Gustav to destroy it. On June 6, 1942, heavy guns and Karl-Gerät siege mortars managed to make direct hits on the battery which destroyed one of the gun turrets and damaged the other. None of these were successful in eliminating the Maxim Gorky I, however, and it was not until June 17 that it was put out of action by German assault engineers. According to the Soviets, the batteries guns ran out of ammunition, firing was forced to cease, and the fortification was subsequently blown up by the crew.

== Maxim Gorky II ==
Maxim Gorky II (Russian: Бронебашенная батарея-35, lit. 'Armoured Turret Battery-35'), which was armed with similar battleship turrets to Maxim Gorky I, was located on seaward cliffs on the southwest side of Sevastopol (44.559°N 33.407°E. On July 4, Maxim Gorky II was taken after the Sapun positions were captured, making it the last major pre-war fortification to take part in a campaign.

== Post-War ==
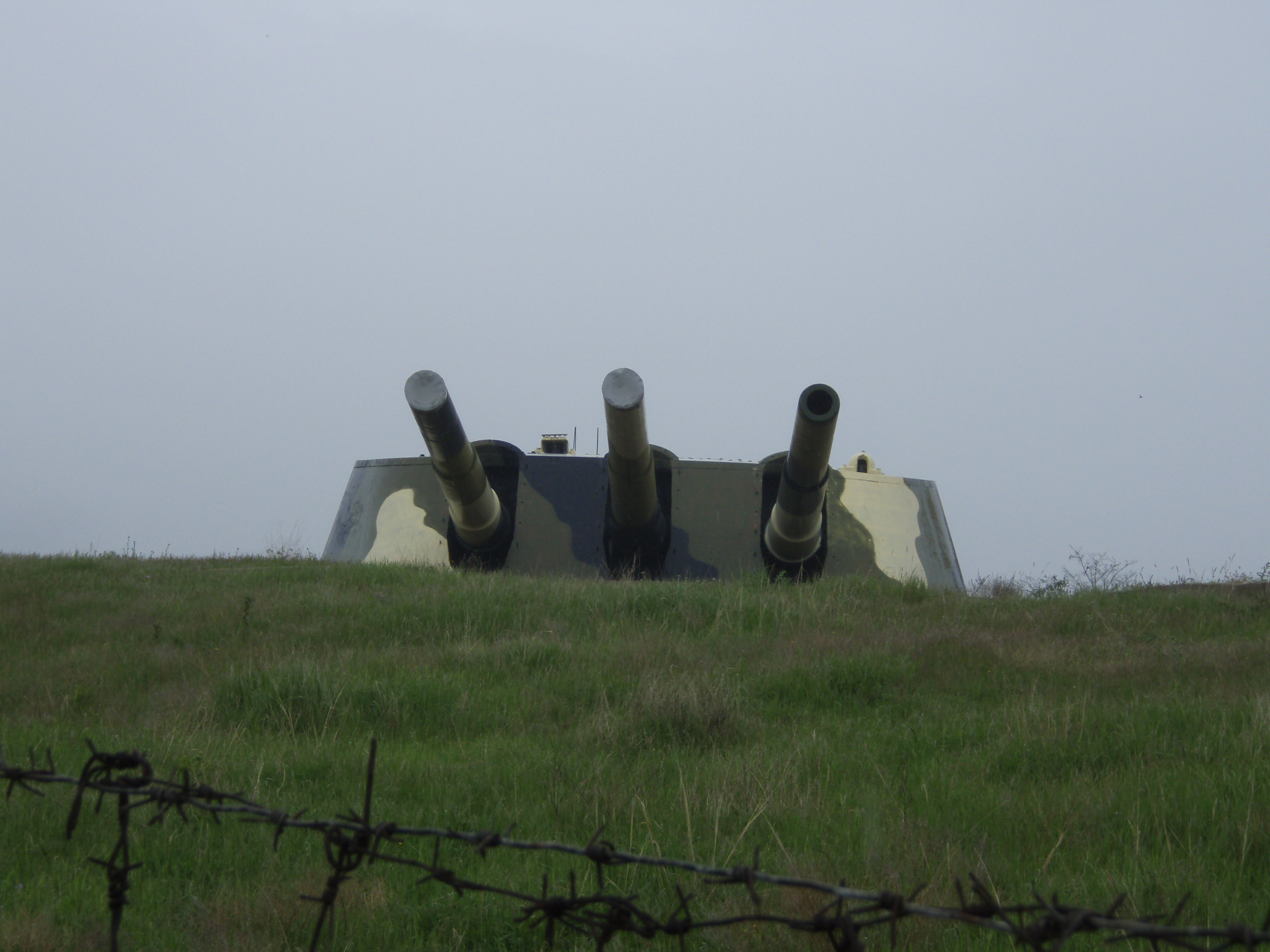
Maxim Gorky I Today

After the war, Maxim Gorky I was restored using the triple 305 mm gun turrets of the battleship Frunze, up-gunning it from 4 guns to 6, and upgraded with increased armour and a modern fire-control system. It remained in service until 1997 when it was mothballed, and the last time it fired its guns was in 1968, for the filming of the Soviet film "Sea on Fire" (Russian: Море в огне). It reportedly can be reactivated in only 72 hours.

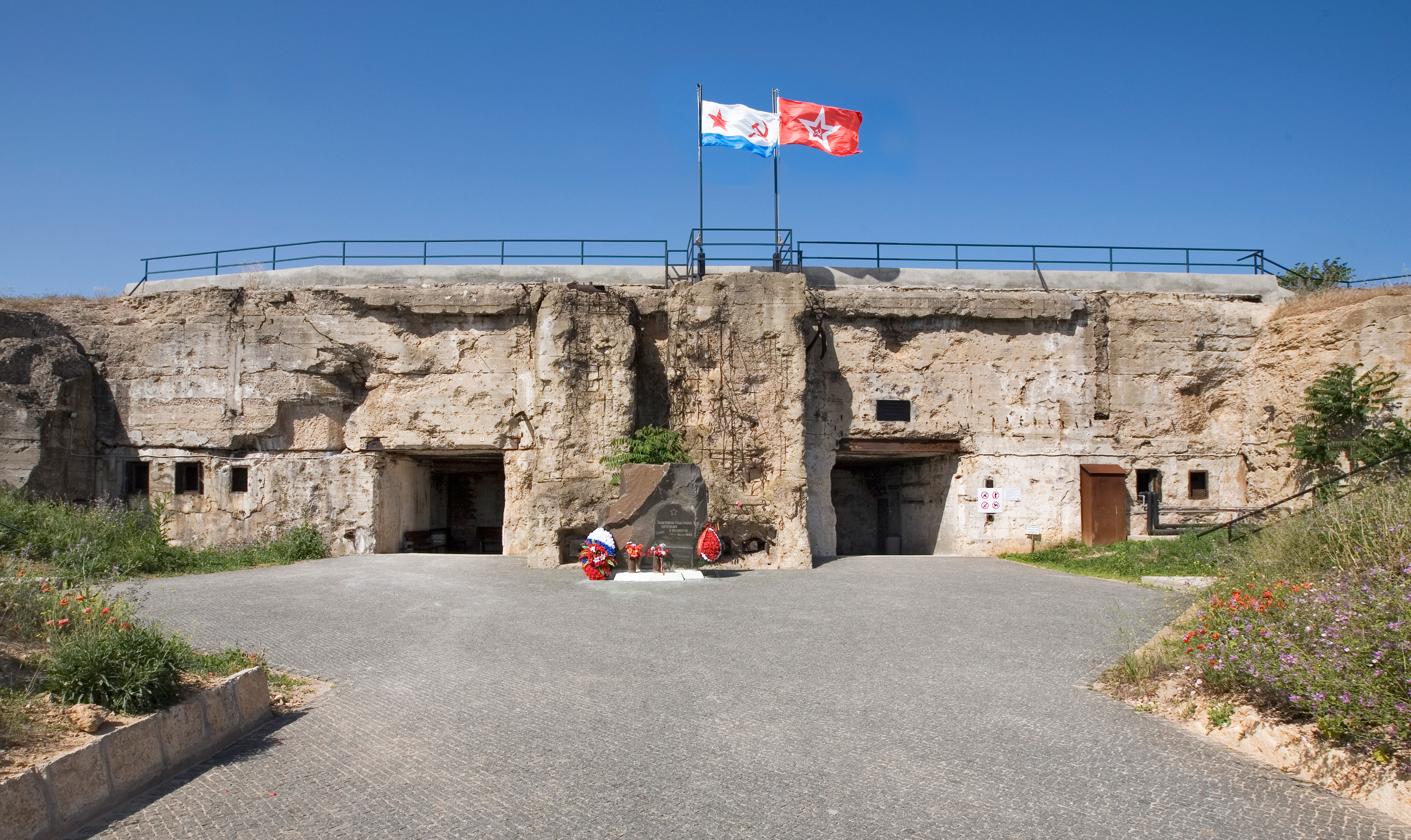
Entrance to fort Maxim Gorky II

Maxim Gorky II was not fully restored, with parts of the fort being used for other coastal batteries until 1963, when the military officially abandoned the fort. It was further damaged in the 1980s and 1990s by salvagers and grave robbers. In 2007, it was made into a museum complex commemorating the sacrifice of its defenders. Funding was acquired via charity, primarily from Russian businessman Aleksei Chaly.
