= Obukhovskii 12-inch/52-caliber Pattern 1907 gun =

Obukhovskii 12"/52 Pattern 1907 gun
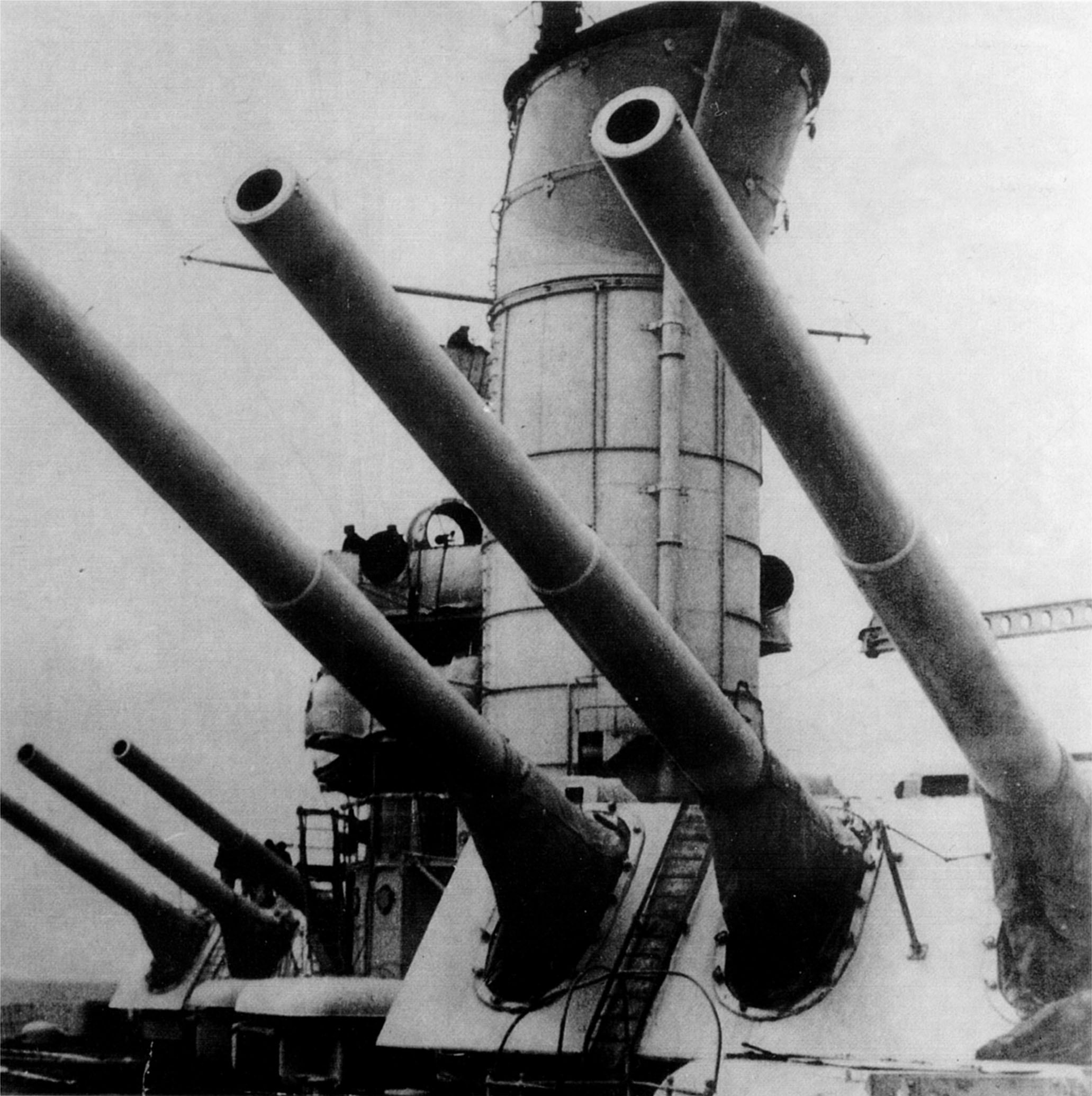
- "MK-3-12" turrets aboard the Soviet battleship Parizhskaya Kommuna (formerly and later Sevastopol), 1925
- Type: Naval gun Coastal artillery Railway gun
- Place of origin: Russian Empire

Service history
- In service: 1914–1999
- Used by: Russian Empire; Soviet Union; Finland; Estonia; Nazi Germany
- Wars: World War I Russian Civil War; World War II

Production history
- Designer: Obukhov State Plant
- Designed: 1907
- Manufacturer: Leningradsky Metallichesky Zavod
- Produced: 1910
- No. built: Between 126-144

Specifications
- Mass: 51 t (56 short tons)
- Length: 15.8 m (52 ft)
- Barrel length: 14.4 m (47 ft)
- Shell: Average: 444 kg (979 lb)
- Caliber: 12 inches (305 mm) 52 caliber
- Breech: Welin breech block
- Elevation: Original: -5° to +25°
- Rate of fire: 1-2 rounds per minute
- Muzzle velocity: Average: 815 m/s (2,670 ft/s)
- Maximum firing range: Average: 31 km (19 mi)

The Obukhovskii 12"/52 Pattern 1907 gun was a 12-inch (305 mm), 52-caliber naval gun. It was the most powerful gun to be mounted aboard battleships of the Imperial Russian Navy and later the Soviet Navy during both world wars. It was later modified by the Soviets and employed as coastal artillery and as a railway gun during World War II.

== History ==
The Obukhovskii 12"/52 Pattern 1907 was designed to reflect lessons learned from the Russo-Japanese War and despite changes in specifications while the guns were being manufactured they were considered excellent pieces. In April 1906 a conference of twenty admirals and specialists in ship and ordnance design met to determine what the specifications of the new fleet being built to replace the losses suffered during the Russo-Japanese War would be. The consensus of the meeting was that the new battleships would be armed with no less than twelve 12in guns mounted on the ships centerline and capable of delivering a twelve gun broadside. This would be superior to any foreign ships then in service or under construction. Four triple turrets were chosen for the new guns, because six double turrets would have made the ships too long for existing slipways. Design sketches in early 1907 showed that triple turrets would save 15 per cent in weight over double turrets. These triple gun turrets were designated "MK-3-12", and were deployed aboard the Gangut-class and Imperatritsa Mariya-class and installed on the Imperator Nikolai I (although her propulsion was never installed and she was never completed) dreadnoughts in mountings constructed by the Metallicheskii Works.

The gun originally envisioned was 12in/50 caliber, weighing 47.3 t (52.1 short tons), with a 331 kg (730 lb) shell, at a muzzle velocity of 914 m/s (3,000 ft/s). These new guns were to be based on the 12in/40 Pattern 1895 guns as used on the Andrei Pervozvanny-class battleships. Since the requirement for new battleships was so urgent, work began before range testing could determine the appropriate shell weight, muzzle velocity or chamber pressure for the new guns. In July 1906 the Obukhovskii Works began production on the now 12in/52 caliber guns, with the inner tubes of the first guns being completed by the end of 1906. Between the project approval in 1906 and the final approval of ordnance specifications in 1911 the weight of shell, muzzle velocity and chamber pressure had changed multiple times. Since the inner tubes had already been built it was impossible to lengthen the guns to suit the new specifications. After the specified changes were implemented a 471 kg (1,038 lb) shell with a muzzle velocity of 762 m/s (2,500 ft/s) and a weight of 51 t (56 short tons) was settled upon (muzzle velocity being traded for increased shell weight). The Naval Ministry ordered 198 guns and somewhere between 126-144 had been produced by the end of 1916. Another twelve of the forty two scheduled were delivered in 1917. Fourteen incomplete guns were finished in 1921 and a few others were later completed.

== Construction ==
The Obukhovskii 12"/52 Pattern 1907 was constructed of A tube, two B tubes to the muzzle, two C tubes, two D tubes and jacket. The breech bush screwed into the jacket, locking the parts together, and a collar was shrunk on the breech bush and the end of the collar covered by a small ring with a shoulder. Both collar and ring were placed in position when hot. A Welin breech block was used. Allowable barrel life for pieces mounted aboard Black Sea Fleet units was 400 rounds per gun. Russian doctrine was to re-line the barrels after 300 firings. Replacing the barrels in Maxim Gorky I was supposed to require a 75ton crane and take 60 days, under battlefield conditions working only at night with less equipment they were replaced in 16 days.

== General characteristics ==
- Barrel length: 52 calibers
- Maximum laying speed: vertical - 4 degrees per second, horizontal - 3.2 degrees per second (1.5 rounds/min @11 degrees elevation, 1 round/min @48 degrees elevation)
- Shell weight:
  - Naval 1911 : 471 kg (1,038 lb)
  - Coastal defense : 446 kg (984 lb)
  - German coastal : HE 250 or 405 kg, AP 405 kg (893 lb)
- Initial velocity of the shell:
  - Naval 1911 471 kg shell : 762 meters/second (2,500 feet/second)
  - Coastal defense 446 kg shell : 853 meters/second (2,800 feet/second)
  - Battery Mirus 250 kg shell : 1020 meters/second, 405 kg shell : 825 meters/second
- Range:
  - With 471 kg shell : 29,340 meters (32,080 yards)

Batterie Mirus' mountings enabled an elevation of 48degrees and maximum ranges of 51km (250kg shell) and 32km (405kg shell). These were reduced to 38/28km after 2 guns broke their trunnions and one gun damaged its recoil mechanism firing 250kg shells @31 degrees with 71kg of cordite propellant- the German propellant was too powerful.

== Coastal artillery ==
In addition to being deployed aboard the Gangut-class and Imperatritsa Mariya-class battleships, the guns were also emplaced as coastal artillery in the Peter the Great Naval Fortress along the Tallinn-Porkkala defensive line in 1917, as well as being mounted as railway guns.

Between the wars, Soviet forces placed four four-gun batteries around the Baltic Sea, two four-gun batteries in Sevastopol and two six-gun batteries in Vladivostok. Some guns from the Imperator Aleksandr III were later captured by the Germans in World War II and used in the Batterie Mirus in Guernsey during the German occupation of the Channel Islands. During the Second World War, the Soviet Separate Coastal Army maintained four of the guns in the Maxim Gorky Fortresses in Crimea. When an advancing German Army laid siege to Sevastopol, the coastal batteries were used extensively in the defense of the city. Both batteries were eventually knocked out of action.

== 305 mm railway gun M1938 (TM-3-12) ==
Three railway guns were built, using guns from the sunken battleship Imperatritsa Mariya, which had been lost to a magazine explosion in Sevastopol harbor in October 1916. They were used in the Soviet-Finnish war in 1939-1940. In June–December 1941 they took part in the defense of the Soviet naval base on Finland's Hanko Peninsula (Rus. Gangut/ Гангут). They were disabled by Soviet seamen when the base was evacuated, and were later restored by Finnish specialists using guns from the withdrawn Russian battleship Imperator Aleksandr III. After the war these were handed over to the Soviet Union, which were maintained in operational condition until 1991. Withdrawn from service in 1999, they were the last Obukhov pieces still operational in the world.

== Weapons of comparable role, performance and era ==
- BL 12 inch Mk XI - XII naval gun Vickers British equivalent
- 30.5 cm SK L/50 gun German equivalent

== Photo gallery ==
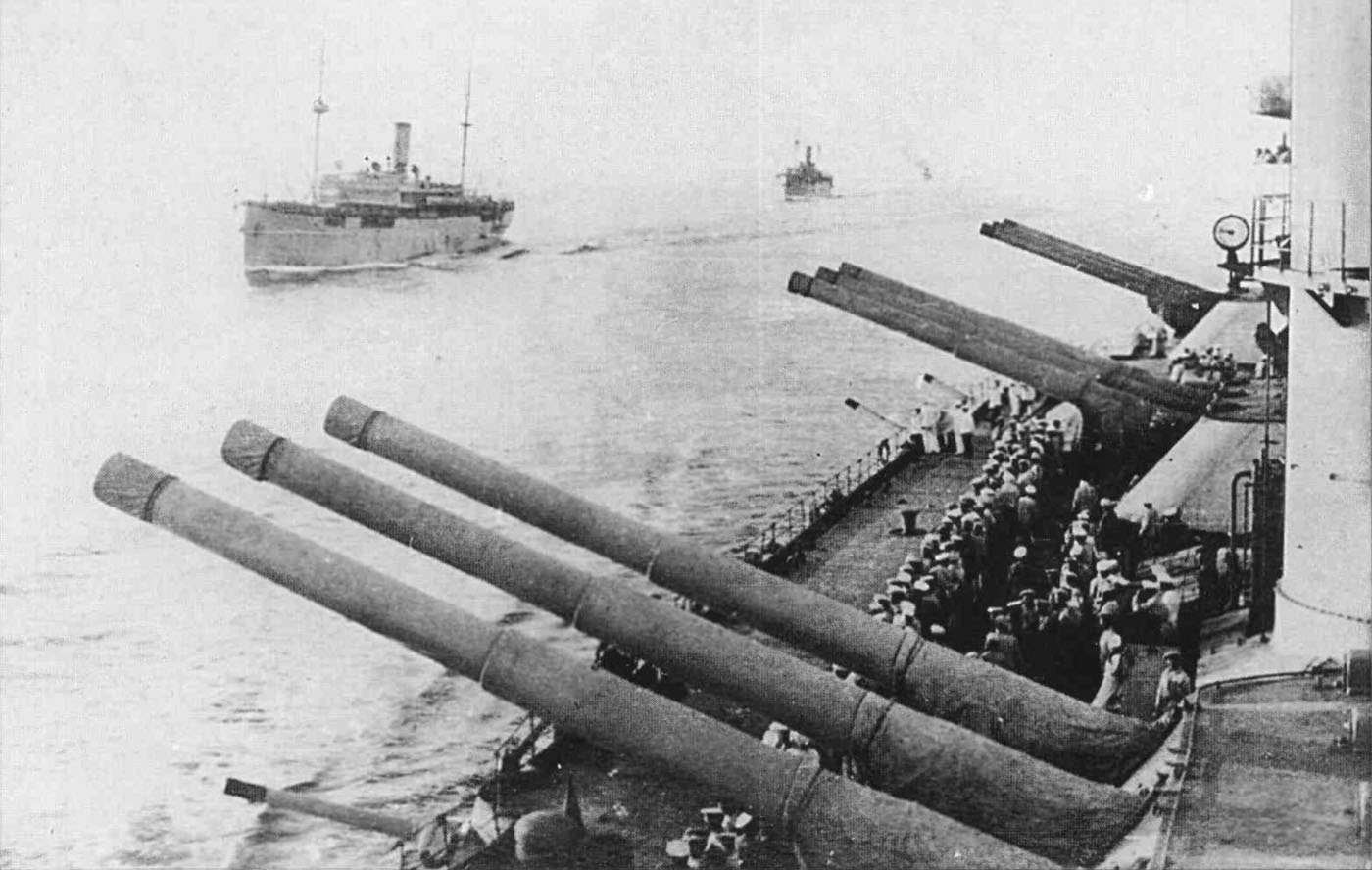
Triple gun turrets aboard Imperatritsa Ekaterina Velikaya

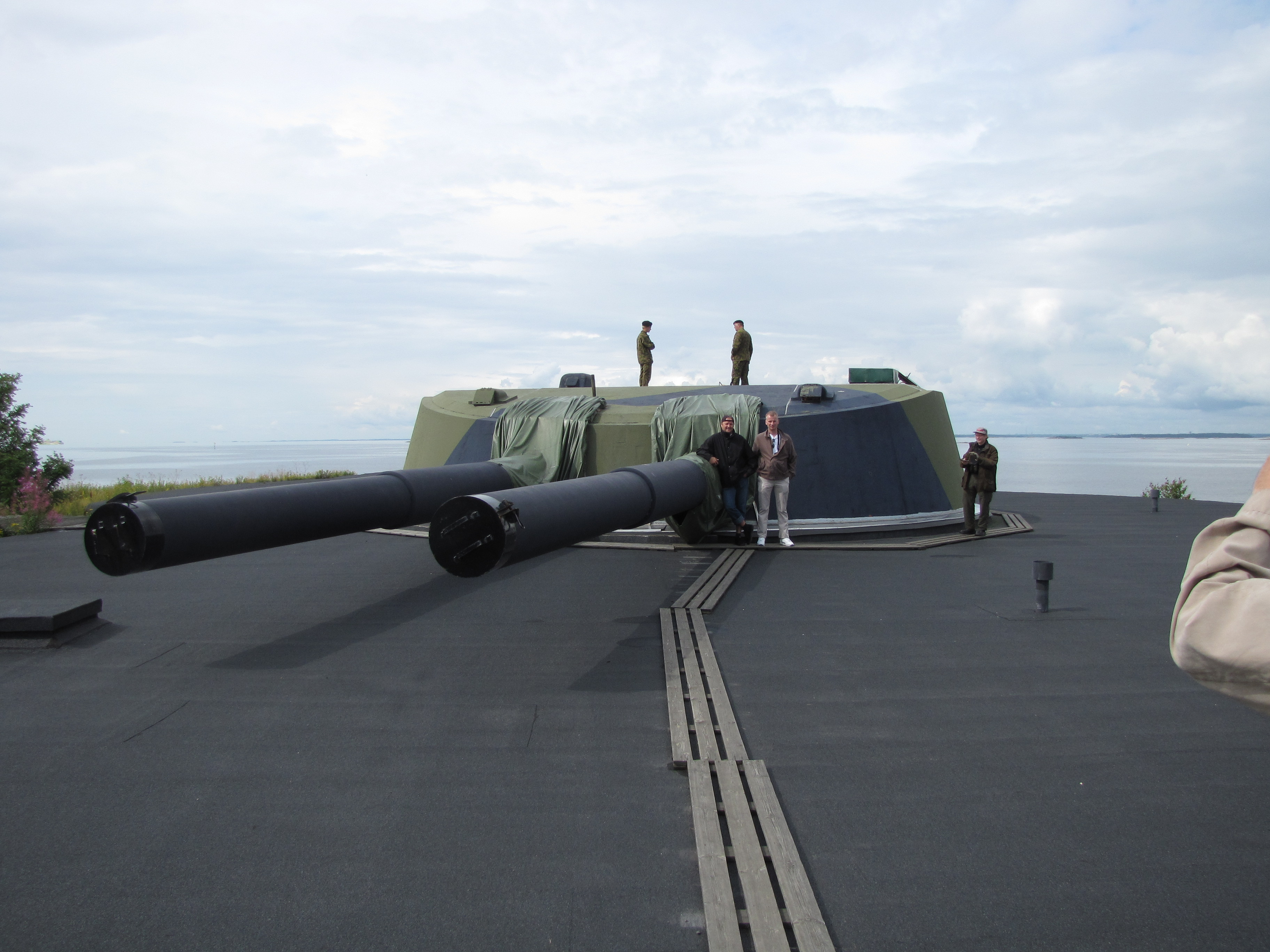
Coastal defense turret at Kuivasaari, Finland

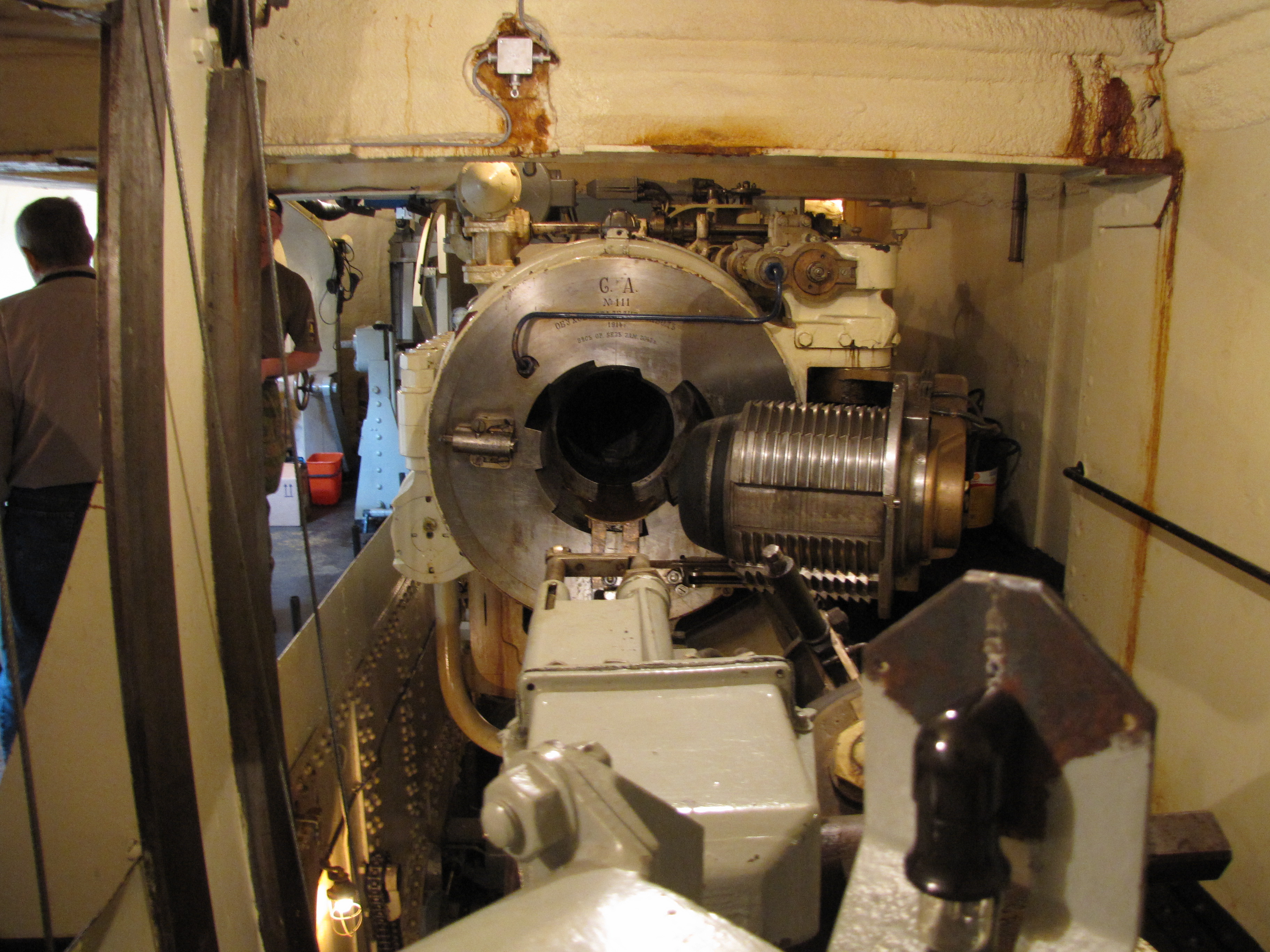
Turret interior at Kuivasaari. Note the Welin breech block

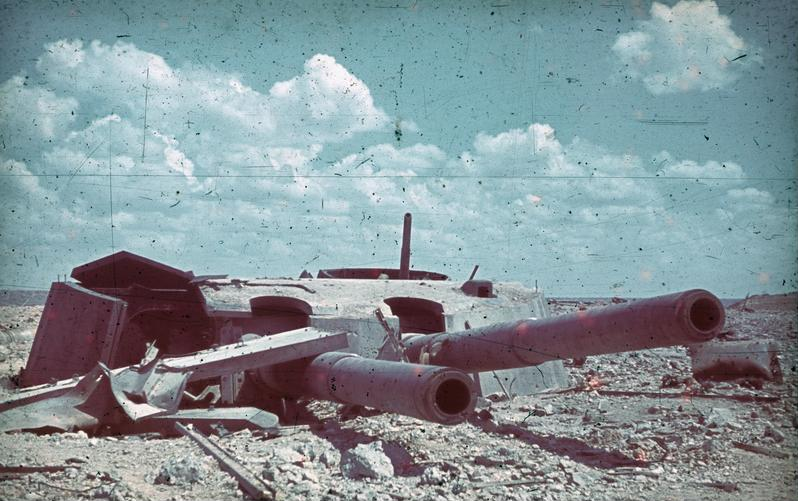
One of two Maxim Gorki batteries destroyed during the Siege of Sevastopol

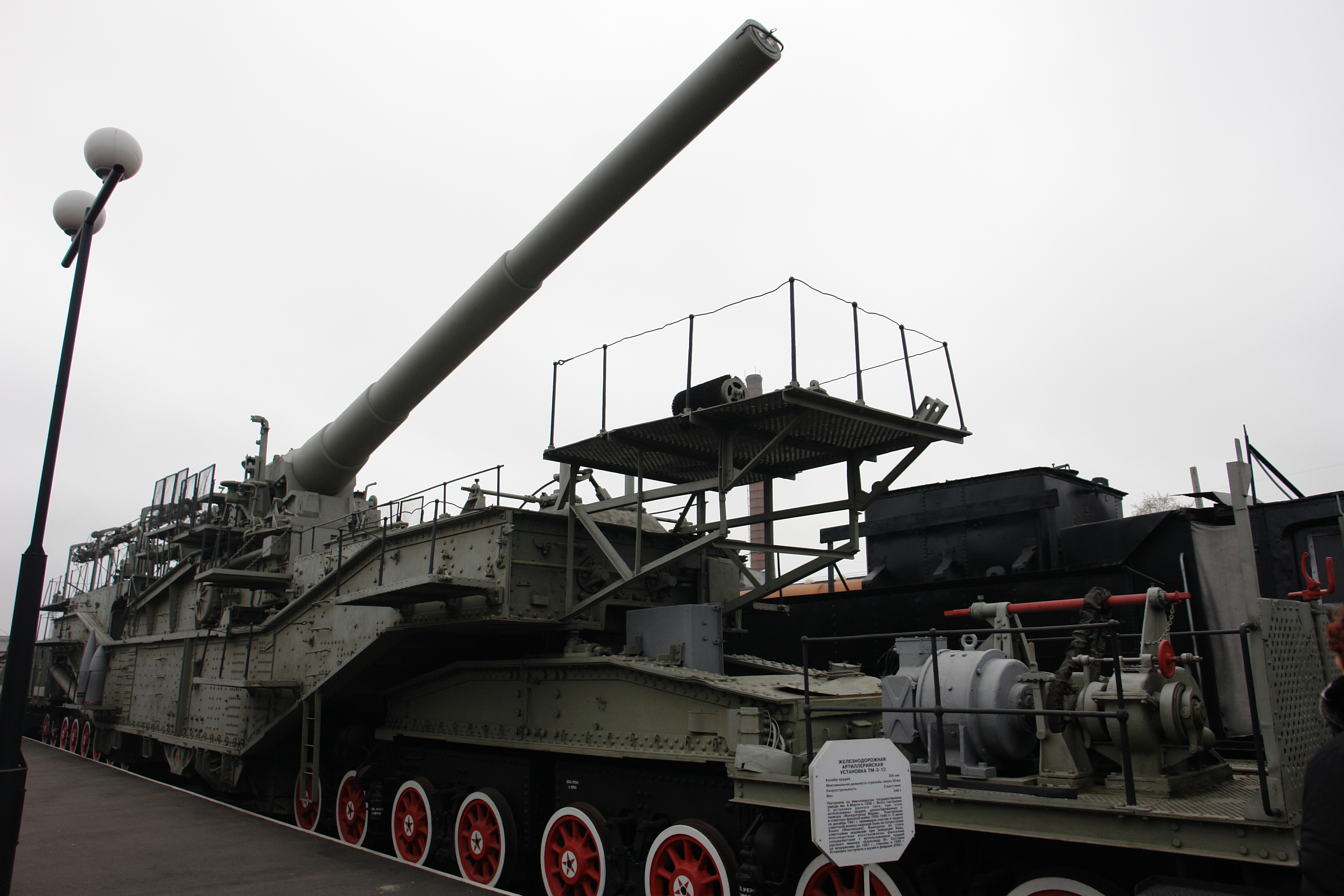
TM-3-12 at Varshavsky Rail Terminal, St.Petersburg

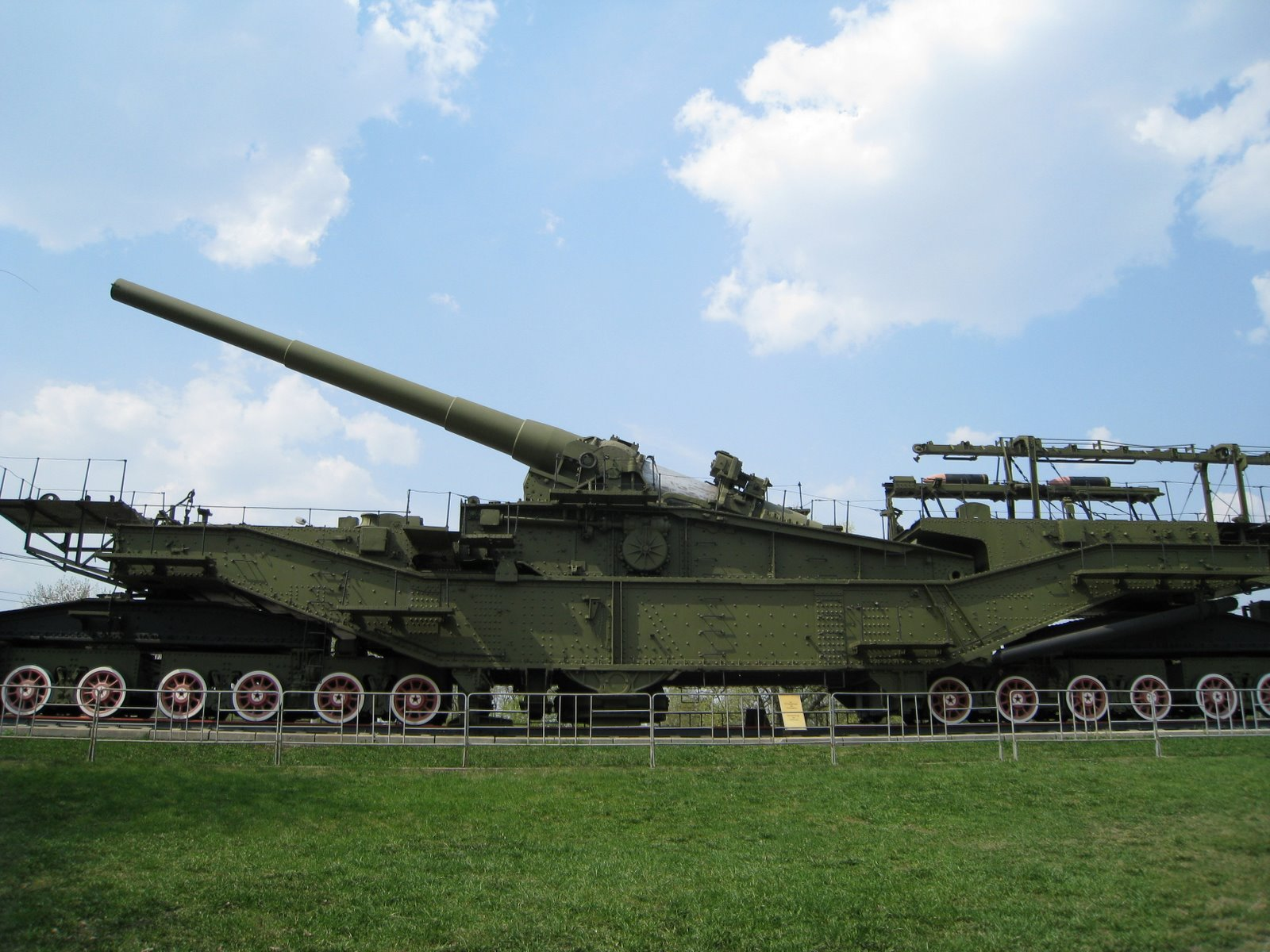
Railway gun TMK-3-12 at the Moscow Victory park
