= 130 mm/55 B7 Pattern 1913 =

130mm/55 Pattern 1913 naval gun B7
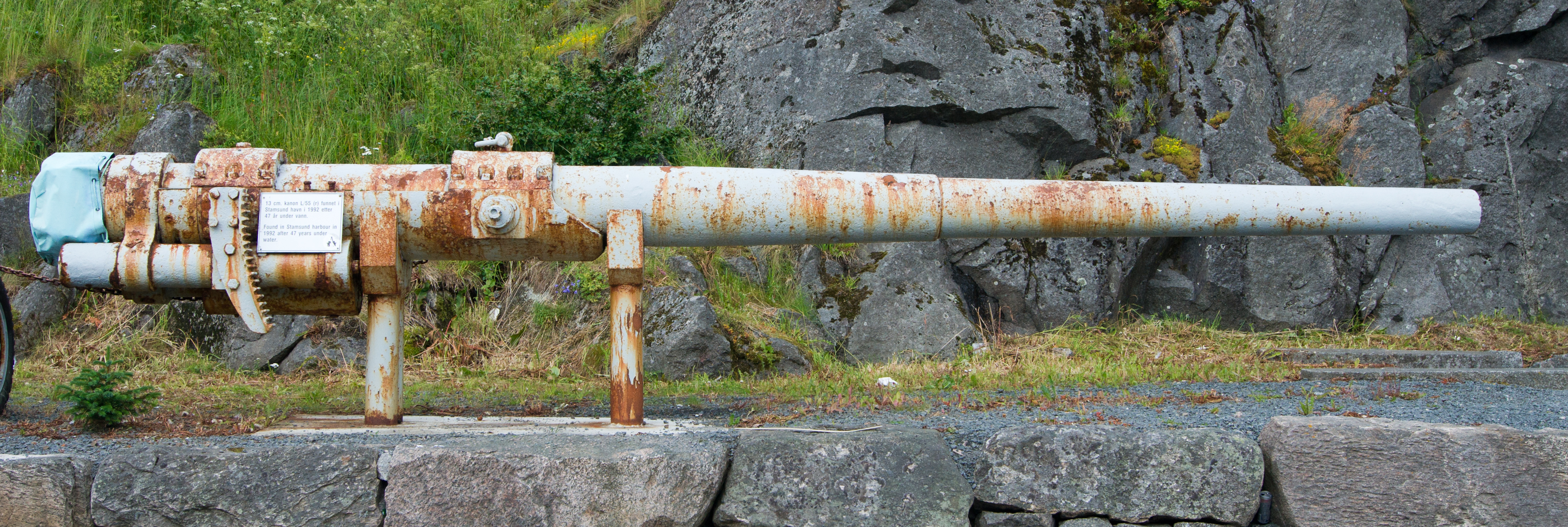
- Type: Naval gun
- Place of origin: Russian

Service history
- In service: 1914–1945?
- Used by: Russia; Soviet Union
- Wars: World War I, World War II

Production history
- Designed: 1912
- Manufacturer: Obukhov State Plant, Vickers Ltd.
- Produced: 1913 - 1925
- No. built: 571

Specifications (Pattern 1913)
- Mass: 5,290 kg (11,660 lb) (gun only)
- Length: 7,150 mm (281 in)
- Barrel length: 7,019 mm (23 ft 0.3 in) (bore); 5,862 mm (19 ft 3 in) (rifling)
- Shell: HE mod 1911
- Shell weight: 36.86 kilograms (81.3 lb)
- Caliber: 130 mm (5.12 in)
- Breech: Welin breech block
- Recoil: Hydro-spring
- Elevation: -5° / + 30°
- Traverse: 360°
- Rate of fire: 5-8 shots/minute
- Muzzle velocity: 861 m/s (2,820 ft/s)
- Maximum firing range: 20,300 m (22,200 yd)

The 130mm/55 B7 Pattern 1913 naval gun was a 5.1-inch naval gun used predominantly on ships of the Imperial Russian Navy and later by the Soviet Navy. It was manufactured mainly by the Obukhov State Plant (OSP) in St. Petersburg, as well as under licence by Vickers Limited in Great Britain. The gun was used as medium artillery on several Russian dreadnoughts and as main artillery on cruisers, as well as coastal artillery. It was succeeded by the 130 mm/50 B13 Pattern 1936 naval gun, which became the standard destroyer gun of the Soviet Navy during World War II.

== History ==
In 1911 OSP received an order to design a semi-automatic 130 mm/60 caliber naval gun for the Main Shipping Administration. The order asked for two prototypes, one for cartridges, one for rounds. On 12 July 1912 the cartridge-version with a 55 caliber barrel was approved. In September 1912 it was decided to go with the hydro-spring rather than the hydro-pneumatic recoil system. Earlier an OSP designed semi-automatic breech mechanism was rejected in favor of a Vickers design.

In 1913 an initial order of 471 guns was placed with OSP. By 1 January 1917 143 guns had been delivered, with 96 due until the end of that year. The remaining 282 guns were supposed to be delivered in 1918. The first charge of guns was used to equipped the cruiser Svetlana and the Imperatritsa Mariya-class battleships of the Black Sea Fleet.

Another order of 100 guns was placed in 1913 with Vickers Ltd., of which 24 were ready for delivery by 16 September 1914. Of these 7 were shipped to Arkhangelsk in October 1914. A further 12 guns destined for Russian cruiser Varyag were delivered to Russia on the same route as the repairs of Varyag were delayed, where they were put to the defense of Saaremaa island.

The Soviet Navy retained the 130mm/55 Pattern 1913 naval gun and produced additional guns under the designation B-7, as the OSP had been renamed Works No. 232 "Bolshevik" in 1922.

In 1923, 12 guns had been placed in four coastal batteries, one in Odessa and three along the Caucasian coast.

In 1930 a minor modernizations were made to a few guns at the "Bolshevik" works, improving the loading mechanism and enhancing elevation to +40°.
