= Leytenant Ilin-class destroyer =

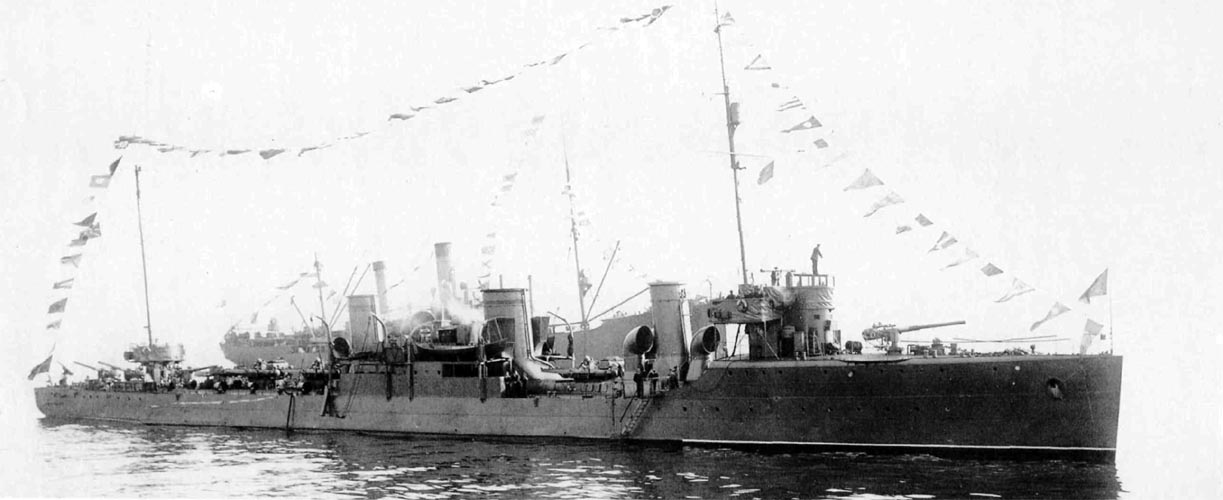
- Lenin (ex-Kapitan Izylmetev)

Class overview
- Operators: Russian Navy; Soviet Navy; Estonian Navy; Peruvian Navy
- Preceded by: Novik
- Succeeded by: Izyaslav class
- In commission: 1914–1956
- Planned: 8
- Completed: 5
- Canceled: 3
- Lost: 1
- Scrapped: 4

General characteristics (as built)
- Type: Destroyer
- Displacement: 1,360 t (1,340 long tons)
- Length: 98 m (321 ft 6 in)
- Beam: 9.34 m (30 ft 8 in)
- Draught: 2.93 m (9 ft 7 in)
- Installed power: 4 Normand boilers; 32,000 PS (24,000 kW)
- Propulsion: 2 shafts, 2 steam turbines
- Speed: 31 knots (57 km/h; 36 mph)
- Range: 1,680 nmi (3,110 km; 1,930 mi) at 21 knots (39 km/h; 24 mph)
- Complement: 150
- Armament: 4 × single 102 mm (4 in) guns; 2 × 7.62 mm (0.3 in) machine guns; 4 × triple 450 mm (17.7 in) torpedo tubes; 80 × naval mines

The Leytenant Illin-class destroyers were built for the Baltic Fleet of the Imperial Russian Navy.

== Design and description ==
The Leytenant Ilin-class ships were designed as an improved version of the Derzky class. The ships normally displaced 1,360 metric tons (1,340 long tons) and 1,562–1,600 metric tons (1,537–1,575 long tons) at full load. They measured 98 meters (321 ft 6 in) long overall with a beam of 9.34 meters (30 ft 8 in), and a draft of 3.15 meters (10 ft 4 in). The Leytenant Ilins were propelled by two Brown-Boveri-Parsons steam turbines, each driving one propeller using steam from four Normand-Vulkan boilers at a working pressure of 17 standard atmospheres (1,723 kPa; 250 psi). The turbines were designed to produce a total of 30,000 shaft horsepower (22,000 kW) for an intended maximum speed of 35 knots (65 km/h; 40 mph). During their sea trials, they only reached 28.8–32 knots (53.3–59.3 km/h; 33.1–36.8 mph) from 28,000–30,666 shp (20,880–22,868 kW). The ships carried between 159–350 t (156–344 long tons) of fuel oil which gave them a range of 1,680 nautical miles (3,110 km; 1,930 mi) at 21 knots (39 km/h; 24 mph). Their crew numbered 150.

The Leytenant Ilin-class ships were originally intended to have an armament of two 60-caliber 102 mm (four in) Pattern 1911 Obukhov guns, one gun each on the forecastle and stern, and a dozen 450-millimeter (17.7 in) torpedo tubes in six double mounts. The Naval General Staff changed this to four triple mounts once they became available in 1914; based on a battle between the destroyer Novik and two German destroyers in August 1915, they decided to exchange the rearmost torpedo mount for two more 102 mm guns on the stern while the ships were still under construction. All of these guns were on the centerline and interfered with each other's movements. Anti-aircraft defense was provided by a 40 mm (1.6 in) anti-aircraft (AA) gun in a single mount amidships. The Leytenant Ilins were completed with one triple torpedo mount between the forward funnels and two mounts aft of the rear funnel. The ships could carry 80 M1912 naval mines. They were also fitted with a Barr and Stroud rangefinder and two 60-centimeter (24 in) searchlights.

== Ships ==
Built at the Putilov yard, St Petersburg

Construction data
Ship (original name in Russian service)	Name(s) in Soviet or foreign services (ships were renamed)	Laid down	Launched	Completed	Fate
Kapitan Belli	Karl Libknekht	15 July 1913	10 October 1915	3 August 1928	Transferred to the Soviet Northern Fleet. Broken up 1950s
Kapitan Izylmetev	Lenin	18 June 1913	21 October 1914	10 July 1916	Scuttled while under repair, 24 June 1941 at Liepāja, Latvia
Kapitan Kern	Rykov renamed Valerian Kuybyshev	21 November 1913	10 October 1915	15 October 1927	Transferred to the Soviet Northern Fleet. Broken up 1950s
Kapitan Konon-Zotov	NA	21 November 1913	10 October 1915	NA	Broken up incomplete, 1923
Kapitan Kroun	NA	15 November 1914	23 July 1916	NA	
Kapitan I ranga Miklucha Maklai	Spartak (1917) renamed Estonian Wambola renamed Peruvian Almirante Villar	23 October 1914	14 August 1915	12 December 1917	Captured by the British in 1918, given to the Estonian Navy and sold by the Estonians to Peru in 1933. Scrapped in 1954
Leytenant Dubasov	NA	15 July 1913	27 August 1916	NA	Broken up incomplete, 1923
Leytenant Ilin	Garibaldi renamed Trotsky renamed Voykov	18 June 1913	15 November 1914	30 November 1916	transferred to the Soviet Pacific Fleet. Broken up 1950s

== Bibliography ==
- Apalkov, Yu. V. (1996). Боевые корабли русского флота: 8.1914-10.1917г [Combat Ships of the Russian Fleet: 8.1914-10.1917] (in Russian). ИНТЕК. ISBN 5-7559-0018-3.
- Berezhnoy, S. S. (2002). Крейсера и Миносцы: Справочик [Cruisers and Destroyers: Reference] (in Russian). Moscow: Ввоенное Ииздательство. ISBN 5-203-01780-8.
- Budzbon, Przemysław (2026). "The High-Speed Destroyers of the Novik Type: Part I". In Jordan, John (ed.). Warship 2026. Osprey Publishing. pp. 8–29. ISBN 978-1-4728-7259-3.
- Budzbon, Przemysław (1985). "Russia". In Gray, Randal (ed.). Conway's All the World's Fighting Ships 1906–1921. Naval Institute Press. pp. 291–325. ISBN 0-85177-245-5.
- Budzbon, Przemysław; Radziemski, Jan & Twardowski, Marek (2022). Warships of the Soviet Fleets 1939–1945. Vol. I: Major Combatants. Naval Institute Press. ISBN 978-1-68247-877-6.
- Friedman, Norman (2011). Naval Weapons of World War One: Guns, Torpedoes, Mines and ASW Weapons of All Nations; An Illustrated Directory. Seaforth Publishing. ISBN 978-1-84832-100-7.
- Greger, René (1972). The Russian Fleet, 1914-1917. Ian Allan. ISBN 0-7110-0255-X.
- O'Hara, Vincent (2017). Clash of Fleets: Naval Battles of the Great War, 1914-18. Naval Institute Press. ISBN 978-1-68247-008-4.
- Platonov, Andrey V. (2002). Энциклопедия советских надводных кораблей 1941–1945 [Encyclopedia of Soviet Surface Ships 1941–1945] (in Russian). Poligon. ISBN 5-89173-178-9.
- Rohwer, Jürgen (2005). Chronology of the War at Sea 1939–1945: The Naval History of World War Two (Third Revised ed.). Naval Institute Press. ISBN 1-59114-119-2.
- Staff, Gary (2009). Battle for the Baltic Islands 1917: Triumph of the Imperial German Navy. Pen and Sword Maritime. ISBN 978-1-84415-787-7.
- Verstyuk, Anatoly & Gordeyev, Stanislav (2006). Корабли Минных дивизий. От "Новика" до "Гогланда" [Torpedo Division Ships: From Novik to Gogland] (in Russian). Voennaya Kniga. ISBN 5-902863-10-4.
- Zubkov, Dmitry (2025). Soviet and Russians Destroyer Exports. Vol. 1: Imperial Russian-Built Destroyers in Service with Foreign Navies, 1904–1954. Helion. ISBN 978-1-804515-58-7.
