= Soviet destroyer Karl Libknekht =

Imperial Russian and Soviet destroyer

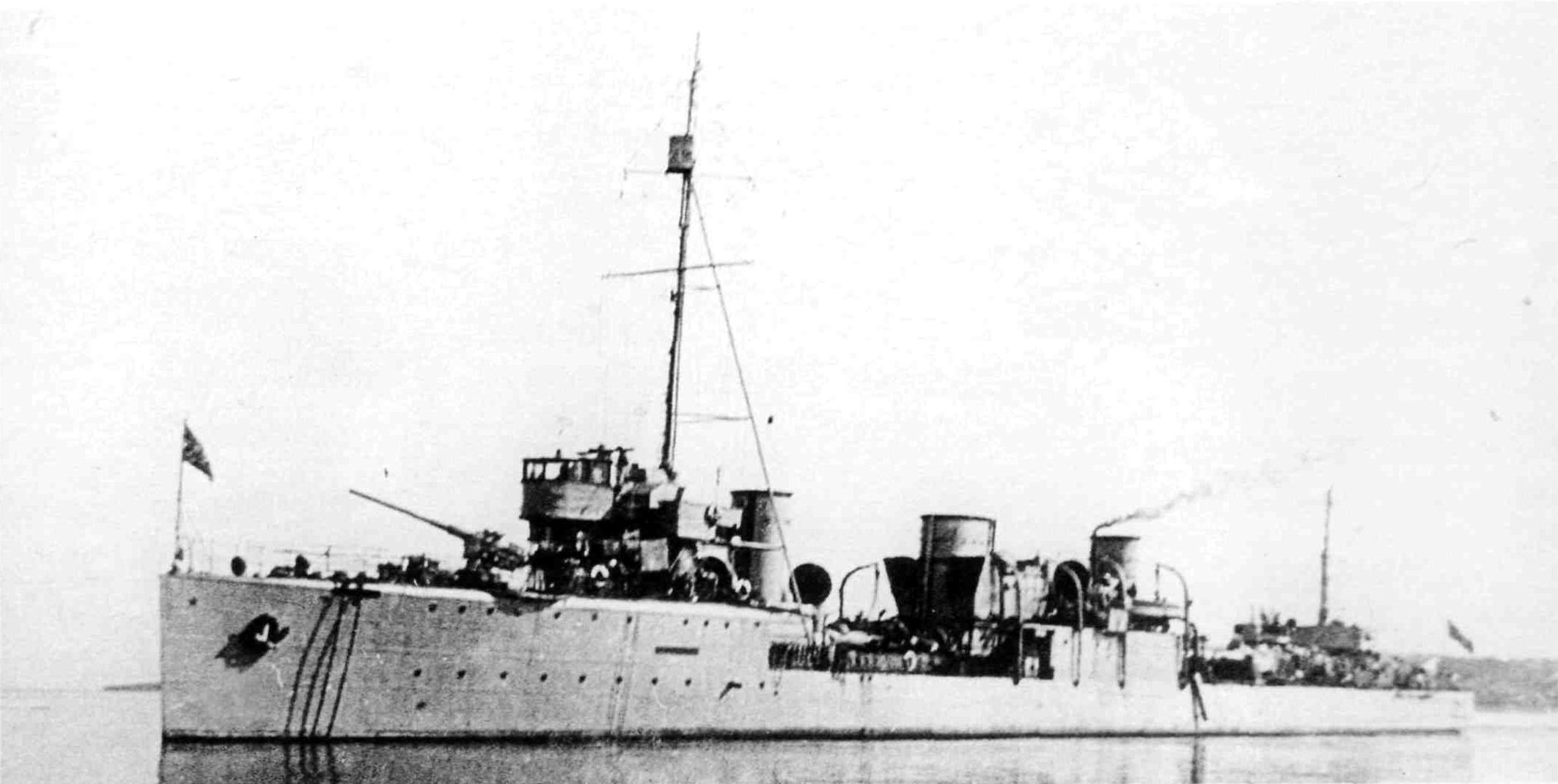

History

Russian Empire
- Name: Kapitan Belli
- Builder: Putilov Shipyard, Saint Petersburg
- Laid down: 16 November 1913
- Launched: 10 October 1915
- Fate: Seized by the Bolsheviks, November 1917

Soviet Union
- Name: Kapitan Belli
- Namesake: Karl Liebknecht
- Acquired: November 1917
- Commissioned: 3 August 1928
- Renamed: Karl Libknekht, 13 July 1926; PPR-63, 1956
- Reclassified: As target ship, 1955; As floating jetty, 30 December 1955
- Refit: 28 October 1940–8 November 1944
- Stricken: 3 June 1955
- Fate: Disarmed and converted into a floating jetty, 30 December 1955

General characteristics (as built)
- Class & type: Leytenant Ilin-class destroyer
- Displacement: 1,360 t (1,340 long tons)
- Length: 98 m (321 ft 6 in)
- Beam: 9.34 m (30 ft 8 in)
- Draught: 4.2 m (13 ft 9 in) (deep load)
- Installed power: 4 water-tube boilers; 30,000 shp (22,000 kW)
- Propulsion: 2 shafts, 2 steam turbines
- Speed: 30 knots (56 km/h; 35 mph)
- Range: 1,720 nmi (3,190 km; 1,980 mi) at 16 knots (30 km/h; 18 mph)
- Complement: 150
- Armament: 4 × single 102 mm (4 in) guns; 1 × single 76 mm (3 in) AA gun; 3 × triple 45 cm (17.7 in) torpedo tubes; 80 mines

Karl Libknekht (Russian: Карл Либкнехт) was an Leytenant Ilin-class destroyer built for the Imperial Russian Navy during World War I under the name of Kapitan Belli (Russian: Капитан Белли). Launched in 1915, construction was suspended for the rest of the war. She was seized by the Bolsheviks during the October Revolution, but construction did not resume until 1925. The ship was renamed Karl Libknekht the following year Completed in 1928 and serving in the Baltic Fleet, she was transferred to the Northern Flotilla five years later.

== Design and description ==
The Leytenant Ilin-class ships were designed as an improved version of the Derzky class. The ships normally displaced 1,360 long tons (1,380 t) and 1,562–1,600 long tons (1,587–1,626 t) at full load. They measured 98 meters (321 ft 6 in) long overall with a beam of 9.34 meters (30 ft 8 in), and a draft of 3.15 meters (10 ft 4 in). The Leytenant Ilins were propelled by two Brown-Boveri-Parsons steam turbines, each driving one propeller using steam from four Normand-Vulcan boilers. The turbines were designed to produce a total of 30,000 shaft horsepower (22,000 kW) for an intended maximum speed of 35 knots (65 km/h; 40 mph) using forced draft. On Karl Libknekht's sea trials on 2 August 1928, she reached 32 knots (59 km/h; 37 mph). The ship carried enough fuel oil to provide a range of 1,720 nautical miles (3,190 km; 1,980 mi) at 16 knots (30 km/h; 18 mph). Their crew numbered 150.

The Leytenant Ilin-class ships were originally intended to have an armament of two single four-inch (102 mm) Pattern 1911 Obukhov guns and a dozen 450-millimeter (17.7 in) torpedo tubes in six double mounts. The Naval General Staff changed this to four triple mounts once they became available and then decided to exchange a torpedo mount for two more four-inch guns in August 1915 while the ships were still under construction. One of these guns was mounted on the forecastle and three on the stern, aft of the torpedo tubes. All of these guns were on the centerline and interfered with each other's movements. Anti-aircraft defense was provided by a 3-inch (76 mm) Lender anti-aircraft (AA) gun in a single mount amidships. The Leytenant Ilins were completed with one triple torpedo mount between the forward funnels and two mounts aft of the rear funnel. The ships could carry 80 M1912 naval mines. They were also fitted with a Barr and Stroud rangefinder and two 60-centimeter (24 in) searchlights.

== Construction and career ==
Kapitan Belli was launched on 10 October 1915, but construction was suspended on 2 August 1918 with the ship 95 percent complete. Funds to complete the ship were not available until 2 September 1924, but she broke loose from her moorings during a severe flood on 24 September and grounded on a sand bank. The ship was only slightly damaged, but extensive dredging work was required to refloat her. Kapitan Belli was towed to Leningrad in mid-1925 to be completed at the Severnaya Verf shipyard. The ship was renamed Karl Libknekht on 13 July 1926 in honor of the executed co-founder of the Communist Party of Germany while being worked on. She was commissioned on 3 August 1928 and assigned to the Baltic Fleet. Karl Libknekht was transferred to the Arctic Flotilla in 1933 via the White Sea Canal.

== Bibliography ==
- Apalkov, Yu. V. (1996). Боевые корабли русского флота: 8.1914-10.1917г [Combat Ships of the Russian Fleet: 8.1914-10.1917] (in Russian). Saint Petersburg, Russia: ИНТЕК. ISBN 5-7559-0018-3.
- Berezhnoy, S. S. (2002). Крейсера и Миносцы: Справочик [Cruisers and Destroyers: Reference] (in Russian). Moscow: Ввоенное Ииздательство. ISBN 5-203-01780-8.
- Breyer, Siegfried (1992). Soviet Warship Development: Volume 1: 1917–1937. London: Conway Maritime Press. ISBN 0-85177-604-3.
- Chernyshev, Alexander (2007). "Новики": Лучшие эсминцы российского императосого флота ["Noviki": The Best Destroyers of the Imperial Russian Navy] (in Russian). Moscow: Эксмо. ISBN 978-5-699-23164-5.
- Budzbon, Przemysław (1985). "Russia". In Gray, Randal (ed.). Conway's All the World's Fighting Ships 1906–1921. Annapolis, Maryland: Naval Institute Press. pp. 291–325. ISBN 0-85177-245-5.
- Budzbon, Przemysław; Radziemski, Jan & Twardowski, Marek (2022). Warships of the Soviet Fleets 1939–1945. Vol. I: Major Combatants. Annapolis, Maryland: Naval Institute Press. ISBN 978-1-68247-877-6.
- Verstyuk, Anatoly & Gordeyev, Stanislav (2006). Корабли Минных дивизий. От "Новика" до "Гогланда" [Torpedo Division Ships: From Novik to Gogland] (in Russian). Moscow: Voennaya Kniga. ISBN 5-902863-10-4.
- Watts, Anthony J. (1990). The Imperial Russian Navy. London: Arms and Armour. ISBN 0-85368-912-1.
