= Soviet destroyer Valerian Kuybyshev =

Imperial Russian and Soviet destroyer

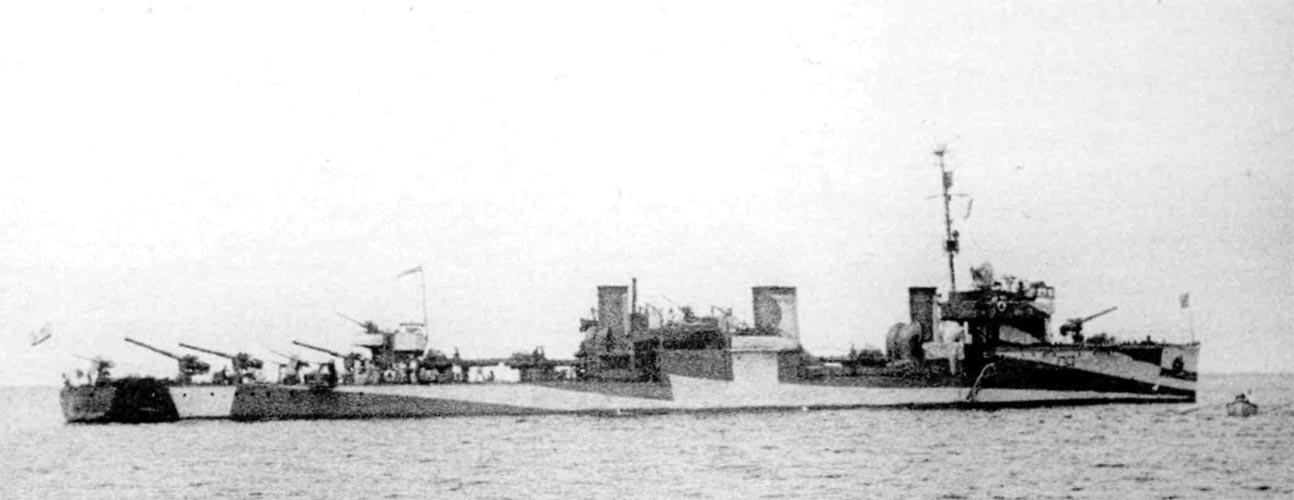

History

Russian Empire
- Name: Kapitan Kern
- Builder: Putilov Shipyard, Saint Petersburg
- Laid down: 21 November 1913
- Launched: 14 August 1915
- Fate: Seized by the Bolsheviks, November 1917

Soviet Union
- Name: Kapitan Kern
- Namesake: Alexei Rykov; Valerian Kuybyshev
- Acquired: November 1917
- Commissioned: 15 October 1927
- Renamed: Rykov, 31 March 1925; Valerian Kuybyshev, 13 February 1937
- Reclassified: As a target ship, 30 December 1955
- Stricken: 12 December 1956
- Fate: Scrapped, 1957–1958

General characteristics (as built)
- Class & type: Leytnant Ilin-class destroyer
- Displacement: 1,303 long tons (1,324 t) (standard)
- Length: 98 m (321 ft 6 in)
- Beam: 9.34 m (30 ft 8 in)
- Draught: 4 m (13 ft 1 in) (deep load)
- Installed power: 4 water-tube boilers; 30,000 shp (22,000 kW)
- Propulsion: 2 shafts, 2 steam turbines
- Speed: 30 knots (56 km/h; 35 mph)
- Range: 1,680 nmi (3,110 km; 1,930 mi) at 21 knots (39 km/h; 24 mph)
- Complement: 150
- Armament: 4 × single 102 mm (4 in) guns; 1 × single 76 mm (3 in) AA gun; 1 × single 37 mm (1.5 in) AA gun; 3 × triple 45 cm (17.7 in) torpedo tubes; 80 mines

Valerian Kuybyshev (Russian: Валериан Куйбышев) was an Leytenant Ilin-class destroyer built for the Imperial Russian Navy during World War I under the name of Kapitan Kern (Russian: Капитан Керн). Launched in 1915, construction was suspended at the end of 1917. She was seized by the Bolsheviks during the October Revolution, but construction did not resume until 1924. The ship was renamed Rykov (Russian: Рыков) the following year. Completed in 1927 and serving in the Baltic Fleet, she was transferred to the Northern Flotilla six years later.

== Design and description ==
The Leytenant Ilin-class ships were designed as an improved version of the Derzky class. The ships normally displaced 1,360 long tons (1,380 t) and 1,562–1,600 long tons (1,587–1,626 t) at full load. They measured 98 meters (321 ft 6 in) long overall with a beam of 9.34 meters (30 ft 8 in), and a draft of 3.15 meters (10 ft 4 in). The Leytenant Ilins were propelled by two Brown-Boveri-Parsons steam turbines, each driving one propeller using steam from four Normand-Vulcan boilers. The turbines were designed to produce a total of 30,000 shaft horsepower (22,000 kW) for an intended maximum speed of 35 knots (65 km/h; 40 mph) using forced draft. On Kapitan Izylmetev's sea trials, she only reached 29.54 knots (54.71 km/h; 33.99 mph) from 28,754 shp (21,442 kW). The ships carried enough fuel oil to give them a range of 1,680 nautical miles (3,110 km; 1,930 mi) at 21 knots (39 km/h; 24 mph). Their crew numbered 150.

The Leytenant Ilin-class ships were originally intended to have an armament of two single four-inch (102 mm) Pattern 1911 Obukhov guns and a dozen 450-millimeter (17.7 in) torpedo tubes in six double mounts. The Naval General Staff changed this to four triple mounts once they became available and then decided to exchange a torpedo mount for two more four-inch guns in August 1915 while the ships were still under construction. One of these guns was mounted on the forecastle and three on the stern, aft of the torpedo tubes. All of these guns were on the centerline and interfered with each other's movements. Anti-aircraft defense was provided by a 37 mm (1.5 in) anti-aircraft (AA) gun and a 3-inch (76 mm) Lender AA gun, both in single mounts amidships. The Leytenant Ilins were completed with one triple torpedo mount between the forward funnels and two mounts aft of the rear funnel. The ships could carry 80 M1912 naval mines. They were also fitted with a Barr and Stroud rangefinder and two 60-centimeter (24 in) searchlights.

== Construction and career ==
Kapitan Kern was launched on 14 August 1916, but she was 60 percent completed at the end of 1917 when construction was suspended. Work on the ship began again in 1924 and she was renamed Rykov on 31 March 1925. The ship was commissioned on 15 October 1927 and assigned to the Baltic Fleet. Rykov was transferred to the Northern Flotilla in 1933.

== Bibliography ==
- Apalkov, Yu. V. (1996). Боевые корабли русского флота: 8.1914-10.1917г [Combat Ships of the Russian Fleet: 8.1914-10.1917] (in Russian). Saint Petersburg, Russia: ИНТЕК. ISBN 5-7559-0018-3.
- Berezhnoy, S. S. (2002). Крейсера и Миносцы: Справочик [Cruisers and Destroyers: Reference] (in Russian). Moscow: Ввоенное Ииздательство. ISBN 5-203-01780-8.
- Breyer, Siegfried (1992). Soviet Warship Development: Volume 1: 1917–1937. London: Conway Maritime Press. ISBN 0-85177-604-3.
- Chernyshev, Alexander (2007). "Новики": Лучшие эсминцы российского императосого флота ["Noviki": The Best Destroyers of the Imperial Russian Navy] (in Russian). Moscow: Эксмо. ISBN 978-5-699-23164-5.
- Budzbon, Przemysław (1985). "Russia". In Gray, Randal (ed.). Conway's All the World's Fighting Ships 1906–1921. Annapolis, Maryland: Naval Institute Press. pp. 291–325. ISBN 0-85177-245-5.
- Budzbon, Przemysław; Radziemski, Jan & Twardowski, Marek (2022). Warships of the Soviet Fleets 1939–1945. Vol. I: Major Combatants. Annapolis, Maryland: Naval Institute Press. ISBN 978-1-68247-877-6.
- Verstyuk, Anatoly & Gordeyev, Stanislav (2006). Корабли Минных дивизий. От "Новика" до "Гогланда" [Torpedo Division Ships: From Novik to Gogland] (in Russian). Moscow: Voennaya Kniga. ISBN 5-902863-10-4.
- Watts, Anthony J. (1990). The Imperial Russian Navy. London: Arms and Armour. ISBN 0-85368-912-1.
