= Soviet destroyer Lenin =

Imperial Russian and Soviet destroyer

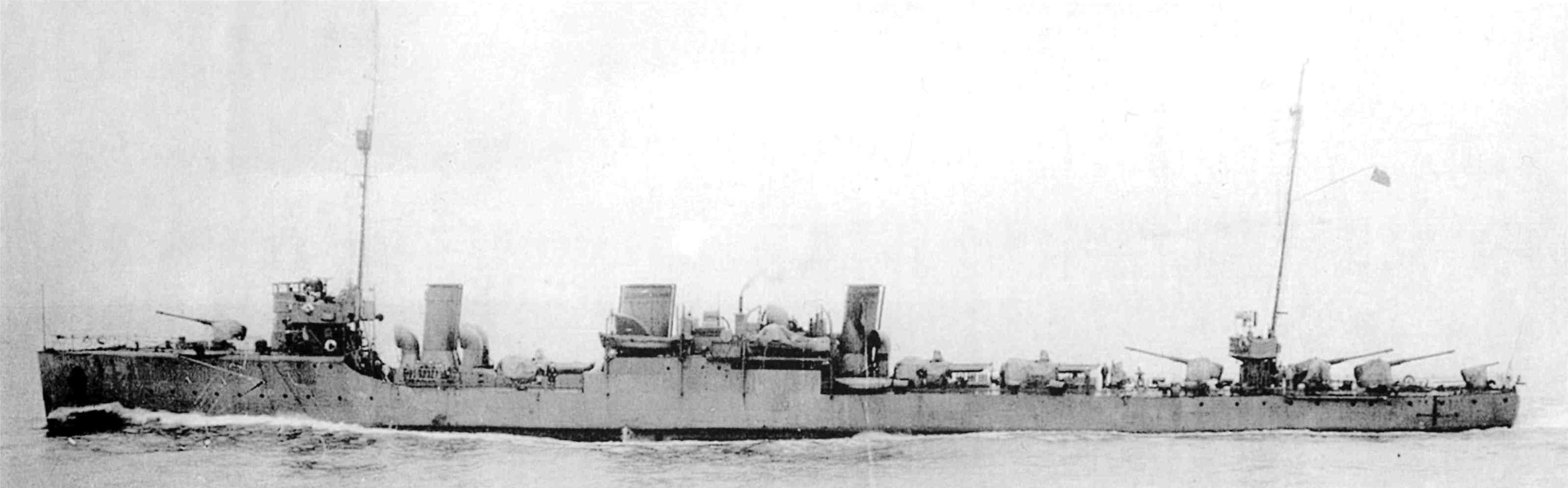

History

Russian Empire
- Name: Kapitan Izylmetev
- Builder: Putilov Shipyard, Saint Petersburg
- Laid down: 16 November 1913
- Launched: 21 October 1914
- Completed: 11 July 1916
- Fate: Seized by the Bolsheviks, November 1917

Soviet Union
- Name: Lenin
- Namesake: Vladimir Lenin
- Acquired: November 1917
- Commissioned: 19 January 1918
- Recommissioned: 17 September 1919
- Decommissioned: October 1918
- Renamed: Lenin (31 December 1922)
- Refit: 1924–1925
- Fate: Scuttled, 25 June 1941

General characteristics (as built)
- Class & type: Leytenant Ilin-class destroyer
- Displacement: 1,360 t (1,340 long tons)
- Length: 98 m (321 ft 6 in)
- Beam: 9.34 m (30 ft 8 in)
- Draught: 3.15 m (10 ft 4 in)
- Installed power: 4 water-tube boilers; 30,000 shp (22,000 kW)
- Propulsion: 2 shafts, 2 steam turbines
- Speed: 32 knots (59 km/h; 37 mph)
- Range: 1,680 nmi (3,110 km; 1,930 mi) at 21 knots (39 km/h; 24 mph)
- Complement: 150
- Armament: 4 × single 102 mm (4 in) guns; 1 × single 40 mm (1.6 in) AA gun; 3 × triple 45 cm (17.7 in) torpedo tubes; 80 mines

Lenin (Russian: Ленин) was a Leytenant Ilin-class destroyer built for the Imperial Russian Navy during World War I under the name of Kapitan Izylmetev (Russian: Капитан Изыльметьев). Completed in 1916, she served with the Baltic Fleet. The ship was taken over by the Bolsheviks during the October Revolution in 1917 and renamed Lenin five years later.

== Design and description ==
The Leytenant Ilin-class ships were designed as an improved version of the Derzky class. The ships normally displaced 1,360 long tons (1,380 t) and 1,562–1,600 long tons (1,587–1,626 t) at full load. They measured 98 meters (321 ft 6 in) long overall with a beam of 9.34 meters (30 ft 8 in), and a draft of 3.15 meters (10 ft 4 in). The Leytenant Ilins were propelled by two Brown-Boveri-Parsons steam turbines, each driving one propeller using steam from four Normand-Vulcan boilers. The turbines were designed to produce a total of 30,000 shaft horsepower (22,000 kW) for an intended maximum speed of 35 knots (65 km/h; 40 mph) using forced draft. On Kapitan Izylmetev's sea trials, she only reached 30.8 knots (57.0 km/h; 35.4 mph) from 30,500 shp (22,700 kW). The ships carried enough fuel oil to give them a range of 1,680 nautical miles (3,110 km; 1,930 mi) at 21 knots (39 km/h; 24 mph). Their crew numbered 150.

The Leytenant Ilin-class ships were originally intended to have an armament of two single four-inch (102 mm) Pattern 1911 Obukhov guns and a dozen 450-millimeter (17.7 in) torpedo tubes in six double mounts. The Naval General Staff changed this to four triple mounts once they became available and then decided to exchange a torpedo mount for two more four-inch guns in August 1915 while the ships were still under construction. One of these guns was mounted on the forecastle and three on the stern, aft of the torpedo tubes. All of these guns were on the centerline and interfered with each other's movements. Anti-aircraft defense was provided by a 40 mm (1.6 in) anti-aircraft (AA) gun in a single mount amidships. The Leytenant Ilins were completed with one triple torpedo mount between the forward funnels and two mounts aft of the rear funnel. The ships could carry 80 M1912 naval mines. They were also fitted with a Barr and Stroud rangefinder and two 60-centimeter (24 in) searchlights.

== Construction and career ==
Kapitan Izylmetev was completed in 1916 and participated in operations during the First World War. Her crew joined the Bolsheviks after the October Revolution in 1917 and the ship was renamed Lenin on 31 December 1922.

Lenin was scuttled at the Soviet naval base in Liepāja, Latvia, on June 24, 1941, along with multiple other Soviet warships, to prevent her from being captured by German forces during Operation Barbarossa.

== Bibliography ==
- Apalkov, Yu. V. (1996). Боевые корабли русского флота: 8.1914-10.1917г [Combat Ships of the Russian Fleet: 8.1914-10.1917] (in Russian). Saint Petersburg, Russia: ИНТЕК. ISBN 5-7559-0018-3.
- Berezhnoy, S. S. (2002). Крейсера и Миносцы: Справочик [Cruisers and Destroyers: Reference] (in Russian). Moscow: Ввоенное Ииздательство. ISBN 5-203-01780-8.
- Breyer, Siegfried (1992). Soviet Warship Development: Volume 1: 1917–1937. London: Conway Maritime Press. ISBN 0-85177-604-3.
- Chernyshev, Alexander (2007). "Новики": Лучшие эсминцы российского императосого флота ["Noviki": The Best Destroyers of the Imperial Russian Navy] (in Russian). Moscow: Эксмо. ISBN 978-5-699-23164-5.
- Budzbon, Przemysław (1985). "Russia". In Gray, Randal (ed.). Conway's All the World's Fighting Ships 1906–1921. Annapolis, Maryland: Naval Institute Press. pp. 291–325. ISBN 0-85177-245-5.
- Budzbon, Przemysław; Radziemski, Jan & Twardowski, Marek (2022). Warships of the Soviet Fleets 1939–1945. Vol. I: Major Combatants. Annapolis, Maryland: Naval Institute Press. ISBN 978-1-68247-877-6.
- Verstyuk, Anatoly & Gordeyev, Stanislav (2006). Корабли Минных дивизий. От "Новика" до "Гогланда" [Torpedo Division Ships: From Novik to Gogland] (in Russian). Moscow: Voennaya Kniga. ISBN 5-902863-10-4.
- Watts, Anthony J. (1990). The Imperial Russian Navy. London: Arms and Armour. ISBN 0-85368-912-1.
