= Russian destroyer Gnevny =

Imperial Russian destroyer

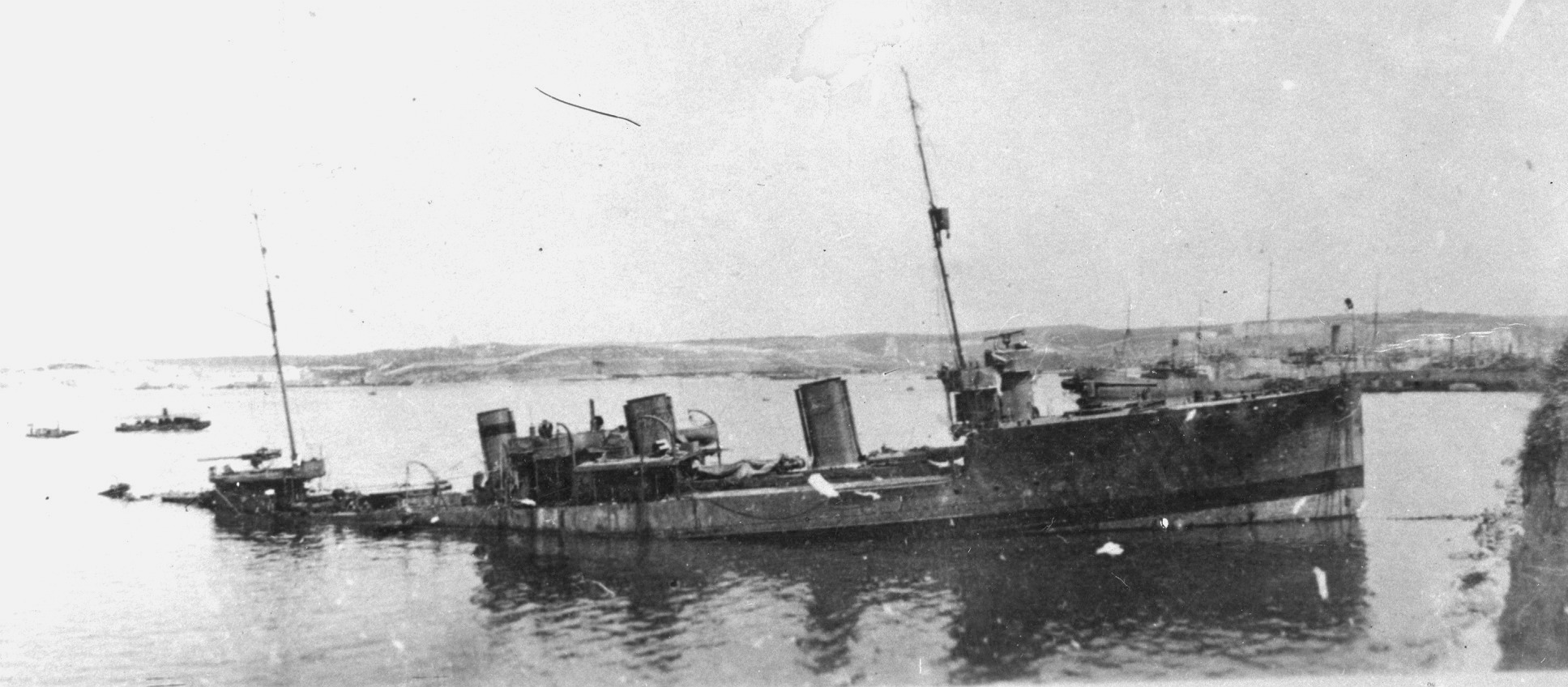
- Gnevny aground and partially submerged off Sevastopol, May 1918

History

Russian Empire
- Name: Gnevny
- Builder: Naval Yard, Nikolayev
- Laid down: 1912
- Launched: 18 October 1913
- Completed: 16 October 1914
- Fate: Captured by German Empire, 1 May 1918

German Empire
- Acquired: 1 May 1918
- Renamed: R-3
- Fate: Turned over to the United Kingdom, November 1918

United Kingdom
- Acquired: November 1918
- Fate: Turned over to Wrangel's fleet, September 1919

White Army
- Name: Gnevny
- Operator: Wrangel's Fleet
- Acquired: September 1919
- Out of service: 29 December 1920
- Fate: Scrapped, early 1930s

General characteristics (as built)
- Class & type: Derzky-class destroyer
- Displacement: 1,185 t (1,166 long tons)
- Length: 93.82 m (307 ft 10 in)
- Beam: 9.02 m (29 ft 7 in)
- Draught: 3.42 m (11 ft 3 in) (deep load)
- Installed power: 5 Vulkan-Thornycroft boilers; 23,000 shp (17,000 kW)
- Propulsion: 2 shafts, 2 steam turbines
- Speed: 30 knots (56 km/h; 35 mph)
- Range: 1,717 nmi (3,180 km; 1,976 mi) at 21 knots (39 km/h; 24 mph) (estimated)
- Complement: 111
- Armament: 3 × single 102 mm (4 in) guns; 2 × single 7.62 mm (0.30 in) machine guns; 5 × twin 45 mm (1.8 in) torpedo tubes; 80 mines

Gnevny (Russian: Гневный) was a Derzky-class destroyers built for the Imperial Russian Navy shortly before World War I. Completed in 1914, she served with the Black Sea Fleet.

== Design and description ==
In 1911, the Imperial Russian Navy conducted a design competition for destroyers to serve with the Black Sea Fleet based on the successful design of the Novik. The Navy selected the design submitted by the Putilov Shipyard, but only awarded a contract for one ship to Putilov. Contracts for two ships were given to St. Petersburg Metal Works and Nevsky Shipyard. All three of these shipyards were in Saint Petersburg and would have to assemble their ships on the Black Sea. The Navy awarded four destroyers to OSNiV in Mykolaiv, Ukraine, based on a promise of early delivery. It also allowed the company to alter the design as necessary.

Gnevny was one of the OSNiV-designed ships. They normally displaced 1,180–1,191 long tons (1,199–1,210 t) and 1,405–1,464 long tons (1,428–1,487 t) at full load. They measured 93.82–93.9 meters (307 ft 10 in – 308 ft 1 in) long overall with a beam of 9.02–9.3 meters (29 ft 7 in – 30 ft 6 in), and a draft of 3.2–3.42 meters (10 ft 6 in – 11 ft 3 in). The ships were propelled by two Boveri-Brown-Parsons steam turbines, each driving one propeller shaft using steam from five Vulkan-Thornycroft boilers. The turbines were designed to produce a total of 25,500 shaft horsepower (19,000 kW) for an intended maximum speed of 34 knots (63 km/h; 39 mph). During Gnevny's sea trials, she only reached 30 knots (56 km/h; 35 mph) from 23,000 shp (17,000 kW). The ships carried enough fuel oil to give them an estimated range of 1,717 nautical miles (3,180 km; 1,976 mi) at 21 knots (39 km/h; 24 mph). Their crew numbered 111.

The main armament of the Dzerky-class ships did not vary between the two designs. It consisted of three single four-inch (102 mm) Pattern 1911 Obukhov guns and ten 450-millimeter (17.7 in) torpedo tubes in five twin mounts. One of these guns was mounted on the forecastle and a superfiring pair on the stern, aft of the torpedo tubes. All of the ships were initially fitted with two 7.62 mm (0.30 in) machine guns, with most ships receiving another pair of guns during the war. A pair of 47 mm (1.9 in) anti-aircraft (AA) guns were also added during the war. The ships could carry 80 M1912 naval mines. They were also fitted with a Barr and Stroud rangefinder and two 60-centimeter (24 in) searchlights.

== Construction and career ==
Gnevny was laid down by OSNiV in September 1912. Completed in 1914, she was assigned to the Black Sea Fleet. Her crew joined the Bolsheviks in December 1917. She was scuttled by her crew in April 1918, but was salvaged by the Germans.

== Bibliography ==
- Apalkov, Yu. V. (1996). Боевые корабли русского флота: 8.1914-10.1917г [Combat Ships of the Russian Fleet: 8.1914-10.1917] (in Russian). Saint Petersburg, Russia: ИНТЕК. ISBN 5-7559-0018-3.
- Berezhnoy, S. S. (2002). Крейсера и Миносцы: Справочик [Cruisers and Destroyers: Reference] (in Russian). Moscow: Ввоенное Ииздательство. ISBN 5-203-01780-8.
- Breyer, Siegfried (1992). Soviet Warship Development: Volume 1: 1917–1937. London: Conway Maritime Press. ISBN 0-85177-604-3.
- Chernyshev, Alexander (2007). "Новики": Лучшие эсминцы российского императосого флота ["Noviki": The Best Destroyers of the Imperial Russian Navy] (in Russian). Moscow: Эксмо. ISBN 978-5-699-23164-5.
- Budzbon, Przemysław (1985). "Russia". In Gray, Randal (ed.). Conway's All the World's Fighting Ships 1906–1921. Annapolis, Maryland: Naval Institute Press. pp. 291–325. ISBN 0-85177-245-5.
- Budzbon, Przemysław; Radziemski, Jan & Twardowski, Marek (2022). Warships of the Soviet Fleets 1939–1945. Vol. I: Major Combatants. Annapolis, Maryland: Naval Institute Press. ISBN 978-1-68247-877-6.
- Verstyuk, Anatoly & Gordeyev, Stanislav (2006). Корабли Минных дивизий. От "Новика" до "Гогланда" [Torpedo Division Ships: From Novik to Gogland] (in Russian). Moscow: Voennaya Kniga. ISBN 5-902863-10-4.
- Watts, Anthony J. (1990). The Imperial Russian Navy. London: Arms and Armour. ISBN 0-85368-912-1.
- Zubkov, Dmitry (2025). Soviet and Russians Destroyer Exports. Vol. 1: Imperial Russian-Built Destroyers in Service with Foreign Navies, 1904–1954. Helion. ISBN 978-1-804515-58-7.
