= Russian destroyer Schastlivy =

Imperial Russian destroyer

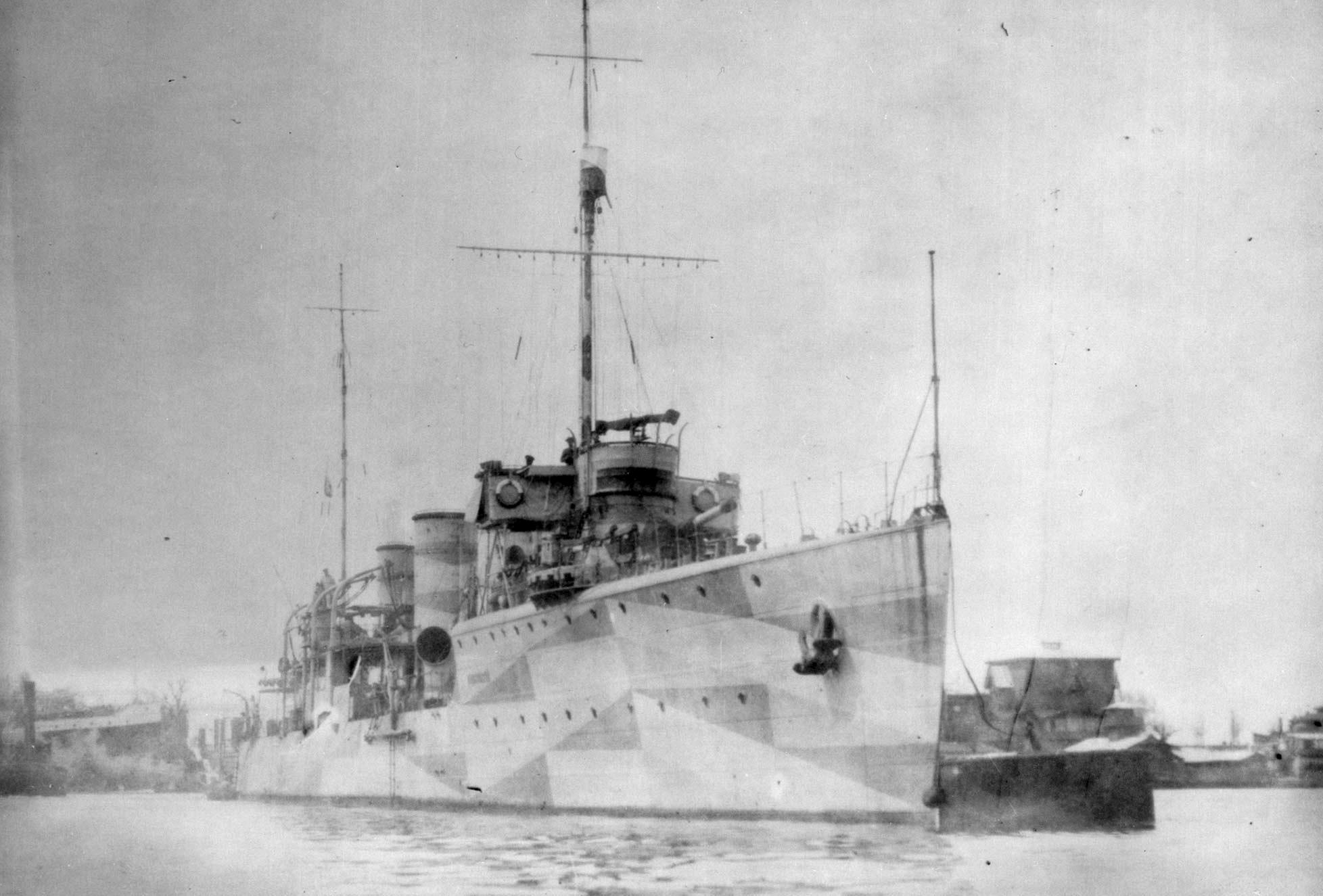

History

Russian Empire
- Name: Schastlivy
- Builder: Putilov Shipyard, Saint Petersburg (built); Vaddon, Kherson (assembled)
- Laid down: 16 October 1913
- Launched: 25 May 1914
- Completed: 18 April 1915
- Fate: Captured by German Empire, 1 May 1918

German Empire
- Acquired: 1 May 1918
- In service: 7 August 1918
- Renamed: R-1
- Fate: Captured by British forces, 24 November 1918

United Kingdom
- Acquired: 24 November 1918
- Fate: Wrecked, 24 October 1919

General characteristics (as built)
- Class & type: Derzky-class destroyer
- Displacement: 1,110 t (1,090 long tons)
- Length: 98 m (321 ft 6 in)
- Beam: 9.3–9.36 m (30 ft 6 in – 30 ft 9 in)
- Draught: 3.41–3.76 m (11 ft 2 in – 12 ft 4 in) (deep load)
- Installed power: 5 Vulkan-Yarrow boilers; 23,000 shp (17,000 kW)
- Propulsion: 2 shafts, 2 steam turbines
- Speed: 30 knots (56 km/h; 35 mph)
- Range: 1,680 nmi (3,110 km; 1,930 mi) at 21 knots (39 km/h; 24 mph)
- Complement: 111
- Armament: 3 × single 102 mm (4 in) guns; 2 × single 7.62 mm (0.30 in) machine guns; 5 × twin 450 mm (17.7 in) torpedo tubes; 80 mines

Schastlivy (Russian: Счастливый) was a Derzky-class destroyer built for the Imperial Russian Navy during World War I. Completed in 1915, she served with the Black Sea Fleet.

== Design and description ==
In 1911, the Imperial Russian Navy conducted a design competition for destroyers to serve with the Black Sea Fleet based on the successful design of the Novik. The Navy selected the design submitted by the Putilov Shipyard, but only awarded a contract for one ship to Putilov. Contracts for two ships were given to St. Petersburg Metal Works and Nevsky Shipyard. All three of these shipyards were in Saint Petersburg and would have to assemble their ships on the Black Sea. The Navy awarded four destroyers to OSNiV in Mykolaiv, Ukraine, based on a promise of early delivery. It also allowed the company to alter the design as necessary.

Schastlivy was one of the Putilov-designed ships. They normally displaced 1,110 long tons (1,130 t) and 1,410–1,460 long tons (1,430–1,480 t) at full load. They measured 98 meters (321 ft 6 in) long overall with a beam of 9.3–9.36 meters (30 ft 6 in – 30 ft 9 in), and a draft of 3.41–3.76 meters (11 ft 2 in – 12 ft 4 in). The ships were propelled by two AEG-Curtis-Vulkan steam turbines, each driving one propeller shaft using steam from five Vulkan-Yarrow boilers. The turbines were designed to produce a total of 23,000 shaft horsepower (17,000 kW) for an intended maximum speed of 34 knots (63 km/h; 39 mph). On Schlastlivy's sea trials, she only reached 30.1 knots (55.7 km/h; 34.6 mph) from 24,000 shp (18,000 kW). The ships carried enough fuel oil to give them a range of 1,680 nautical miles (3,110 km; 1,930 mi) at 21 knots (39 km/h; 24 mph). Their crew numbered 111.

The main armament of the Dzerky-class ships did not vary between the two designs. It consisted of three single four-inch (102 mm) Pattern 1911 Obukhov guns and ten 450-millimeter (17.7 in) torpedo tubes in five twin mounts. One of these guns was mounted on the forecastle and a superfiring pair on the stern, aft of the torpedo tubes. All of the ships were initially fitted with two 7.62 mm (0.30 in) machine guns, with most ships receiving another pair of guns during the war. A pair of 47 mm (1.9 in) anti-aircraft (AA) guns were also added during the war. The ships could carry 80 M1912 naval mines. They were also fitted with a Barr and Stroud rangefinder and two 60-centimeter (24 in) searchlights.

== Construction and career ==
Schastlivy was built by the Putilov Shipyard and was assembled on the leased Vaddon shipyard in Kherson. Completed in 1915, she was assigned to the Black Sea Fleet. Her crew joined the Bolsheviks in December 1917 and helped to establish Bolshevik control over the Crimea in January 1918.

== Bibliography ==
- Apalkov, Yu. V. (1996). Боевые корабли русского флота: 8.1914-10.1917г [Combat Ships of the Russian Fleet: 8.1914-10.1917] (in Russian). Saint Petersburg, Russia: ИНТЕК. ISBN 5-7559-0018-3.
- Berezhnoy, S. S. (2002). Крейсера и Миносцы: Справочик [Cruisers and Destroyers: Reference] (in Russian). Moscow: Ввоенное Ииздательство. ISBN 5-203-01780-8.
- Breyer, Siegfried (1992). Soviet Warship Development: Volume 1: 1917–1937. London: Conway Maritime Press. ISBN 0-85177-604-3.
- Budzbon, Przemysław (2026). "The High-Speed Destroyers of the Novik Type: Part I". In Jordan, John (ed.). Warship 2026. Osprey Publishing. pp. 8–29. ISBN 978-1-4728-7259-3.
- Budzbon, Przemysław (1985). "Russia". In Gray, Randal (ed.). Conway's All the World's Fighting Ships 1906–1921. Annapolis, Maryland: Naval Institute Press. pp. 291–325. ISBN 0-85177-245-5.
- Budzbon, Przemysław; Radziemski, Jan & Twardowski, Marek (2022). Warships of the Soviet Fleets 1939–1945. Vol. I: Major Combatants. Annapolis, Maryland: Naval Institute Press. ISBN 978-1-68247-877-6.
- Chernyshev, Alexander (2007). "Новики": Лучшие эсминцы российского императосого флота ["Noviki": The Best Destroyers of the Imperial Russian Navy] (in Russian). Moscow: Эксмо. ISBN 978-5-699-23164-5.
- Verstyuk, Anatoly & Gordeyev, Stanislav (2006). Корабли Минных дивизий. От "Новика" до "Гогланда" [Torpedo Division Ships: From Novik to Gogland] (in Russian). Moscow: Voennaya Kniga. ISBN 5-902863-10-4.
- Watts, Anthony J. (1990). The Imperial Russian Navy. London: Arms and Armour. ISBN 0-85368-912-1.
