= SOLIDAC =

- Also known as: Solid-state Automatic Computer
- Manufacturer: Barr & Stroud
- Released: 1959
- Discontinued: 1963
- Units shipped: 1
- CPU: Transistor-based
- Memory: 1,024 words, 20 bits each

The SOLIDAC (Solid-state Automatic Computer) was a 50 kHz mini-computer at Glasgow University, built by Barr & Stroud in the late 1950s; Some early computer music was created on the system.

The machine is currently housed in the National Museums Scotland Collection Centre in Granton, Edinburgh.
