= Derzky-class destroyer =

Imperial Russian destroyers

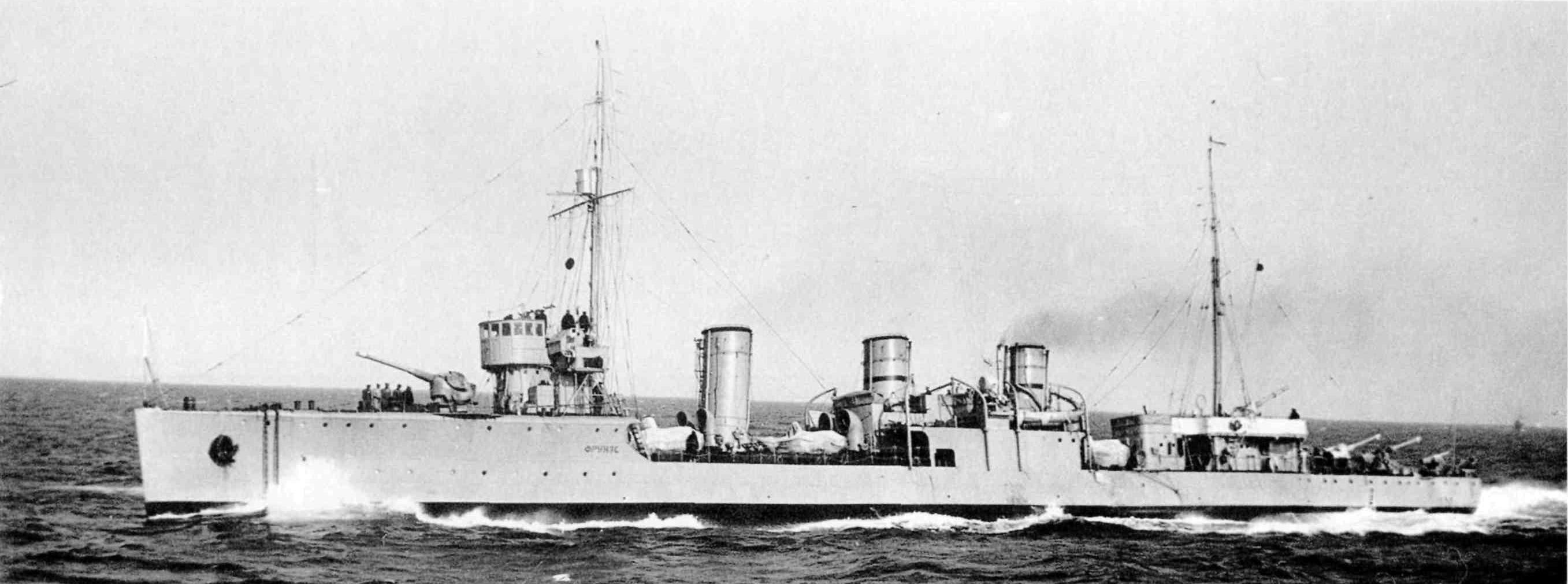
- Frunze

Class overview
- Operators: Imperial Russian Navy; Soviet Navy
- Preceded by: Novik
- Succeeded by: Orfey class
- In commission: 1913–1941
- Completed: 9
- Lost: 3

General characteristics
- Type: Destroyer
- Displacement: 1,100 long tons (1,118 t) (standard); 1,320 long tons (1,341 t) (full load)
- Length: 98 m (321 ft 6 in)
- Beam: 9.3 m (30 ft 6 in)
- Draught: 3.2 m (10 ft 6 in)
- Installed power: 5 Thornycroft boilers; 25,500 shp (19,000 kW)
- Propulsion: 2 shafts; 2 steam turbines
- Speed: 34 knots (63 km/h; 39 mph)
- Range: 1,717 nmi (3,180 km; 1,976 mi) at 21 knots (39 km/h; 24 mph)
- Complement: 125
- Armament: 3 × single 102 mm (4 in) guns; 2 × 47 mm (1.9 in) AA guns; 2 × 7.62 mm (0.300 in) machine guns; 5 × twin 450 mm (17.7 in) torpedo tubes; 80 mines

The Derzky or Bespokoiny-class destroyers was a class of destroyers built for the Imperial Russian Navy just before World War I. Nine ships were built for the Black Sea Fleet. These ships were a derivative of the Novik, but were slightly smaller.

Similar to the earlier Novik, the Derzky class used steam turbines powered by oil-fired boilers, enabling speeds of approximately 34 knots (63 km/h; 39 mph). The class carried a comparatively heavy torpedo armament for vessels of its size, effective for its intended role in patrol, escort, and torpedo attack operations in the Black Sea during World War I. Although more lightly armed than other destroyers of the time, the ships’ speed and maneuverability made them well suited for coastal operations and fleet support duties.

== Ships ==
Ship	Builder	Launched	Fate
Bespokoiny (Turbulent)	Nikolayev Navy Yard	31 October 1913	Interned in Bizerte with Wrangel's fleet and scrapped 1924
Derzky (Impertinent)	Nikolayev Navy Yard	15 March 1914	Interned in Bizerte and scrapped 1924
Gnevny (Furious)	Nikolayev Navy Yard	31 October 1913	Interned in Bizerte and scrapped 1924
Pronzitelny (Shrill)	Nikolayev Navy Yard	15 March 1914	Scuttled 18 June 1918 near Novorosiysk
Bystry (Rapid) - renamed Frunze	Metal works, Kherson	7 June 1914	Scuttled to avoid capture in 1919 and raised and repaired by the Soviet Navy. Sunk by Stuka dive bombers on 21 September 1941
Gromki (Loud)	Metal works, Kherson	18 December 1913	Scuttled 18 June 1918 near Novorosiysk
Pospeshny (Hasty)	Nikolayev Navy Yard	4 April 1914	Interned in Bizerte and scrapped 1924
Pylki (Ardent)	Metal works, Kherson	28 July 1914	Interned in Bizerte and scrapped 1924
Schastlivy (Happy)	Putilov Yard (Nikolayev)	29 March 1914	Grounded 24 October 1919 while being towed to internment

== Bibliography ==
- Apalkov, Yu. V. (1996). Боевые корабли русского флота: 8.1914-10.1917г [Combat Ships of the Russian Fleet: 8.1914-10.1917] (in Russian). ИНТЕК. ISBN 5-7559-0018-3.
- Berezhnoy, S. S. (2002). Крейсера и Миносцы: Справочик [Cruisers and Destroyers: Reference] (in Russian). Ввоенное Ииздательство. ISBN 5-203-01780-8.
- Breyer, Siegfried (1992). Soviet Warship Development: Volume 1: 1917–1937. Conway Maritime Press. ISBN 0-85177-604-3.
- Budzbon, Przemysław (2026). "The High-Speed Destroyers of the Novik Type: Part I". In Jordan, John (ed.). Warship 2026. Osprey Publishing. pp. 8–29. ISBN 978-1-4728-7259-3.
- Budzbon, Przemysław (1985). "Russia". In Gray, Randal (ed.). Conway's All the World's Fighting Ships 1906–1921. Naval Institute Press. pp. 291–325. ISBN 0-85177-245-5.
- Budzbon, Przemysław (1980). "Soviet Union". In Chesneau, Roger (ed.). Conway's All the World's Fighting Ships 1922–1946. Conway Maritime Press. pp. 318–346. ISBN 0-85177-146-7.
- Budzbon, Przemysław; Radziemski, Jan & Twardowski, Marek (2022). Warships of the Soviet Fleets 1939–1945. Vol. I: Major Combatants. Naval Institute Press. ISBN 978-1-68247-877-6.
- Campbell, John (1985). Naval Weapons of World War II. Naval Institute Press. ISBN 0-87021-459-4.
- Chernyshev, Alexander (2007). "Новики": Лучшие эсминцы российского императосого флота ["Noviki": The Best Destroyers of the Imperial Russian Navy] (in Russian). Эксмо. ISBN 978-5-699-23164-5.
- Friedman, Norman (2011). Naval Weapons of World War One: Guns, Torpedoes, Mines and ASW Weapons of All Nations; An Illustrated Directory. Seaforth Publishing. ISBN 978-1-84832-100-7.
- Hill, Alexander (2018). Soviet Destroyers of World War II. New Vanguard. Vol. 256. Osprey Publishing. ISBN 978-1-4728-2256-7.
- Rohwer, Jürgen (2005). Chronology of the War at Sea 1939–1945: The Naval History of World War Two (Third Revised ed.). Naval Institute Press. ISBN 1-59114-119-2.
- Verstyuk, Anatoly & Gordeyev, Stanislav (2006). Корабли Минных дивизий. От "Новика" до "Гогланда" [Torpedo Division Ships: From Novik to Gogland] (in Russian). Voennaya Kniga. ISBN 5-902863-10-4.
- Zubkov, Dmitry (2025). Soviet and Russians Destroyer Exports. Vol. 1: Imperial Russian-Built Destroyers in Service with Foreign Navies, 1904–1954. Helion. ISBN 978-1-804515-58-7.
