= Barr and Stroud =

Glasgow optical engineering firm

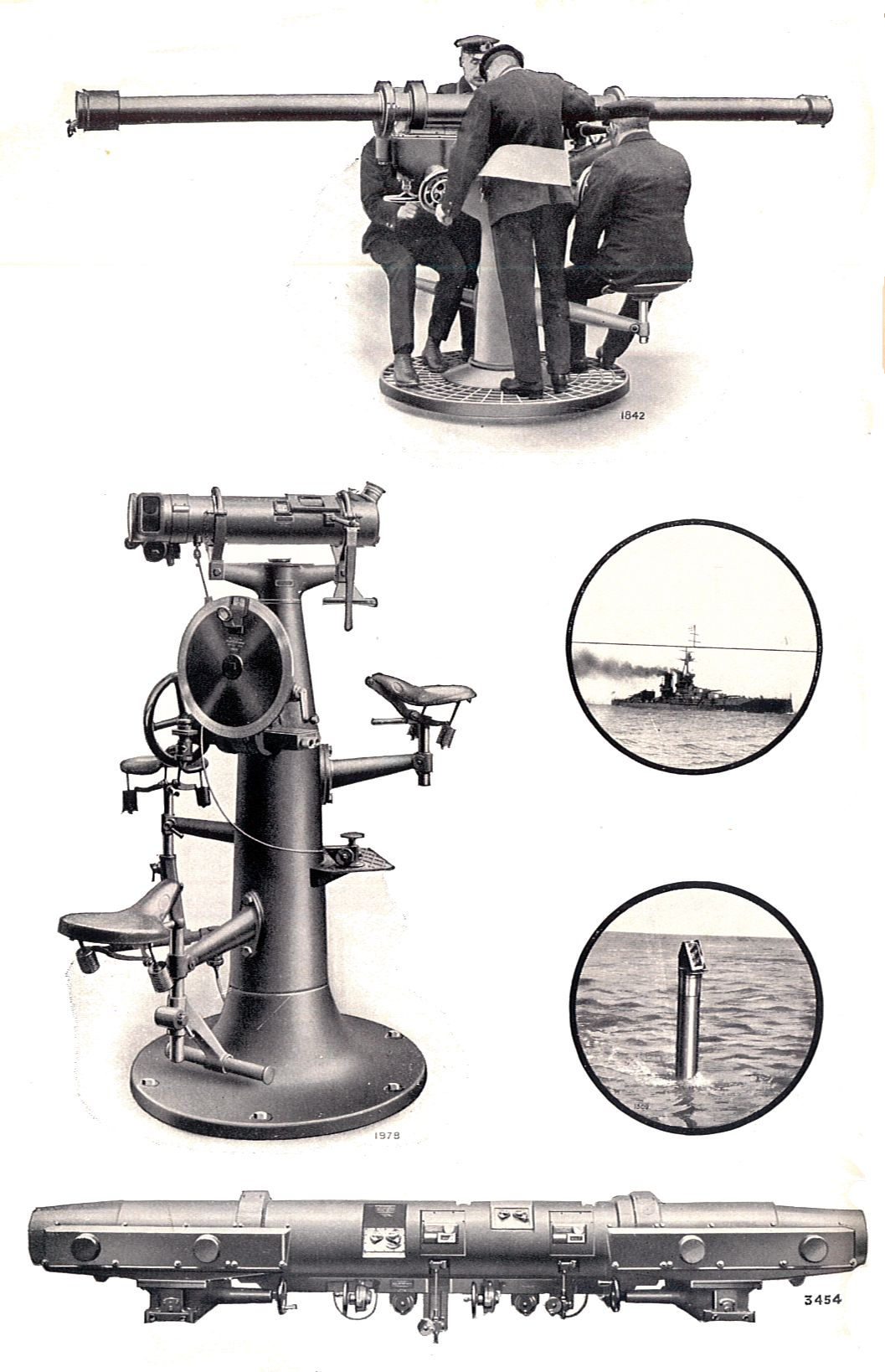
Naval range-finding instruments of 1936

Barr & Stroud Limited was a pioneering Glasgow optical engineering firm. They played a leading role in developing modern optics, including rangefinders, for the Royal Navy and other branches of British Armed Forces during the 20th century. There was a non-military arm of the company which made medical equipment, like photocoagulators and electronic filters, some of which were used by the BBC. The company and its intellectual property passed through Pilkington group to Thales Optronics. The Barr and Stroud name was sold to an importer of optical equipment (Optical Vision Ltd), who used the trademarked name for a line of binoculars and similar instruments.

== History ==
Archibald Barr and William Stroud had been associated from as early as 1888 when the two men were professors of, respectively, engineering and physics at the Yorkshire College (now the University of Leeds). In 1891, they were approached by the Admiralty to submit a design for a short-base rangefinder for trial. By this time, Barr had returned to Scotland and taken the Regius Professor of Civil Engineering and Mechanics post at the University of Glasgow. Although apart, Barr and Stroud kept in close touch and in 1892 they were awarded with a contract for six of their rangefinders.

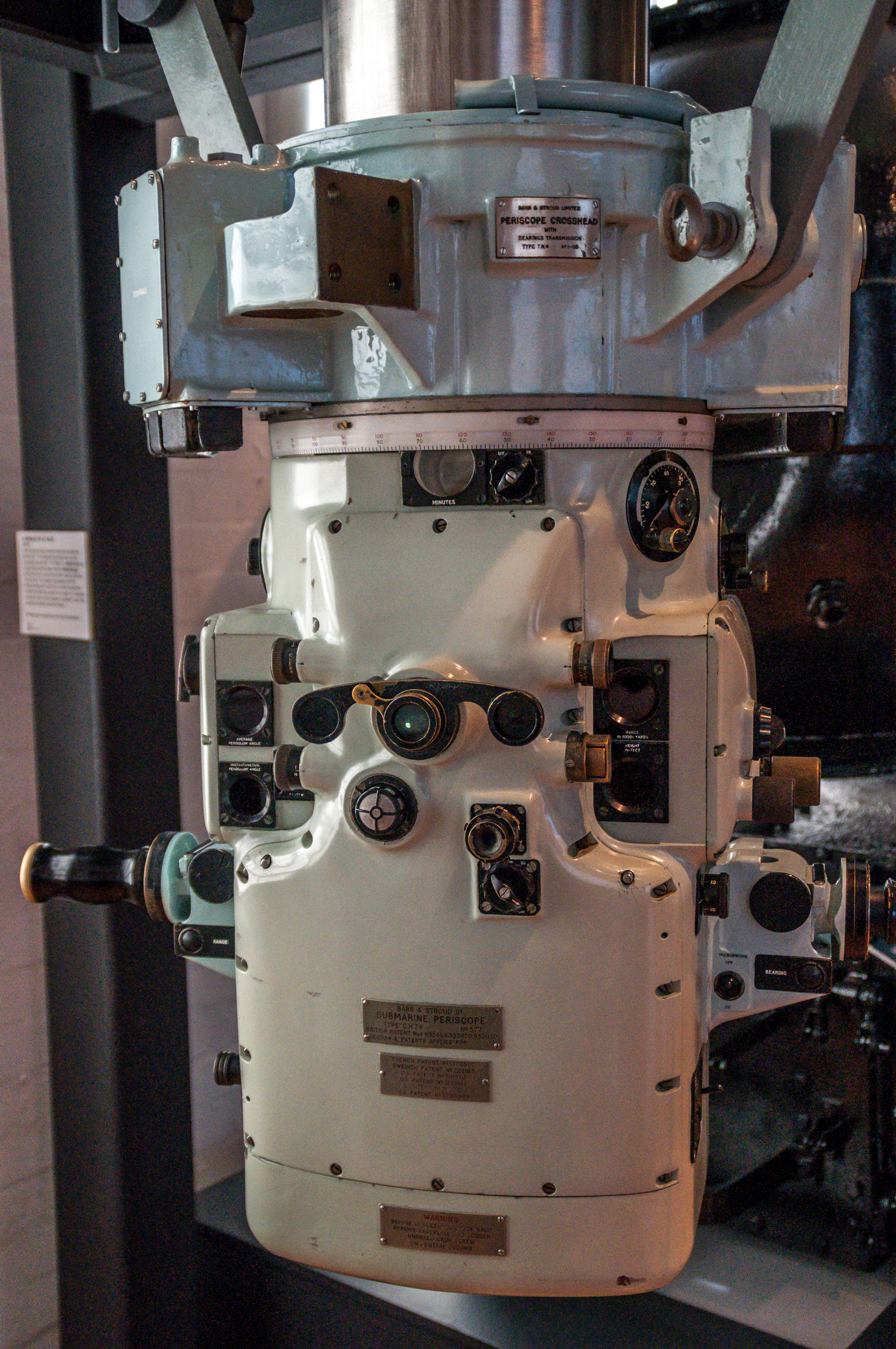
Barr and Stroud Attack Periscope Type CH74 - RAN Oberon-class submarine

In 1895, Barr & Stroud's Patents Ltd was renting workshop space near the university, at 250 Byres Road, Glasgow, but demand for the product soon necessitated a move to larger premises in Ashton Lane, Glasgow. By 1904, 100 men were working for the company in a new purpose-built factory in Anniesland, Glasgow designed by Campbell Douglas. Shortly thereafter, in 1909, Stroud resigned his chair at the University of Leeds and moved to Glasgow to work for the company full-time. Barr, in spite of a distinguished teaching career at Glasgow University, followed his example in 1913. Together they formed Barr & Stroud Ltd. that year.

In 1914, they began extensions to the Anniesland works in order to meet the sharp increase in demand for their rangefinders that followed on the outbreak of the First World War. The war years saw the development of other products, including a torpedo depth recorder, a periscope rangefinder, fire-control systems and a dome sight for aircraft. During World War I there was a problem with the supply of binoculars to the armed forces and apart from the British makers, binoculars were bought in from various sources. So it was only natural that the military would be looking to rectify this problem. At the time Zeiss was probably the leading makers and the military thought this may cause a problem in the future. Barr & Stroud, this book published on the occasion of centenary of the Barr & Stroud has a picture showing these two professors in the roof of Royston the residence of Professor Archibald Barr in Glasgow testing their production and invention. Royston is now called 10 Crown Road North Glasgow G12 9DH. Archibald Barr's family later gifted Royston to Glasgow University and it has since been the residence of Professor John Lamb of the Engineering School and later of Professor Sayed Hassan Amin.

It was c.1919 when the company started producing their first binoculars which were supplied to the British Navy and from then on the company continued to operate independently until c.1977 when they were taken over by the Pilkington Group. In 1992 operations moved from the original factory in Anniesland to a new plant in Lint house on the site of the former Alexander Stephen and Sons shipyard. In 2000 the company became a subsidiary of the French company, Thales Group, and in 2001 Barr & Stroud Ltd became Thales Optronics Ltd.

The Barr and Stroud brand name was then bought by Eastleigh-based Optical Distribution Services Ltd, who re-registered as Barr and Stroud Ltd in 2008. The new company has developed a new range of binoculars and telescopes. The new range of Barr & Stroud binoculars are currently made in China (Nov. 2011) and distributed by Optical Vision Ltd and have no connection whatsoever with Barr & Stroud Ltd of Glasgow.

== Aircraft Gunsights ==
In 1926 Barr & Stroud produced the prototype GD1 reflector gunsight for aircraft based on a 1900 patent awarded to Sir Howard Grubb. The sight was extensively redesigned and issued to the Royal Air Force as the GD2B in 1927. By 1934 the sight had developed into the GD5 and again into the GD12. By 1938 the GM2 Mk II was patented in 1937 and was introduced into front line fighters starting in 1938 in time for the Battle of Britain. Demand was so great that Barr and Stroud subcontracted 700 units to Herr Neumann of Goerz in Austria. Despite the Anschluss between Germany and Austria - Neumann delivered the last of the contract just as war broke out in 1939. The sight saw continuous development through the war. The GN2 allowed for the extra drop of relatively slow underwing rockets. More than 84,000 variants of the GM2 were produced during the war. The sights were superseded during the war by Ferranti's GGC gyro gunsight which calculated and displayed the "lead" required for a successful deflection shot. Bar and Stroud manufactured the optical portions of the Ferranti sight.

Parallel work on sights for free and turret mounted guns produced the J1 through GJ3 in various marks.

== Engines ==
In the 1920s Barr & Stroud Ltd started offering sleeve valve motorcycle engines based on a design by Peter Burt and L.J. McCollum. In a half-page advert in Motor Cycle magazine in 1922 they encouraged readers to contact them at Anniesland, Glasgow, for more information, or contact the manufacturers currently offering their 350cc single cylinder engine, naming Beardmore-Precision, Royal Scot, Edmund and Diamond motorcycles. In 1923 a new motorcycle manufacturer, Grindlay-Peerless offered a 999cc V-twin Barr & Stroud engined motorcycle, later adding a 500cc and 350cc single. They also offered J.A.P. engines, and it appears the racing success of the J.A.P. engines made them the preferred choice, and so the sleeve valve engines were dropped in 1927.

== Computers ==
Barr and Stroud constructed the first computer to be built in Scotland, the pioneering SOLIDAC minicomputer for the University of Glasgow, assembled between 1958 and 1963 as an attempt to expand into electronics.

== Notes ==
9. Barr & Stroud, this book published on the occasion of centenary of the Barr & Stroud has a picture showing these two professors in the roof of Royston the residence of Professor Archibald Barr in Glasgow testing their production and invention. Royston is now called 10 Crown Road North Glasgow G12 9DH
