= Russian cruiser Kagul =

Russian cruiser Kagul may refer to:

- Russian cruiser Ochakov (1902) (renamed to Kagul in 1907)
- A former name of Soviet cruiser Komintern (until 1907)
