= China Railways LD1 =

China Railways LD1 Mantetsu Dabusa class (ダブサ)
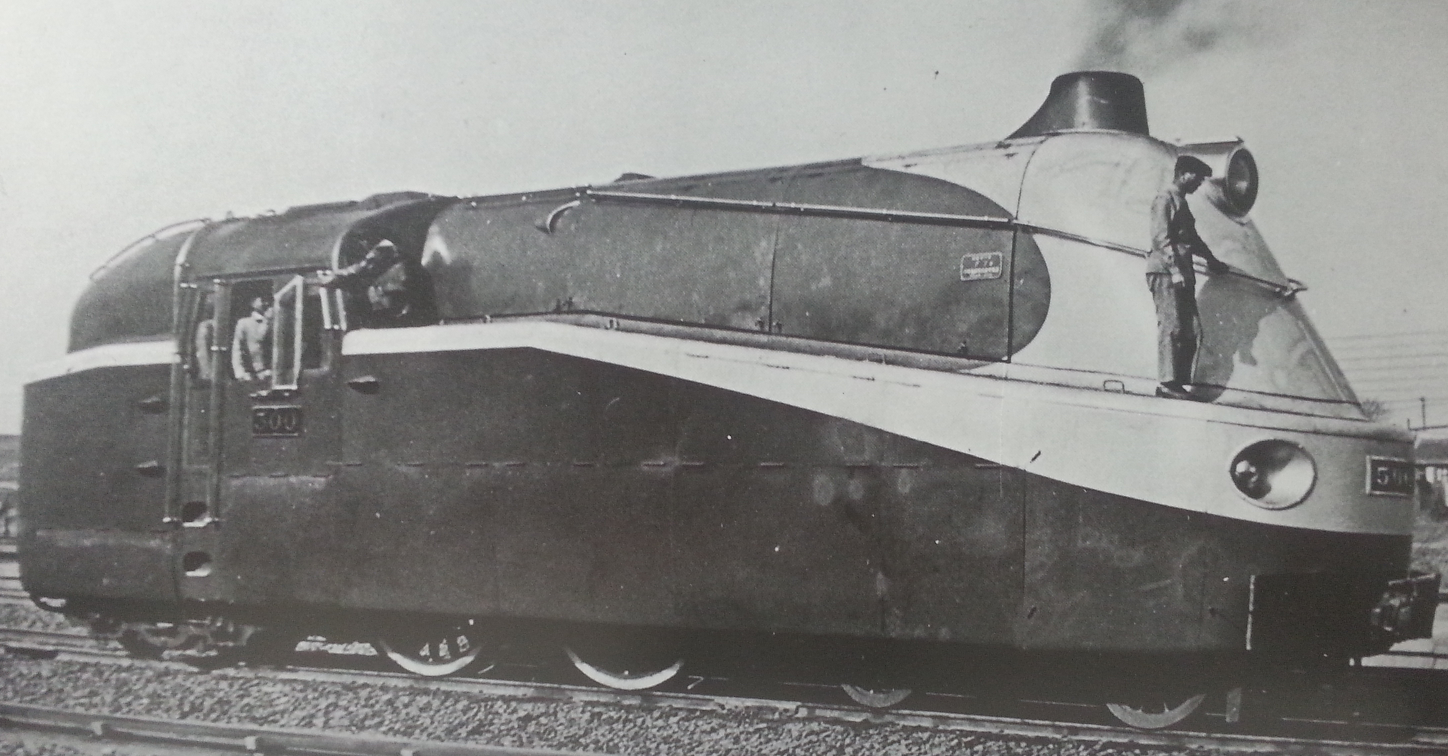
- South Manchuria Railway ダブサ500
Type and origin
- Power type: Steam
- Builder: Kawasaki
- Build date: 1936
- Total produced: 2
Specifications
- Configuration
  - Whyte: 4-4-4T
- Gauge: 1,435 mm (4 ft 8 1/2 in)
- Driver dia.: 2,000 mm (79 in)
- Length: 14,639 mm (576.3 in)
- Width: 3,302 mm (130.0 in)
- Height: 4,600 mm (180 in)
- Adhesive weight: 40.44 t (39.80 long tons)
- Loco weight: 99.89 t (98.31 long tons)
- Fuel type: Coal
- Fuel capacity: 6.5 t (6.4 long tons)
- Water cap.: 15.50 m^{3} (547 cu ft)
- Firebox
  - Grate area: 2.28 m^{2} (24.5 sq ft)
- Boiler
  - Small tubes: 30 x 51 mm (2.0 in)
  - Large tubes: 66 x 90 mm (3.5 in)
- Boiler pressure: 15.5 kgf/cm^{2} (220 psi)
- Heating surface
  - Firebox: 11.25 m^{2} (121.1 sq ft)
  - Tubes: 89.16 m^{2} (959.7 sq ft)
  - Total surface: 141.25 m^{2} (1,520.4 sq ft)
- Superheater
  - Type: Schmidt type E
  - Heating area: 40.84 m^{2} (439.6 sq ft)
- Cylinders: Two, outside
- Cylinder size: 470 mm × 600 mm (19 in × 24 in)
- Valve gear: Walschaerts
Performance figures
- Tractive effort: 85.6 kN (19,200 lb_{f})
Career
- Operators: South Manchuria Railway; China Railway
- Class: SMR: ダブサ; CR: ㄌㄉ一 (1951–1959); CR: LD1 (1959–end)
- Number in class: 17
- Numbers: SMR: ダブサ500–501 (1936–1938); SMR: ダブサ1–2 (1938–1945); CR: ?
- Disposition: All scrapped

The China Railways LD1 class steam locomotive was a class of streamlined 4-4-4T tank steam locomotives for passenger trains operated by the China Railway. They were originally built for the South Manchuria Railway (Mantetsu) in 1936. The "Dabu" name came from the English "double-ender", which was used by Mantetsu for all tank locomotives.

== History ==
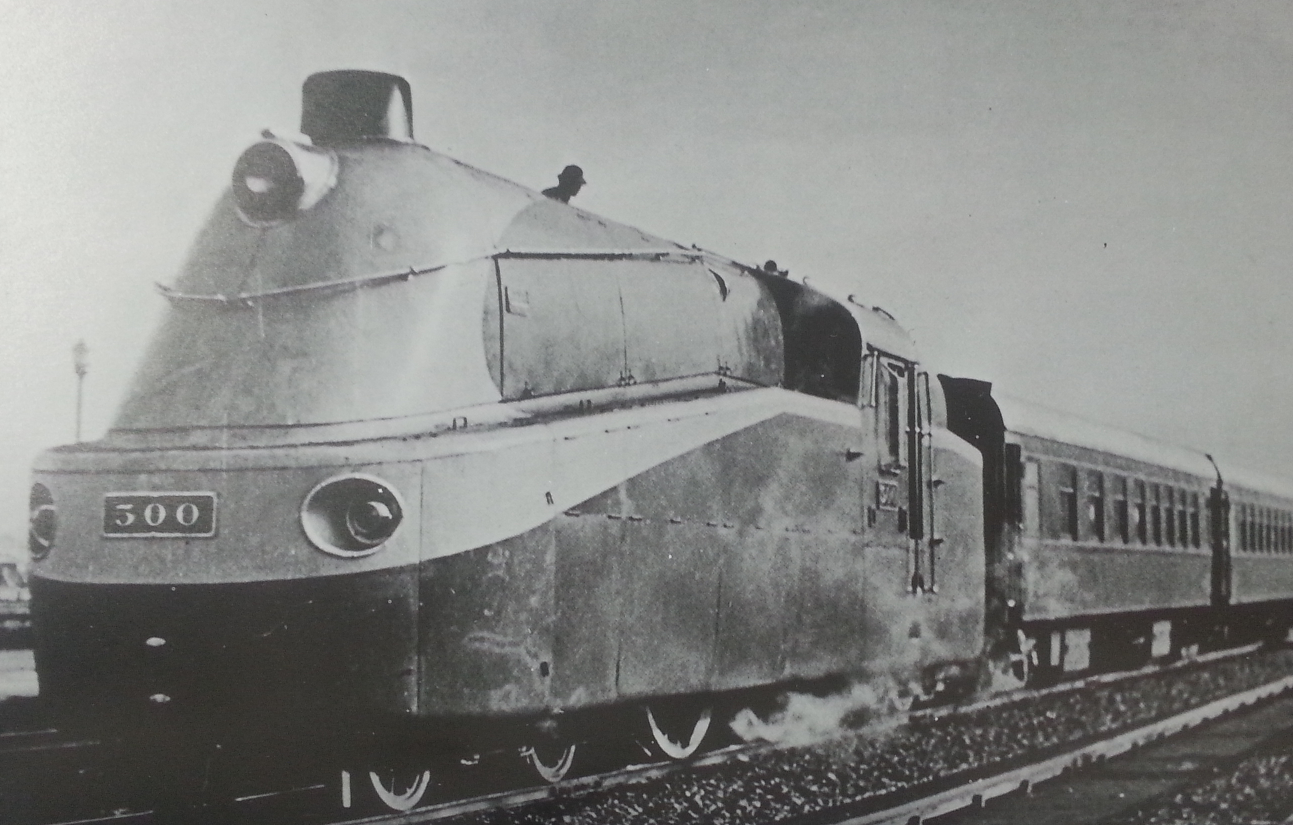
South Manchuria Railway locomotive ダブサ500 on a passenger train.

After the failure of the 500 hp (370 kW) power car of the Jiha1 class 4-part diesel-electric trainset in 1935, Mantetsu decided to build a locomotive for high-speed, short-distance trains. The result was the Dabusa (ダブサ) class 4-4-4T locomotives, though they were originally designed with a 4-4-6T wheel arrangement.

Mantetsu intended to build steam locomotives for high speed passenger trains in the future, and to be competitive with the high speeds attained by diesel trainsets, they needed to be safely operated continuously over long distances. To this end, all bearings were roller bearings from SKF of Sweden to reduce fuel consumption, and the locomotive was designed to make inspection and maintenance as simple as possible, and to maximise the time between maintenance intervals. In addition, the introduction of technically advanced steam locomotives to replace internal-combustion railcars also took into consideration the potential for petroleum shortages in case of war. The streamlining was designed in cooperation with the Kawanishi Aircraft Company at the same time as the streamlining for the Pashina class locomotive Pashina-12 was designed.

Two were built as a trial production in 1936, using special steel to reduce weight as much as possible. A Schmidt type E superheater and a feedwater heater were fitted. Though normally operating on coal, a heavy oil combustion device was fitted to allow the use of shale oil as fuel. However, when tests with shale oil from the Fushun Coal Mine were conducted, it was found that the temperature in the firebox rose too high, causing a failure, and the idea was abandoned. As they proved less successful than hoped, they ended up being used mainly on ordinary passenger trains on the Dalian–Wafangdian and Dashiqiao–Fengtian sections of Mantetsu's Dalian–Xinjing mainline.

Similar in physical appearance to the Class 242 streamlined 4-4-4T tank locomotives of the Hungarian State Railways, they were painted in a purple and cream livery inspired by the German Class 61 streamlined tank locomotives.

Originally numbered ダブサ500 and ダブサ501, under the new unified classification system introduced in 1938, they became ダブサ1 and ダブサ2.

Owner	Class & numbers (1936–1938)	Class & numbers (1938–1945)	Builder	Year
Mantetsu	ダブサ500, ダブサ501	ダブサ1, ダブサ2	Kawasaki	1936

== Postwar ==
At the end of the Second Sino-Japanese War, one was assigned to the Dalian depot, while the second was assigned to the Fengtian Railway Bureau; both were passed on to the Republic of China Railway. After the establishment of the People's Republic and the current China Railway, they were designated class ㄌㄉ1 (LD1) in 1951, And Retired 1955.

== See also ==
- DRG Class 61 and LBE Nos. 1 to 3 German streamlined tank locomotives, of similar age and purpose.
- Hungarian MÁV Class 242
