= MÁV Class 242 =

Class of 4 Hungarian 4-4-4T locomotives

MÁV class 242
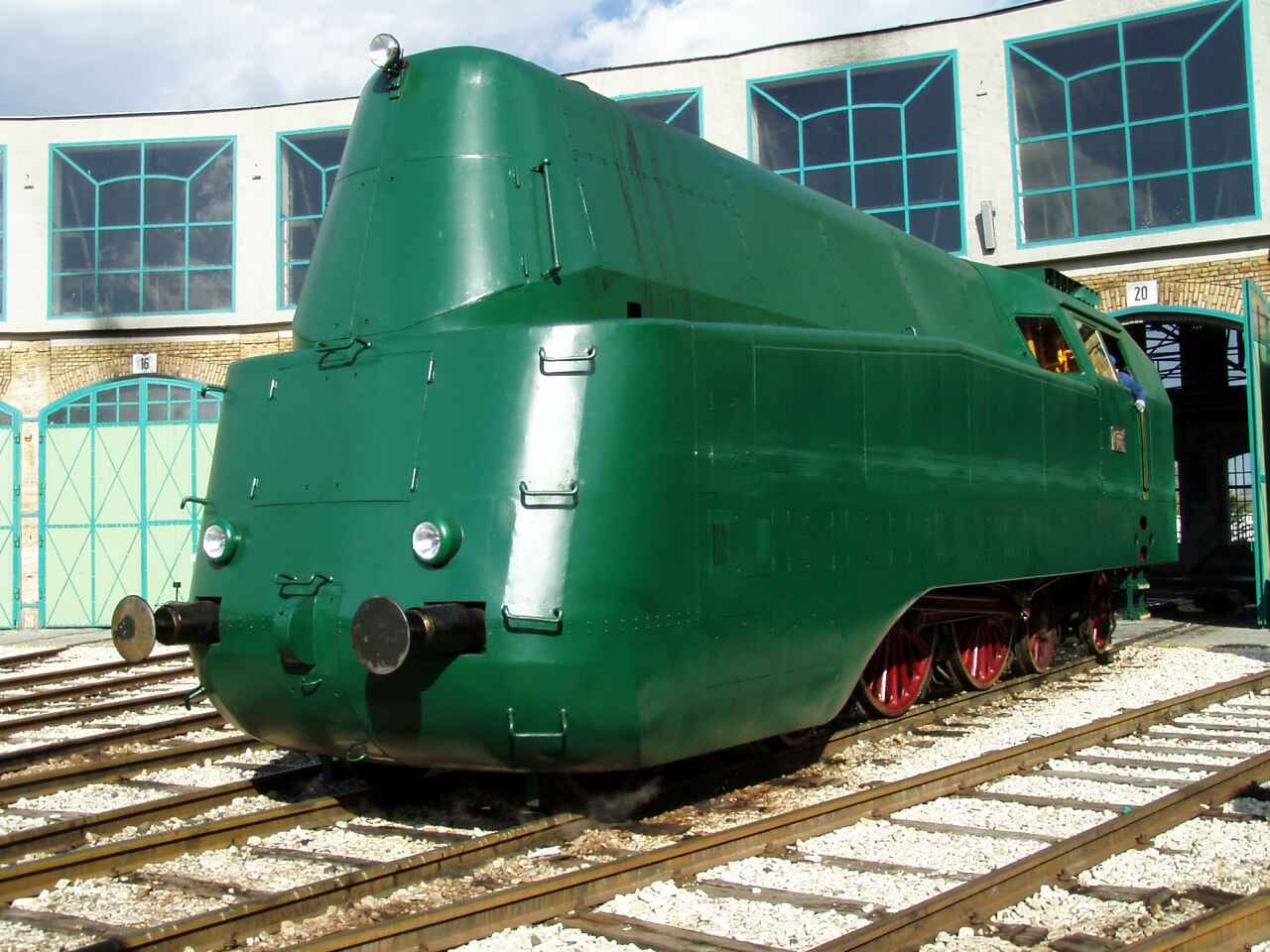
- 242.001, restored at the Hungarian Railway Museum
Type and origin
- Power type: Steam
- Builder: MÁVAG, Budapest
- Order number: 129th
- Build date: 1936–1939
- Total produced: 4
Specifications
- Configuration
  - Whyte: 4-4-4T
  - UIC: 2′B2′ h2St
- Gauge: 1,435 mm (4 ft 8 1/2 in)
- Driver dia.: 200 centimetres (6 ft 7 in)
- Wheelbase: 10.58 metres (34 ft 9 in)
  - Axle spacing (Asymmetrical): 2.185 metres (7 ft 2.0 in)
- Length: 14.275 metres (46 ft 10.0 in)
- Height: 4.303 metres (14.12 ft)
- Axle load: 14.6 tonnes (14.4 long tons; 16.1 short tons)
- Adhesive weight: 29.2 tonnes (28.7 long tons; 32.2 short tons)
- Loco weight: 85.4 tonnes (84.1 long tons; 94.1 short tons)
- Fuel type: coal
- Fuel capacity: 4.9 tonnes (4.8 long tons; 5.4 short tons)
- Water cap.: 10,000 litres (2,200 imp gal)
- Firebox
  - Grate area: 2.75 square metres (29.6 sq ft)
- Boiler pressure: 18 standard atmospheres (260 psi)
- Heating surface
  - Firebox: 12.4 square metres (133 sq ft)
  - Total surface: 155.4 square metres (1,673 sq ft)
- Superheater
  - Type: Schmidt
  - Heating area: 35.2 square metres (379 sq ft)
- Cylinders: 2
- Cylinder size: 430 mm × 650 mm (16.93 in × 25.59 in)
- Valve gear: Heusinger
- Train brakes: Knorr compressed-air
Performance figures
- Maximum speed: 120 kilometres per hour (75 mph) (service); 152 kilometres per hour (94 mph) (in tests); 161 kilometres per hour (100 mph) (Hungarian speed record in 1961)
Career
- Operators: MÁV
- Class: 242
- Nicknames: Coffin
- Retired: 1961

MÁV Class 242 was a 4-4-4T steam locomotive of Hungarian State Railways. A small class of only four examples, they were built between 1936 and 1939. They were highly unusual in that they were streamlined tank locomotives.

== Design ==
Hungarian railways after World War I were in a poor state. Together with the Great Depression of the late 1920s and early 1930s, they had lagged behind developments in other countries. By the mid-1930s though, there was a demand for a faster express service. The Hungarian demand was for an express locomotive that would be fast, with a design speed of up to 120 kilometres per hour (75 mph), but owing to the state of the track and also because the running distance and the train weights of 4-5 coach trains were relatively low, it would yet be possible for it to be small and lightweight. Following the fashion of the day, the locomotive was to be streamlined.

The symmetrical wheel arrangement of 4-4-4T, particularly with the use of a tank locomotive rather than a tender, was chosen to allow high-speed running in either direction, without the need to reverse the locomotive on a turntable. This was following the earlier practice of 2-4-2T of around 1900 for suburban passenger services, although with their pony trucks replaced by bogies to allow faster running. For the express locomotives of the 1930s though, like the similar DRG Class 61, the intention was to reduce turn-around time at stations, rather than for use at small stations without turntables.

The use of four-coupled wheels for a fast express was unusual by this time, as the Atlantic arrangement, a four-coupled tender locomotive with a four-wheel leading bogie for high-speeds, had by now largely been replaced by the larger Pacific. One exception was the US Hiawatha, a 4-4-2 of the same period. US track loadings were higher though, and this locomotive had a driving axle loading twice that of the Hungarian design. With the relatively short range of 250 kilometres (160 mi) required, the Class 242 could afford to be a tank locomotive, even though this reduced the water and fuel capacity available. Avoiding the weight of a tender, and a large fuel capacity, further reduced the axle loading. A modern feature required by these increased speeds, and the lack of braking weight in the locomotive itself, was improved continuous braking throughout the train, by compressed air brakes to the Knorr system.

As was typical Hungarian practice, the first two locomotives were built with steel fireboxes. To cope with the high ash production of Eastern European coal, a rocking grate was fitted. The later two locomotives were fitted with copper fireboxes, owing to cracking problems with the steel. The class was considered successful, although the shadow of World War II meant that no further examples were built, even though Hungary did not enter the war until 1941.

== Streamlining ==
As with the LNER Class A4, the class retained its overall streamlining throughout service, but the lower valances were later cut higher to improve access to the running gear for maintenance.

== Service ==
The locomotives were successful on delivery and performed well. Their 120 km/h (75 mph) design speed was easily achieved, 20–30 km/h (12–19 mph) faster than other trains then in service. On test they even reached 160 km/h (99 mph). Their ride quality was particularly noted, being smooth and stable at high speeds in both directions.

In tests over the high-speed running lines of the Berlin–Hamburg Railway, also used for the Flying Hamburger service, they achieved 152 kilometres per hour (94 mph).

Their main service was from Budapest and also the short Miskolc-Kassa (Note: Before 1920, and between 1938 and 1947, it was part of Hungary, now it is the second biggest city of Slovakia with the official name of Košice.) line, which was short enough to be within the range of their coal capacity. In later years they were double-headed to haul the heavy Orient Express on the section from Budapest to Biharkeresztes.

In 1961, 242.002 was used to test new rolling stock and set a speed record for Hungarian steam traction of 161 kilometres per hour (100 mph).

== Preservation ==
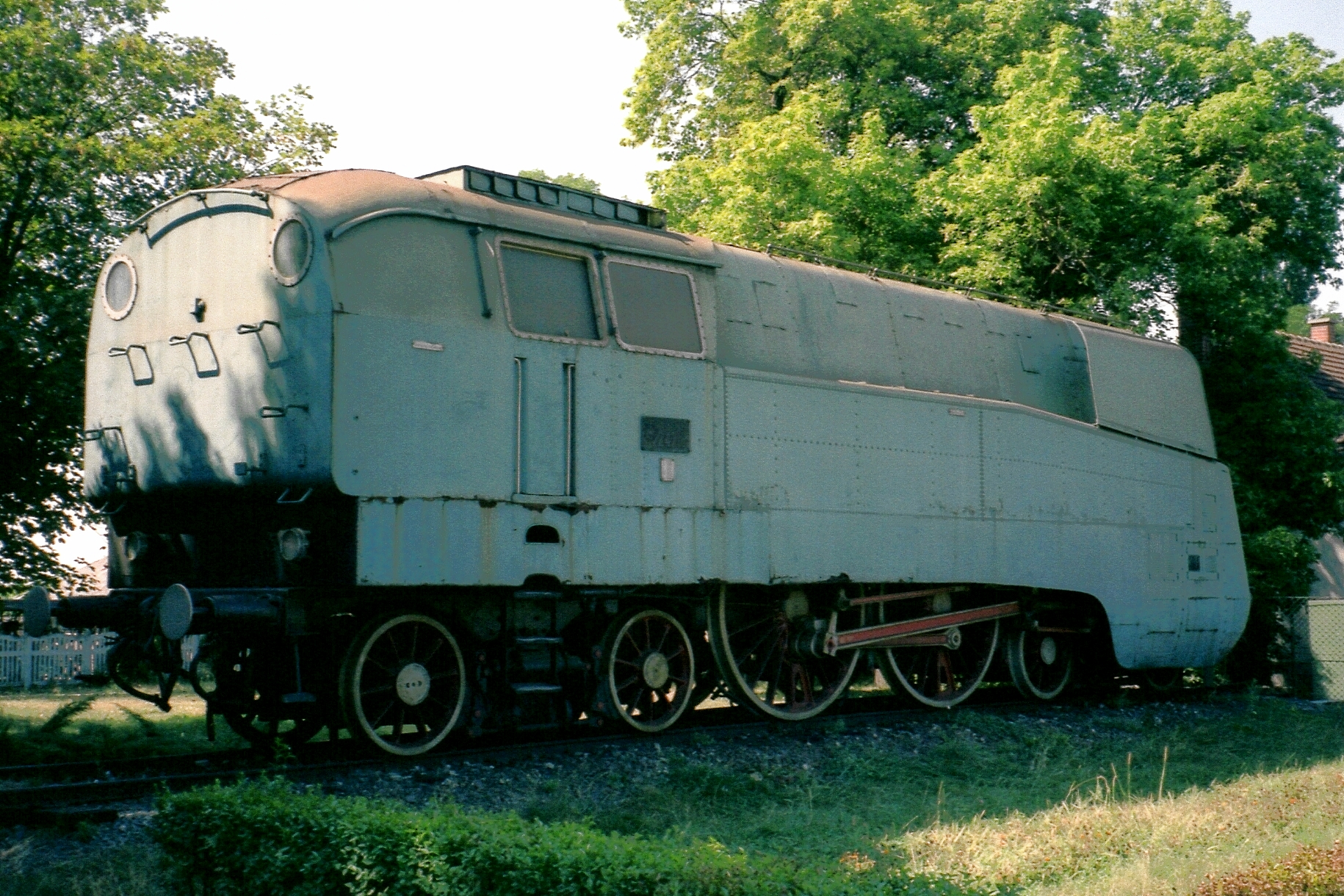
242.001 as a static exhibit in a park in 1995

One example, 242.001, survives. After static exhibition in a park for some years it was restored to running order in 2002 as part of the Hungarian Railway Museum and is in use for enthusiast special trains.

== Comparable locomotives ==
- DRG Class 61 and LBE Nos. 1 to 3 German streamlined tank locomotives, of similar age and purpose.
- Milwaukee Road class A Hiawatha An American four-coupled Atlantic of similar age, but far greater weight and axle loading.
- Aamot (railcar) The first Hungarian high-speed diesel railcar
- LD1 for the Chinese South Manchuria Railway of 1936
