= LBE =

LBE could refer to:

== Places ==
- The London Borough of Ealing, England
- The London Borough of Enfield, England
- Arnold Palmer Regional Airport, Pennsylvania, US

== Military ==
- Pratt-Read LBE, a WWII glide bomb prototype
- Landing Barge, Emergency repair, a WWII ship type

== Other uses ==
- Lead-bismuth eutectic, an alloy
- Location-based entertainment
- Lübeck-Büchen Railway Company (German: Lübeck-Büchener Eisenbahn)
  - LBE Nos. 1 to 3
- Lak language, spoken in Russia (ISO 639-3:LBE)
