= DRG Class 61 =

Class of 1+1 German locomotives

DRG 61 001
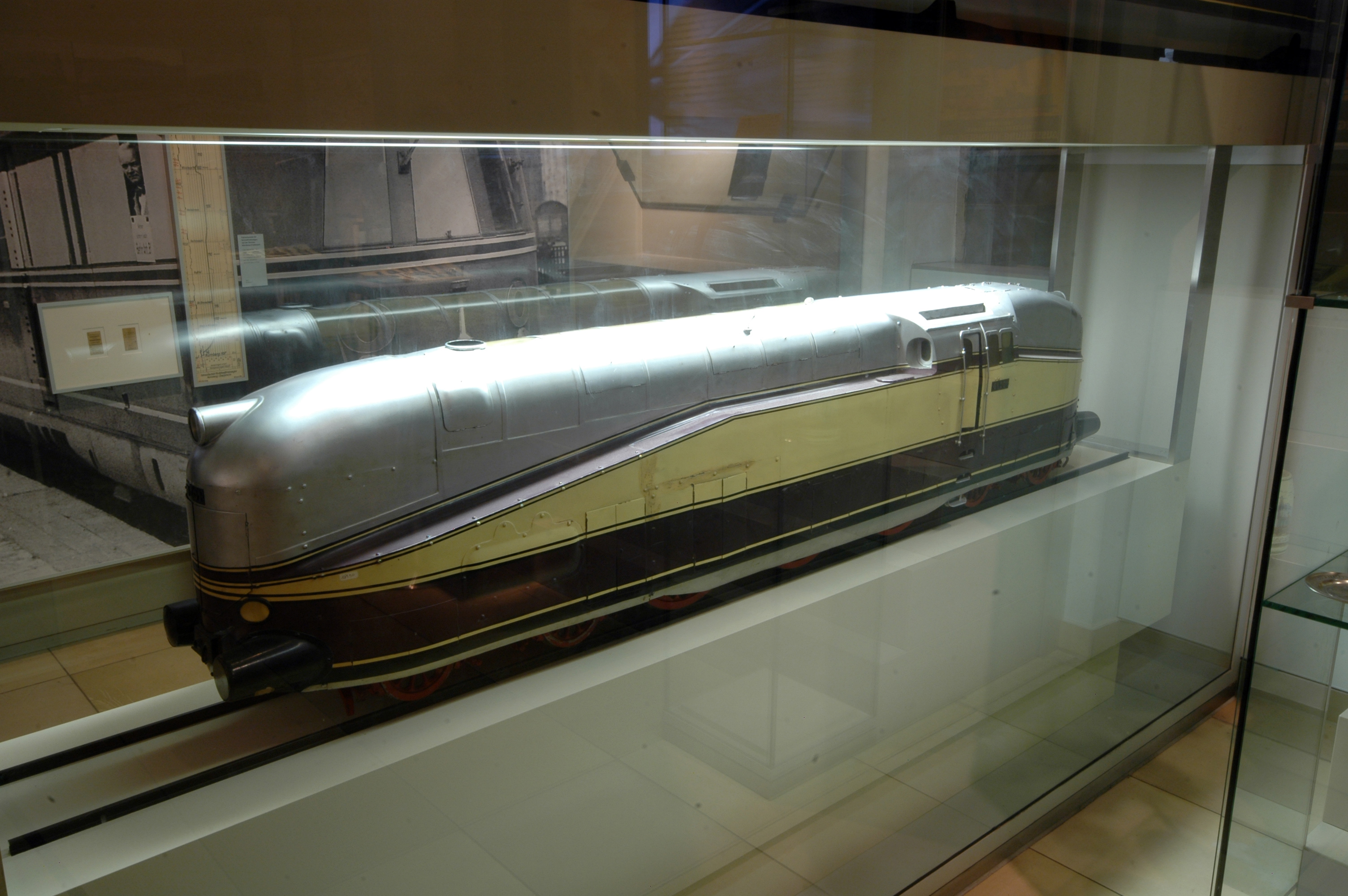
- Model of 61 001 in the Nuremberg Transport Museum
Type and origin
- Power type: Steam
- Builder: Henschel & Sohn
- Serial number: 22500
- Build date: 1935
Specifications
- Configuration
  - Whyte: 4-6-4T
  - UIC: 2′C2′ h2t
  - German: St 37.18
- Gauge: 1,435 mm (4 ft 8 1/2 in)
- Leading dia.: 1,100 mm (3 ft 7 1/4 in)
- Driver dia.: 2,300 mm (7 ft 6 1/2 in)
- Trailing dia.: 1,100 mm (3 ft 7 1/4 in)
- Wheelbase
  - Axle spacing (Asymmetrical): 2,350 mm (7 ft 8 1/2 in) +; 2,075 mm (6 ft 9 3/4 in) +; 2,550 mm (8 ft 4 3/8 in) +; 2,550 mm (8 ft 4 3/8 in) +; 2,475 mm (8 ft 1 1/2 in) +; 2,350 mm (7 ft 8 1/2 in) =
  - Engine: 14,350 mm (47 ft 1 in)
- Length
  - Over headstocks: 17,175 mm (56 ft 4 1/8 in)
  - Over buffers: 18,475 mm (60 ft 7 3/8 in)
- Height: 4,200 mm (13 ft 9 3/8 in)
- Axle load: 18.9 t (18.6 long tons; 20.8 short tons)
- Adhesive weight: 56.7 t (55.8 long tons; 62.5 short tons)
- Empty weight: 100.5 t (98.9 long tons; 110.8 short tons)
- Service weight: 129.1 t (127.1 long tons; 142.3 short tons)
- Fuel type: Coal
- Fuel capacity: 5 t (4.9 long tons; 5.5 short tons)
- Water cap.: 17 m^{3} (3,740 imp gal; 4,490 US gal)
- Firebox
  - Grate area: 2.75 m^{2} (29.6 sq ft)
- Boiler
  - Pitch: 3,000 mm (9 ft 10 1/8 in)
  - Tube plates: 5,000 mm (16 ft 4 7/8 in)
  - Small tubes: 54 mm (2 1/8 in), 88 off
  - Large tubes: 143 mm (5 5/8 in), 33 off
- Boiler pressure: 20 bar (20.4 kgf/cm^{2}; 290 psi)
- Heating surface
  - Firebox: 14.2 m^{2} (153 sq ft)
  - Tubes: 67.7 m^{2} (729 sq ft)
  - Flues: 70.0 m^{2} (753 sq ft)
  - Total surface: 151.9 m^{2} (1,635 sq ft)
- Superheater
  - Heating area: 69.2 m^{2} (745 sq ft)
- Cylinders: Two, outside
- Cylinder size: 460 mm × 750 mm (18 1/8 in × 29 1/2 in)
- Valve gear: Heusinger (Walschaerts)
- Loco brake: Hildebrand-Knorr automatic Schnellbahnbremse with auxiliary brakes and counterweight brake. Operating on both sides of all coupled and carrying wheels.
Performance figures
- Maximum speed: 175 km/h (109 mph)
- Indicated power: 1,450 PS (1,070 kW; 1,430 hp)
Career
- Operators: Deutsche Reichsbahn; Deutsche Bundesbahn
- Numbers: 61 001
- Withdrawn: November 1952

DRB 61 002
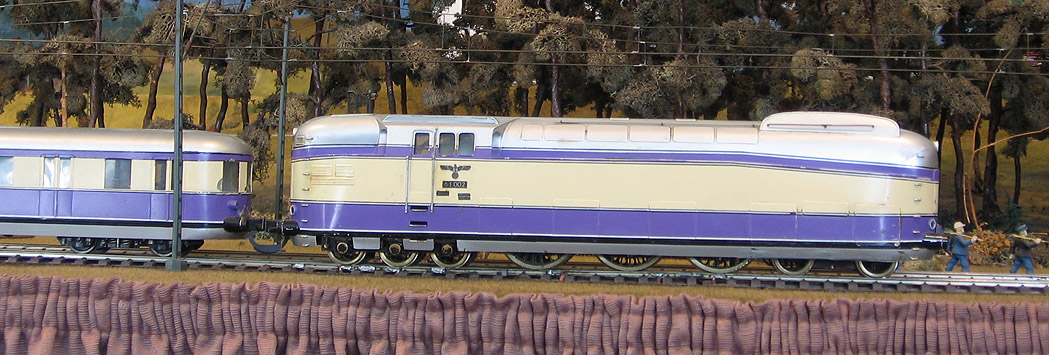
- O-scale model of 61 002 in the Dresden Transport Museum
Type and origin
- Power type: Steam
- Builder: Henschel & Sohn
- Serial number: 23515
- Build date: 1939
Specifications
- Configuration
  - Whyte: 4-6-6T
  - UIC: 2′C3′ h3t
  - German: St 38.19
- Driver: Divided: inner cylinder to 1st coupled axle, outer to 2nd
- Gauge: 1,435 mm (4 ft 8 1/2 in)
- Leading dia.: 1,100 mm (3 ft 7 1/4 in)
- Driver dia.: 2,300 mm (7 ft 6 1/2 in)
- Trailing dia.: 1,100 mm (3 ft 7 1/4 in)
- Wheelbase
  - Axle spacing (Asymmetrical): 2,350 mm (7 ft 8 1/2 in) +; 2,100 mm (6 ft 10 5/8 in) +; 2,550 mm (8 ft 4 3/8 in) +; 2,550 mm (8 ft 4 3/8 in) +; 2,475 mm (8 ft 1 1/2 in) +; 1,500 mm (4 ft 11 in) +; 1,500 mm (4 ft 11 in) =
  - Engine: 15,025 mm (49 ft 3 1/2 in)
- Length
  - Over headstocks: 17,525 mm (57 ft 6 in)
  - Over buffers: 18,825 mm (61 ft 9 1/8 in)
- Height: 4,500 mm (14 ft 9 1/8 in)
- Axle load: 18.75 t (18.45 long tons; 20.67 short tons)
- Adhesive weight: 56.29 t (55.40 long tons; 62.05 short tons)
- Empty weight: 112.9 t (111.1 long tons; 124.5 short tons)
- Service weight: 146.29 t (143.98 long tons; 161.26 short tons)
- Fuel type: Coal
- Fuel capacity: 6 t (5.9 long tons; 6.6 short tons)
- Water cap.: 21 m^{3} (4,620 imp gal; 5,550 US gal)
- Firebox
  - Grate area: 2.79 m^{2} (30.0 sq ft)
- Boiler
  - Pitch: 3,060 mm (10 ft 1/2 in)
  - Tube plates: 5,000 mm (16 ft 4 7/8 in)
  - Small tubes: 54 mm (2 1/8 in), 80 off
  - Large tubes: 143 mm (5 5/8 in), 35 off
- Boiler pressure: 20 bar (20.4 kgf/cm^{2}; 290 psi)
- Heating surface
  - Firebox: 14.3 m^{2} (154 sq ft)
  - Tubes: 61.5 m^{2} (662 sq ft)
  - Flues: 74.2 m^{2} (799 sq ft)
  - Total surface: 150.0 m^{2} (1,615 sq ft)
- Superheater
  - Heating area: 73.4 m^{2} (790 sq ft)
- Cylinders: Three
- Cylinder size: 390 mm × 660 mm (15 3/8 in × 26 in)
- Valve gear: Heusinger (Walschaerts)
- Loco brake: Hildebrand-Knorr automatic Schnellbahnbremse with auxiliary brakes and counterweight brake. Operating on both sides of all coupled and carrying wheels.
Performance figures
- Maximum speed: 175 km/h (109 mph)
Career
- Operators: Deutsche Reichsbahn; Deutsche Reichsbahn (GDR)
- Numbers: 61 002
- Disposition: Rebuilt to 18 201 in 1961

The two German DRG Class 61 steam engines were express train locomotives specifically built by Henschel for the Henschel-Wegmann train in service with the Deutsche Reichsbahn. The Henschel-Wegmann train was an initiative of the German locomotive construction industry, intended to be able to demonstrate a powerful steam locomotive-hauled train alongside the emerging express diesel multiple units, such as the Hamburg Flyer.

== Construction ==
61 001 and train at the Centenary of German Railways exhibition in 1935.

Because it was planned to run the train in shuttle services to a tight time schedule, it was necessary that the engine could run at top speed in both directions. This resulted in a tank locomotive rather than the tender locomotive design otherwise used for long-distance high-speed links. In order to be able to attain the high running performance aimed at, locomotives and coaches were designed to be especially light, albeit the coal and water supplies still had to be sufficient for a one-way trip on the planned route.

In building them, component designs from the Deutsche Reichsbahn's standard steam locomotives (Einheitsdampflokomotiven) were used as far as possible, but in quite a number of areas other components were used. The boiler overpressure was set at the higher level of 20 atm (293.9 psi), whereas those of the standard locos were operated at 16 atm (235.1 psi). Both locomotives were fitted with a streamlined shell. The water tank tapered at the front and gave the engine driver and stoker a good all-round view of the line. The "cover plates" covered the drive completely.

In contrast to the first engine, 61 002, which was built later, had a drive with three cylinders and larger supply tanks. To support the latter, the rear carrying bogie was extended to three axles. As a result of the more powerful drive, the punctuality of the train was improved - it had been unsatisfactory with 61 001. In addition the second locomotive had smoke deflectors on top next to the smoke exhaust, which were not fitted to 61 001.

== Operation ==
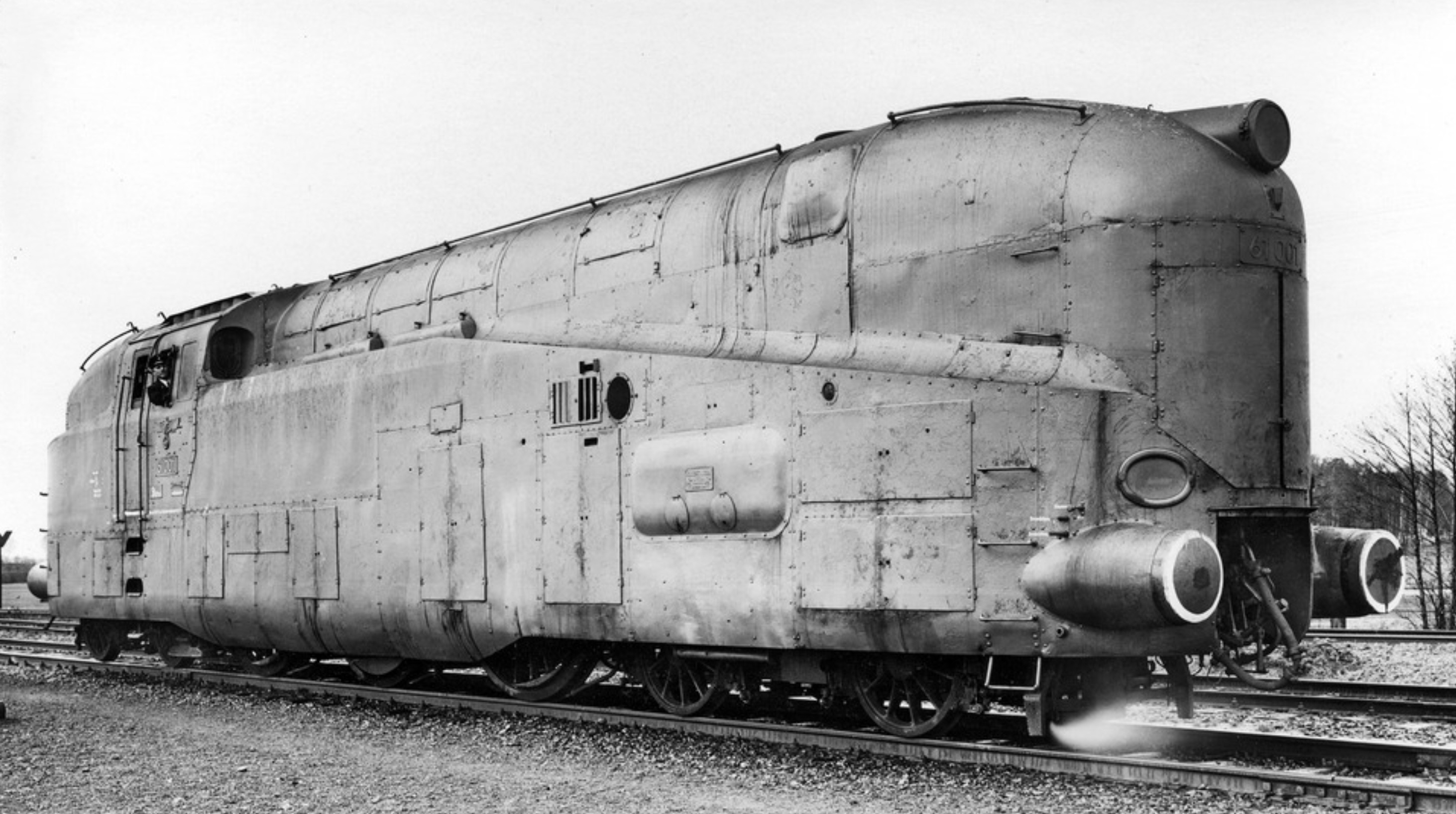
61 001 in monochrome war paint in 1940

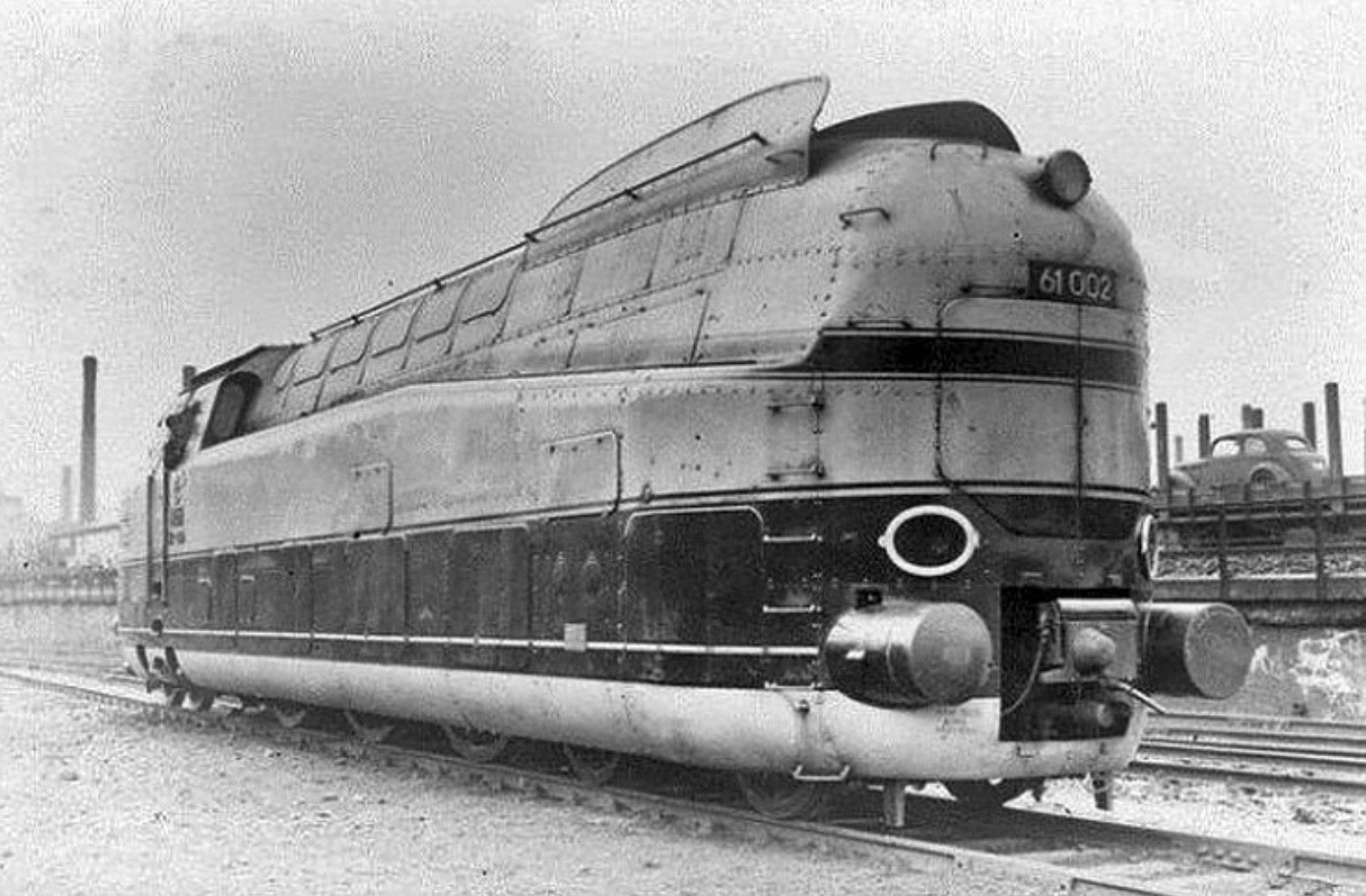
...or 61 002

With its 2,300-millimetre (90.55-inch) diameter driving wheels, the locomotive itself achieved the planned speed of 175 km/h (109 mph) without any difficulty, but when hauling its streamlined train it could only reach 160 km/h (99 mph). Nevertheless, the scheduled service between Dresden and Berlin was successfully delivered, the 176-kilometre (109 mi) long route being completed in just 102 minutes, a time that has not been beaten on this route even in the 21st century with the use of faster electric locomotives. However, it was pushed to complete the short turnaround allowed in Dresden because the locomotive had to turn around and fill up on coal and water.

When 61 001 was not available or having maintenance work carried out, a DRG Class 01 or DRG Class 03 headed the train. However, they could only reach top speeds of 130 kilometres per hour (81 mph).

Not long after construction had begun on 61 001, its variant 61 002 was planned and built at the start of 1939. In May of that year, the first factory trial runs were carried out and the locomotive was transferred on 12 June 1939 to the locomotive depot (Bahnbetriebswerk or Bw) at Grunewald. It was taken into service at the beginning of 1939/40, so it likely would not have hauled the streamlined train in regular passenger service due to the war and the Henschel-Wegmann train being reserved for Wehrmacht purposes.

After the train's operations ceased at the start of 1939, 61 001 was used for heating duties at Bw Berlin-Grunewald. From December 1940, it found itself once again in Dresden-Altstadt on express train services and was given conventional train and buffer equipment in November 1942. Its operations log shows that it was only sparingly used. From 1943 to the war's end, the Reichsbahn repair shop (Reichsbahnsausbesserungswerk or RAW) at Braunschweig was responsible for the engine. Between July 1945 and March 1946, it travelled about 40,000 kilometres (25,000 mi) hauling passenger trains.

== Survival post-1945 ==
Locomotive 61 001 found itself in the British Zone at the end of the war and was allocated to Bw Hannover, but seldom used. In 1947 it had a general inspection and on 23 October 1948 it was stationed in Bebra, where it was in regular service until May 1949. After a brief withdrawal, it again clocked up distances of 3,000 to 10,000 kilometres (1,900 to 6,200 miles) per month from November 1950. On 2 November 1951 the engine suffered serious damage following an accident in Münster, whereupon it was retired on 14 November 1952 and scrapped in 1957.

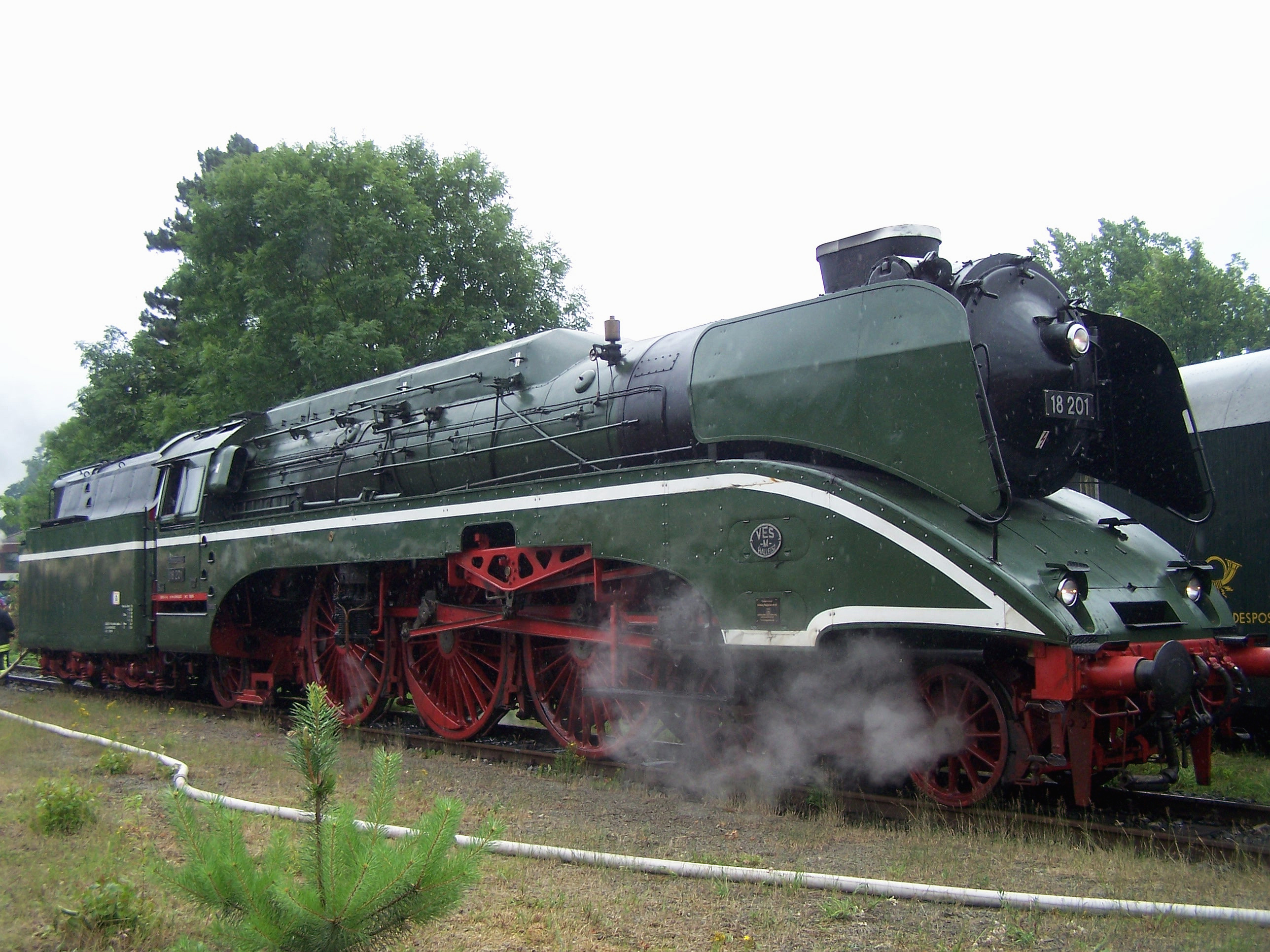
18 201 (ex 61 002)

Locomotive 61 002 remained in Dresden and was employed in passenger train service there. As a one-off it was however always a problem to use it for regular operations. For the Engineering Trials and Development Unit at Halle (Versuchs- und Entwicklungsstelle für Maschinenwirtschaft or VES-M Halle) under Max Baumberg, it was however interesting as an experimental engine for speeds over 160 km/h (99 mph). It was converted in 1961 by the DR in East Germany in RAW Meiningen to a fast experimental locomotive with a tender and reclassified as 18 201. With a modern boiler, the outer cylinders of H 45 024, a newly welded inner cylinder and the carrying axle of a high pressure locomotive, H 45 024, it reached speeds of up to 180 km/h (110 mph). In 2002, number 18 201 was totally overhauled in the Meiningen steam engine shop and is now in the possession of the Steam Plus company (Dampf-Plus GmbH) owned by Christian Goldschagg and Axel Zwingenberger.

== See also ==
- Deutsche Reichsbahn-Gesellschaft
- List of DRG locomotives and railbuses
- Grunewald Locomotive Research Office
- MÁV Class 242, a Hungarian streamlined 4-4-4T of similar age and purpose

== Literature ==
- Gottwaldt, Alfred (2005). Die Baureihe 61 und der Henschel-Wegmann-Zug (in German). Freiburg: EK-Verlag. ISBN 978-3-88255-161-7.
- Hütter, Ingo (2021). Die Dampflokomotiven der Baureihen 60 bis 91 der DRG, DRB, DB, und DR (in German). Werl: DGEG Medien. pp. 12–14. ISBN 978-3-946594-21-5.
- Bergsteiner, Leonhard (2005). "175 km/h mit Dampf. 70 Jahre Henschel-Wegmann-Zug". Lok Magazin (in German). 44 (283). München: GeraNova Zeitschriftenverlag GmbH: 68–72. ISSN 0458-1822.
- Weisbrod, Manfred; Müller, Hans; Petznik, Wolfgang (1978). Dampflokomotiven deutscher Eisenbahnen, Baureihe 60–96 (EFA 1.3) (in German) (4th ed.). Düsseldorf: Alba. pp. 12–17, 226–227. ISBN 3-87094-083-2.
