= Tank locomotive =

Steam locomotive which carries its fuel and water onboard

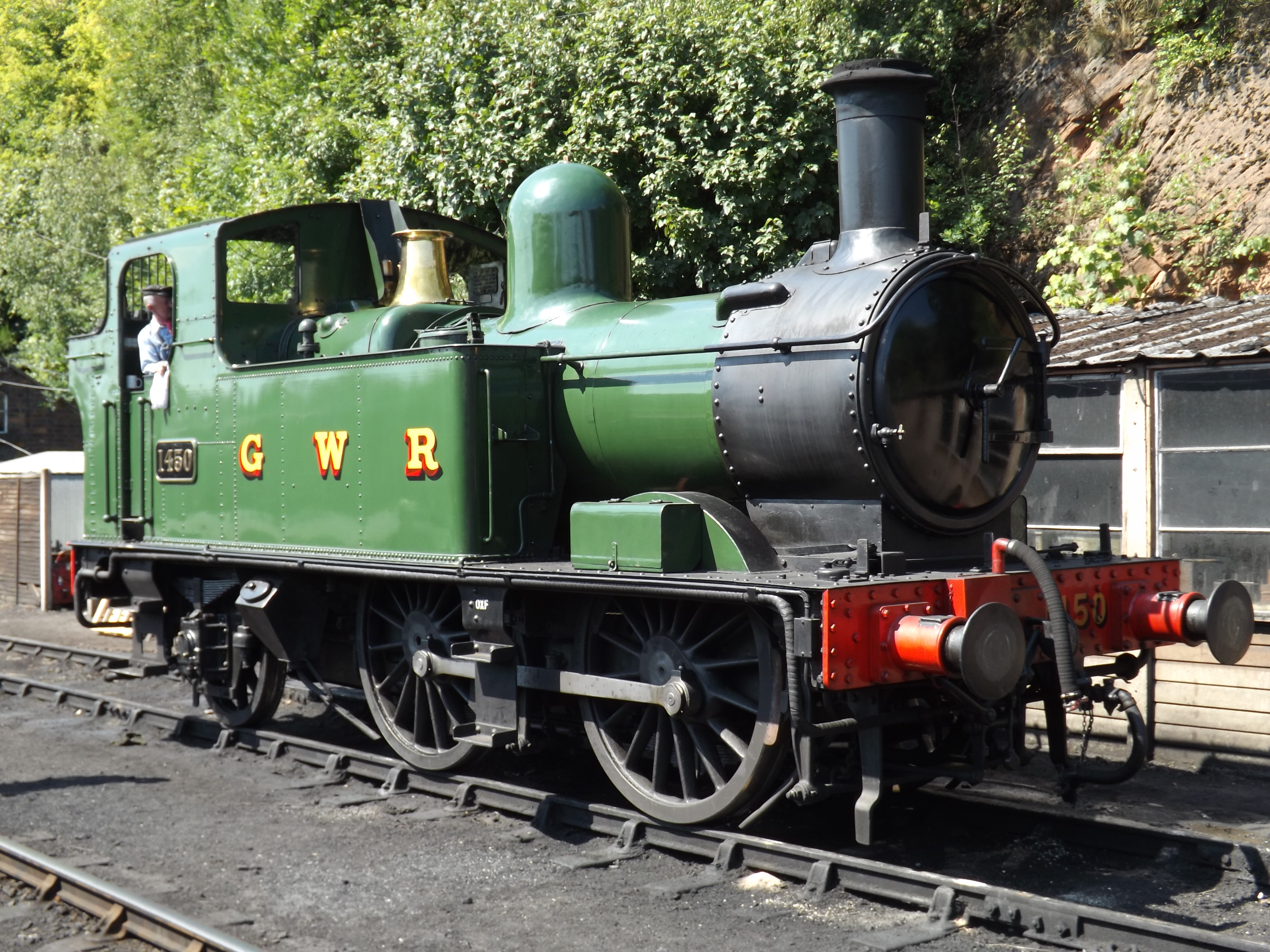
GWR 14xx class autotank

A tank locomotive, also called a tank engine, is a steam locomotive which carries its water in one or more on-board water tanks instead of a more traditional tender. Most tank engines also have bunkers (or fuel tanks) to hold fuel; tender–tank locomotives have tenders that hold some or all of the fuel as well as water.

There are several different types of tank locomotive, distinguished by the position and style of the water tanks and fuel bunkers. The most common type has tanks mounted either side of the boiler. This type originated about 1840 and quickly became popular for industrial tasks, and later for shunting and shorter-distance main line duties.

Tank locomotives have advantages and disadvantages compared to traditional locomotives that required a separate tender to carry needed water and fuel.

== History ==
=== Origins ===
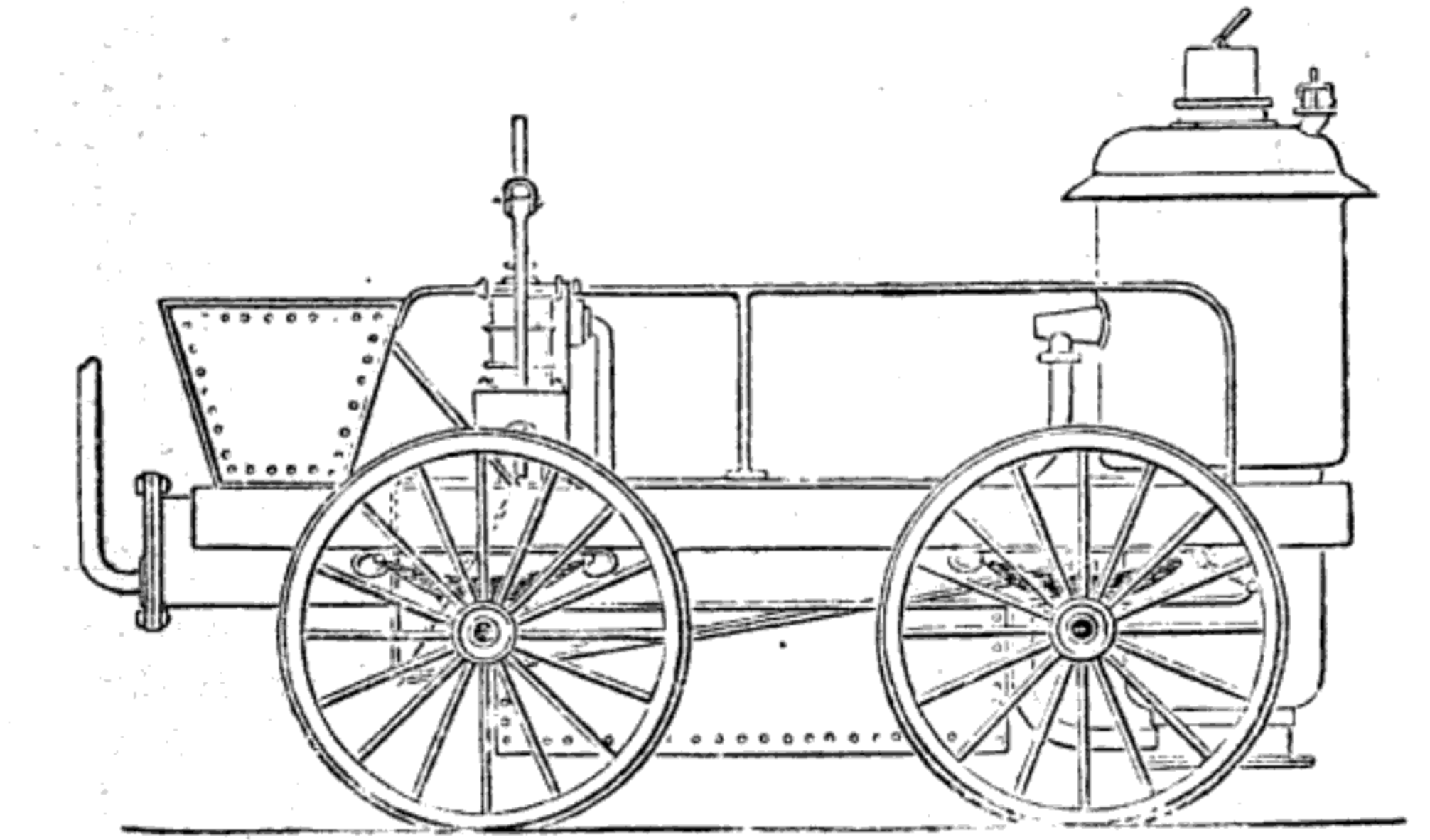
Drawing of the Novelty showing the large well tank between the wheels and below the frame

The first tank locomotive was the Novelty that ran at the Rainhill Trials in 1829. It was an example of a well tank. However, the more common form of side tank date from the 1840s; one of the first of these was supplied by George England and Co. of New Cross to the contractors building the Seaford branch line for the London Brighton and South Coast Railway in 1848. In spite of the early belief that such locomotives were inherently unsafe, the idea quickly caught on, particularly for industrial use and five manufacturers exhibited designs at The Great Exhibition in 1851. These were E. B. Wilson and Company, William Fairbairn & Sons, George England, Kitson Thompson and Hewitson and William Bridges Adams. By the mid-1850s tank locomotives were to be found performing a variety of main line and industrial roles, particularly those involving shorter journeys or frequent changes in direction.

== Types ==
There are a number of types of tank locomotive, based on the location and style of the water tanks.

=== Side tank ===
Side tanks are cuboid-shaped tanks that are situated on both sides of the boiler, extending all or part of the boiler's length. The tank sides extend down to the running platform, if such is present, for at least part of their length. This was a common configuration in the UK.

The length of side tanks was often limited in order to give access to the valve gear (inside motion). Tanks that ran the full length of the boiler provided greater water capacity and, in this case, cut-outs in the rectangular tank gave access to the valve gear. Longer side tanks were sometimes tapered downwards at the front to improve forward visibility. Side tanks almost all stopped at, or before, the end of the boiler barrel, with the smokebox protruding ahead. A few designs did reach to the front of the smokebox and these were termed 'flatirons'.

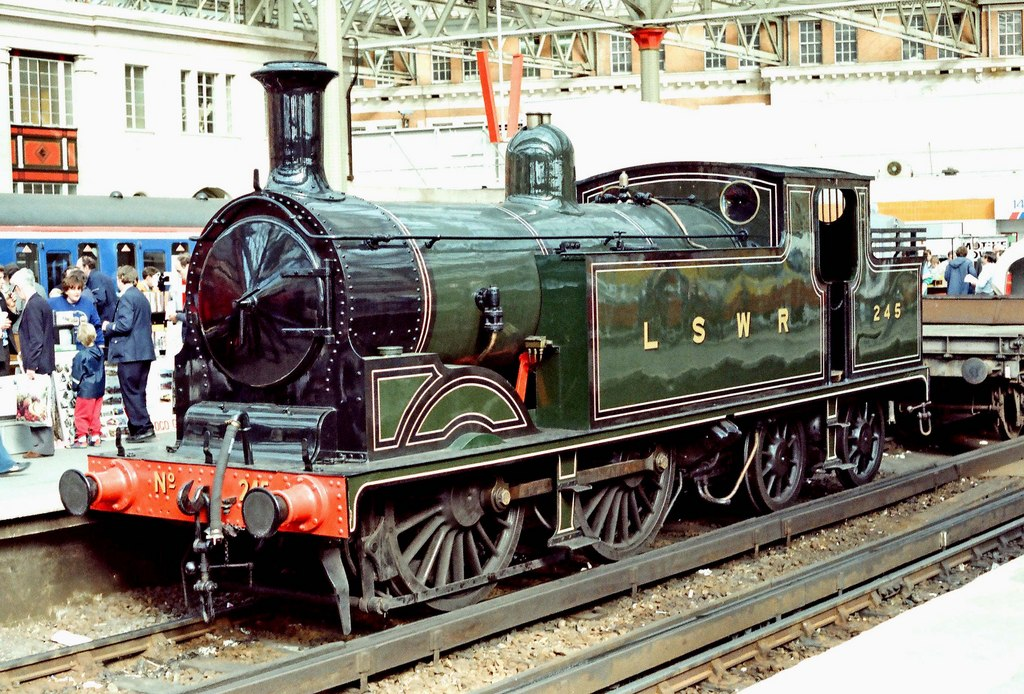
A LSWR M7 Class, typical side tank locomotive from 1897

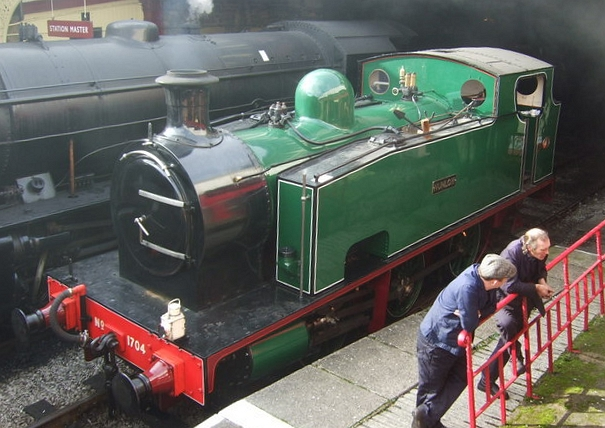
An example with a tapered front and cut-out to give access to the valve gear

=== Skirt tank ===
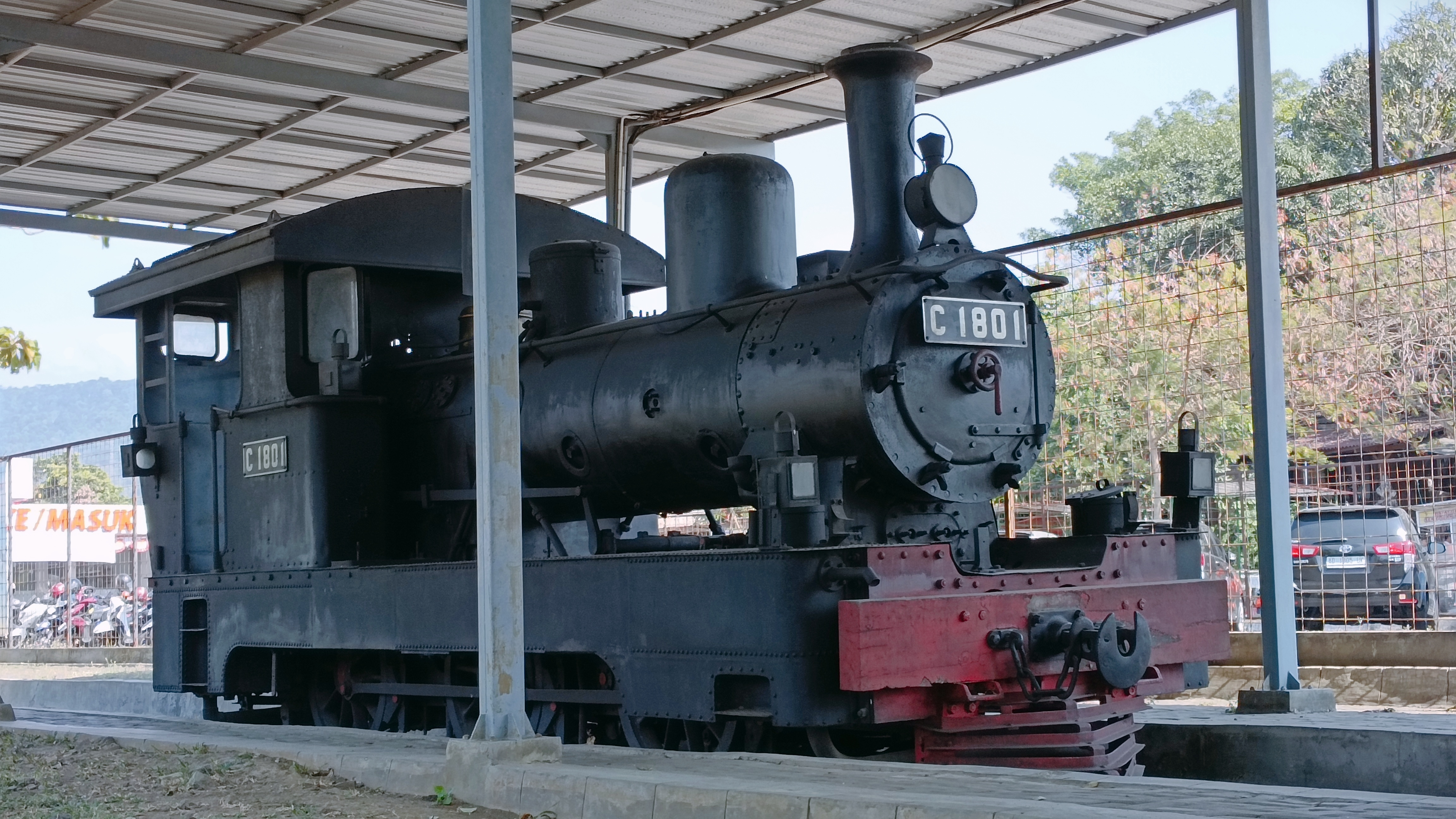
DKA class C18, a 0-6-0 skirt tank locomotive

Skirt tanks are a rare variant of side tanks that are set below footplate level instead, for stability. They were used on some Dutch and Belgian narrow gauge tram locomotives, including large Garratt articulated types. The tanks were fitted to the power bogies, obscuring the wheels and motion. As tram locomotives had their motion enclosed anyway, the loss of access was unimportant. Dutch influence extended to the large SS 800 2-12-2 Javanic 3 ft 6 in gauge tank locomotives built for the Dutch East Indies, where they were set low for stability.

=== Saddle tank ===
The water tank sits on top of the boiler like a saddle sits atop a horse. Usually, the tank is curved in cross-section, although in some cases there were straight sides surmounted by a curve (like an inverted 'U'), or even an ogee shape (a concave arc flowing into a convex arc). Walter Nielson patented the saddle tank arrangement in 1849.

Saddle tanks were a popular arrangement especially for smaller locomotives in industrial use. It gave a greater water supply, but limited the size of the boiler and restricted access to it for cleaning. Furthermore, the locomotive has a higher centre of gravity and hence must operate at lower speeds. The driver's vision may also be restricted, again restricting the safe speed.

The squared-off shape of the Belpaire firebox does not fit easily beneath a saddle tank, and so most saddle tanks retained the older round-topped boiler instead. A few American locomotives used saddle tanks that only covered the boiler barrel, forward of the firebox.

Water in the tank is slightly pre-heated by the boiler, which reduces the loss of pressure found when cold feedwater is injected into the boiler. However, if the water becomes too hot, injectors lose efficiency and can fail. For this reason, the tanks often stopped short of the hotter and uninsulated smokebox.

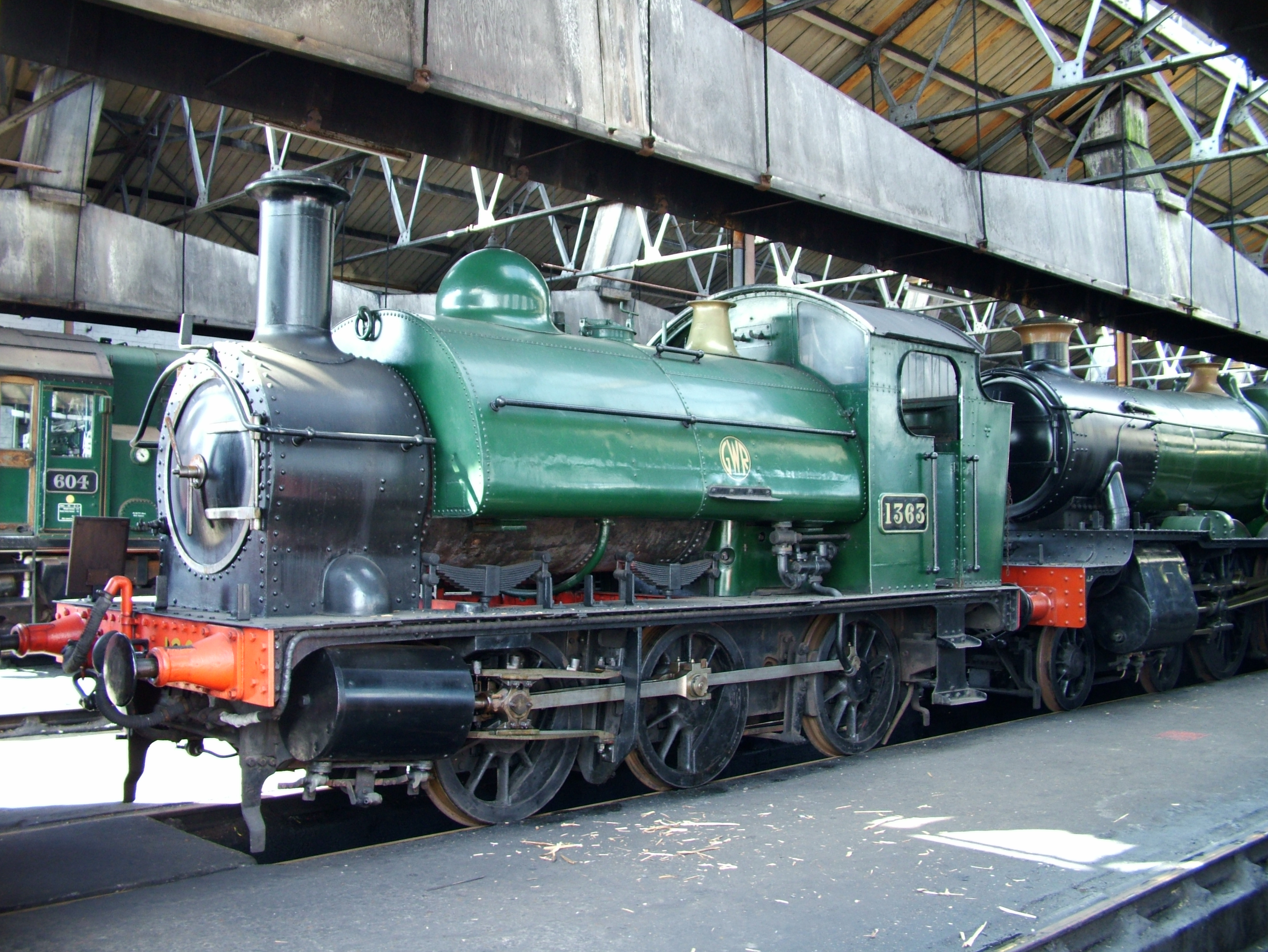
0-6-0. The saddle tank is in a firebox with a smokebox

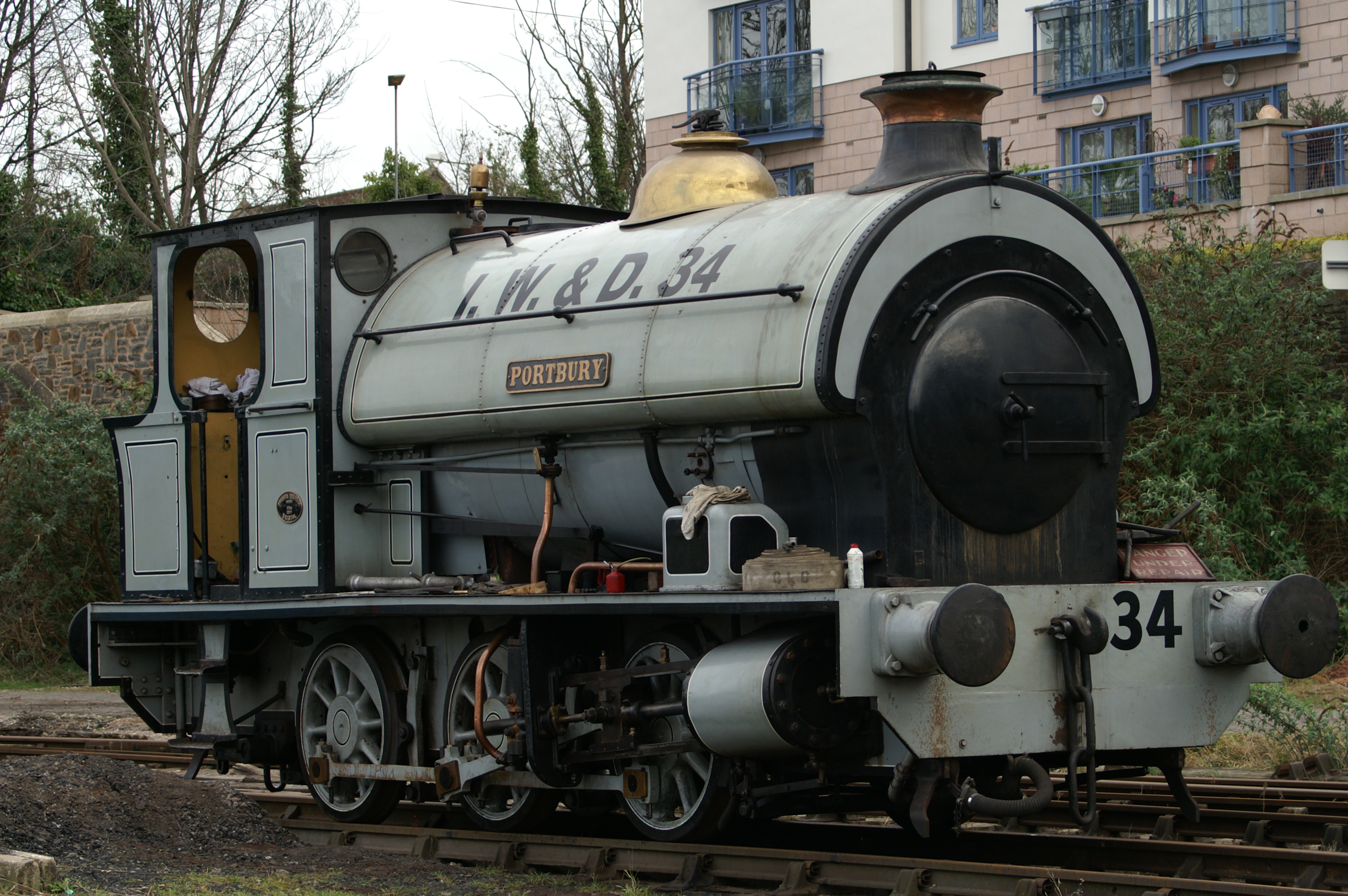
A typical curved-shaped saddle tank, covering both firebox and smokebox

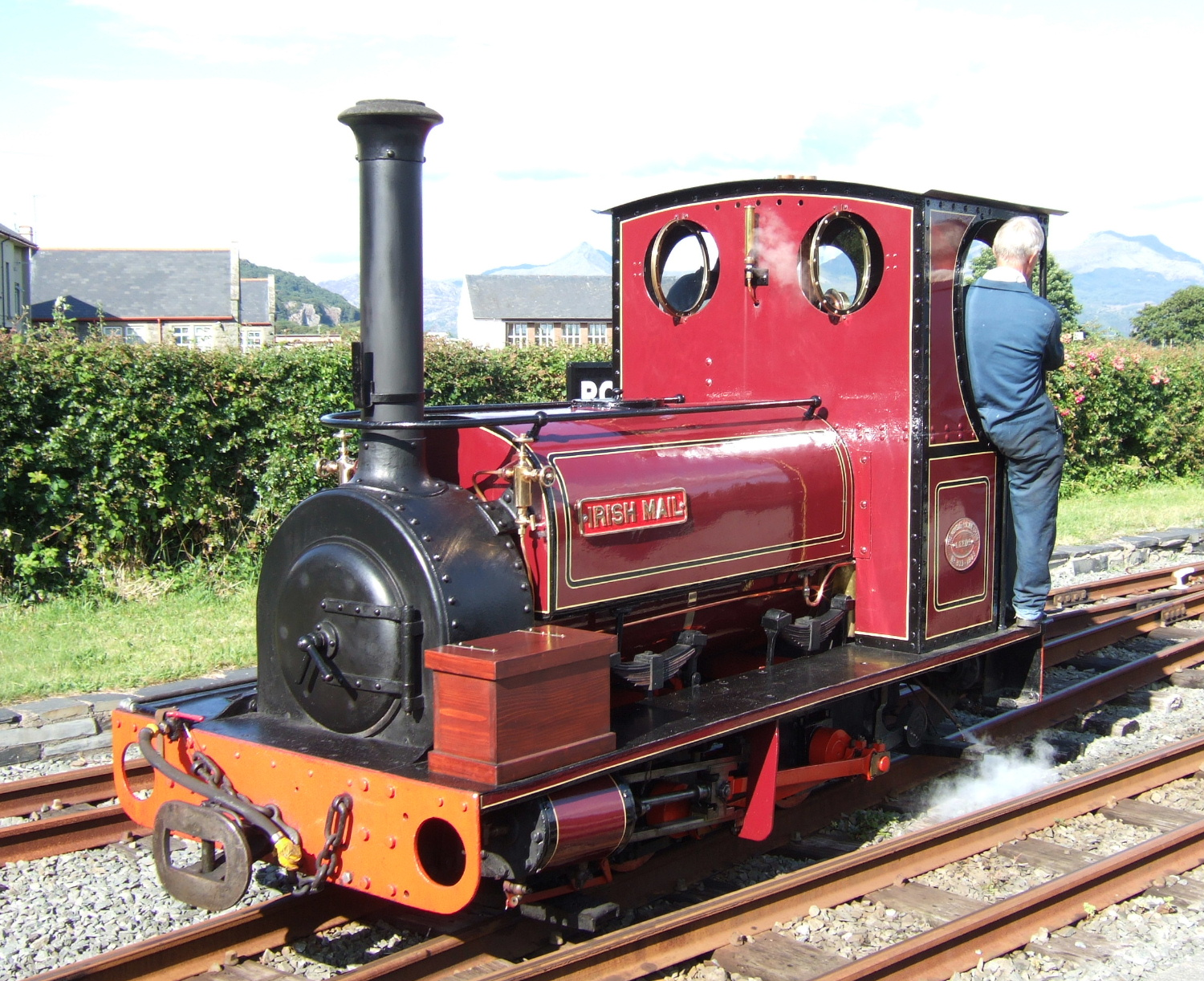
A Hunslet Alice Class saddle tank with both straight sides and a protruding smokebox

==== Box tank ====
Box tank locomotives have saddle tanks but the tank itself is cuboid-shaped. These locomotives were used globally, the most extensive user of such locomotives was the United States with many box tanks being used on the Pennsylvania Railroad on older steam locomotives built during the 19th century.

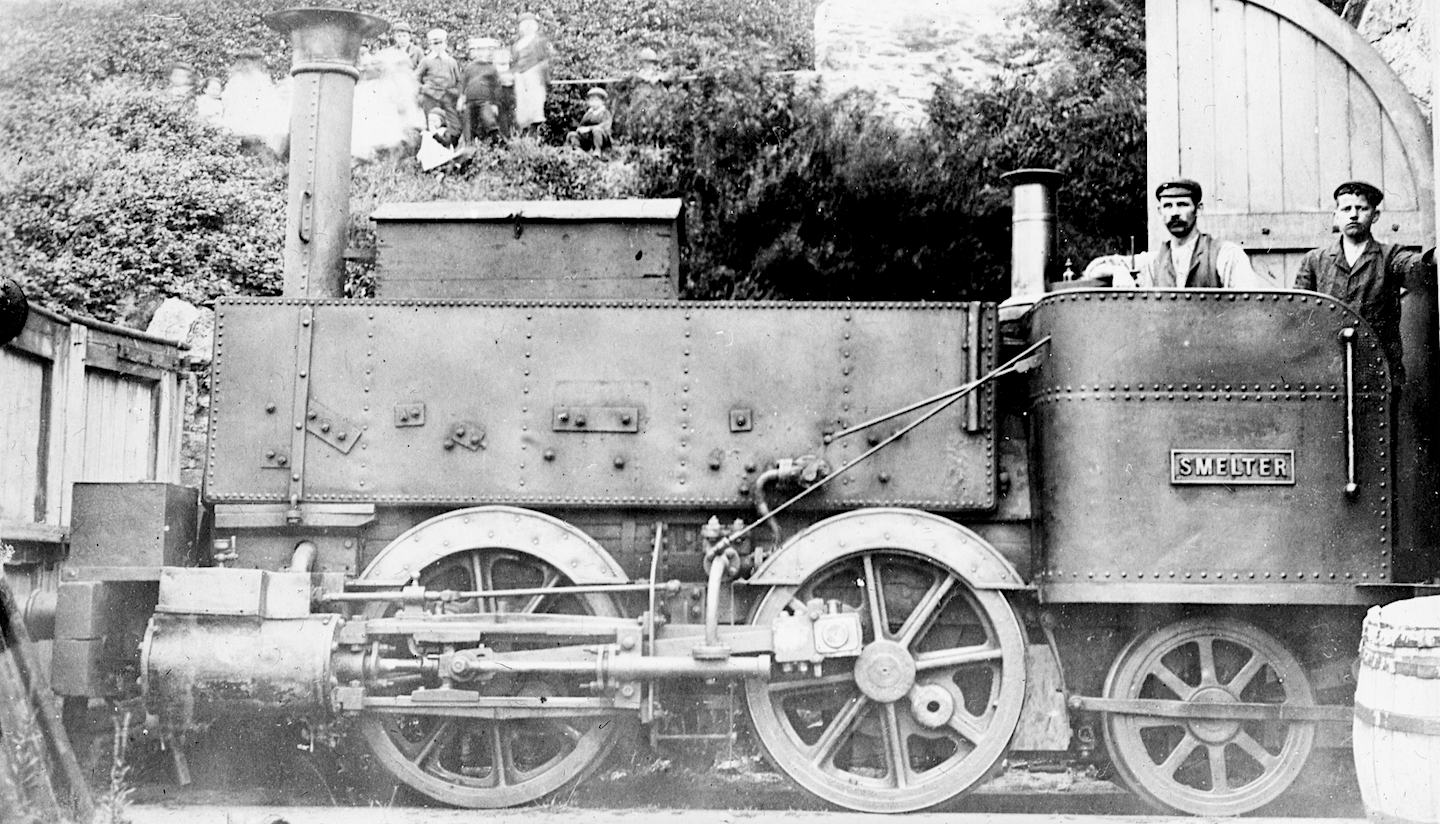
Redruth and Chasewater Railway box tank "Smelter" of 1854

=== Pannier tank ===
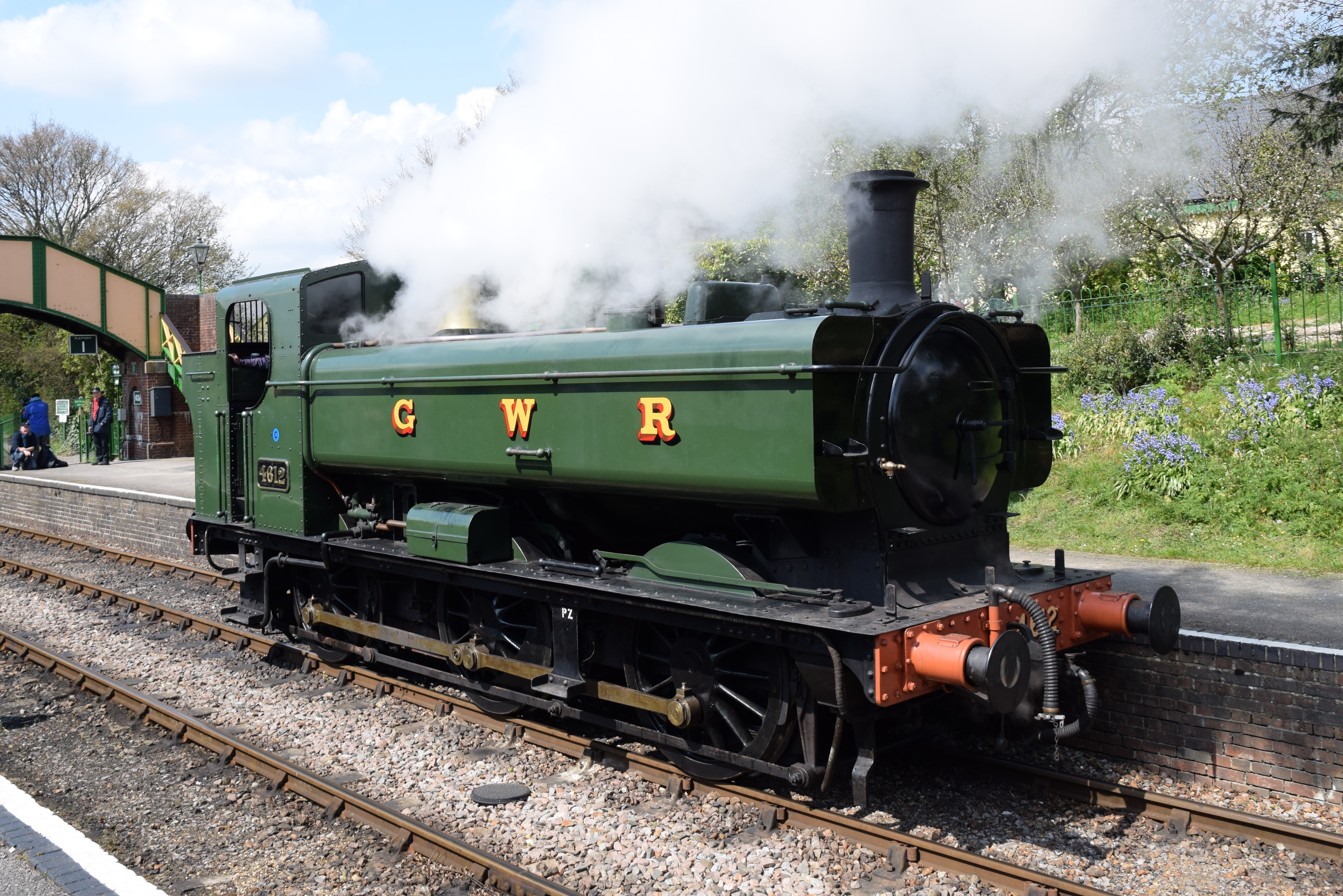
GWR 5700 Class Pannier tank

Pannier tanks are box-shaped tanks carried on the sides of the boiler, not carried on the locomotive's running plates. This leaves a space between the tanks and the running plate. Pannier tanks have a lower centre of gravity than a saddle tank, whilst still giving the same easy access to the valve gear. Pannier tanks are so-named because the tanks are in a similar position to the panniers on a pack animal.

Media related to Pannier tank locomotives at Wikimedia Commons

==== Belgium ====
In Belgium, pannier tanks were in use at least since 1866, once again in conjunction with Belpaire firebox. Locomotives were built for the Belgian State and for la Société Générale d'Exploitatation (SGE), a private company grouping smaller secondary lines.

==== United Kingdom ====
In the United Kingdom, pannier tank locomotives were used almost exclusively by the Great Western Railway. The first Great Western pannier tanks were converted from saddle tank locomotives when these were being rebuilt in the early 1900s with the Belpaire firebox. There were difficulties in accommodating the flat top of the latter within an encircling saddle tank which cut down capacity and increased the tendency to overheat the water in the tank. Pannier tank locomotives are often seen as an icon of the GWR.

==== United States ====
In Logging railroads in the Western USA used 2-6-6-2 Saddle tanks or Pannier tanks for heavy timber trains.

=== Well tank ===
In this design, used in earlier and smaller locomotives, the water is stored in a 'well' on the underside of the locomotive, generally between the locomotive's frames. This arrangement was patented by S.D. Davison in 1852. This does not restrict access to the boiler, but space is limited there, and the design is therefore not suitable for locomotives that need a good usable range before refilling. The arrangement does, however, have the advantage of creating a low centre of gravity, creating greater stability on poorly laid or narrow-gauge tracks. The first tank locomotive, Novelty, was a well tank.

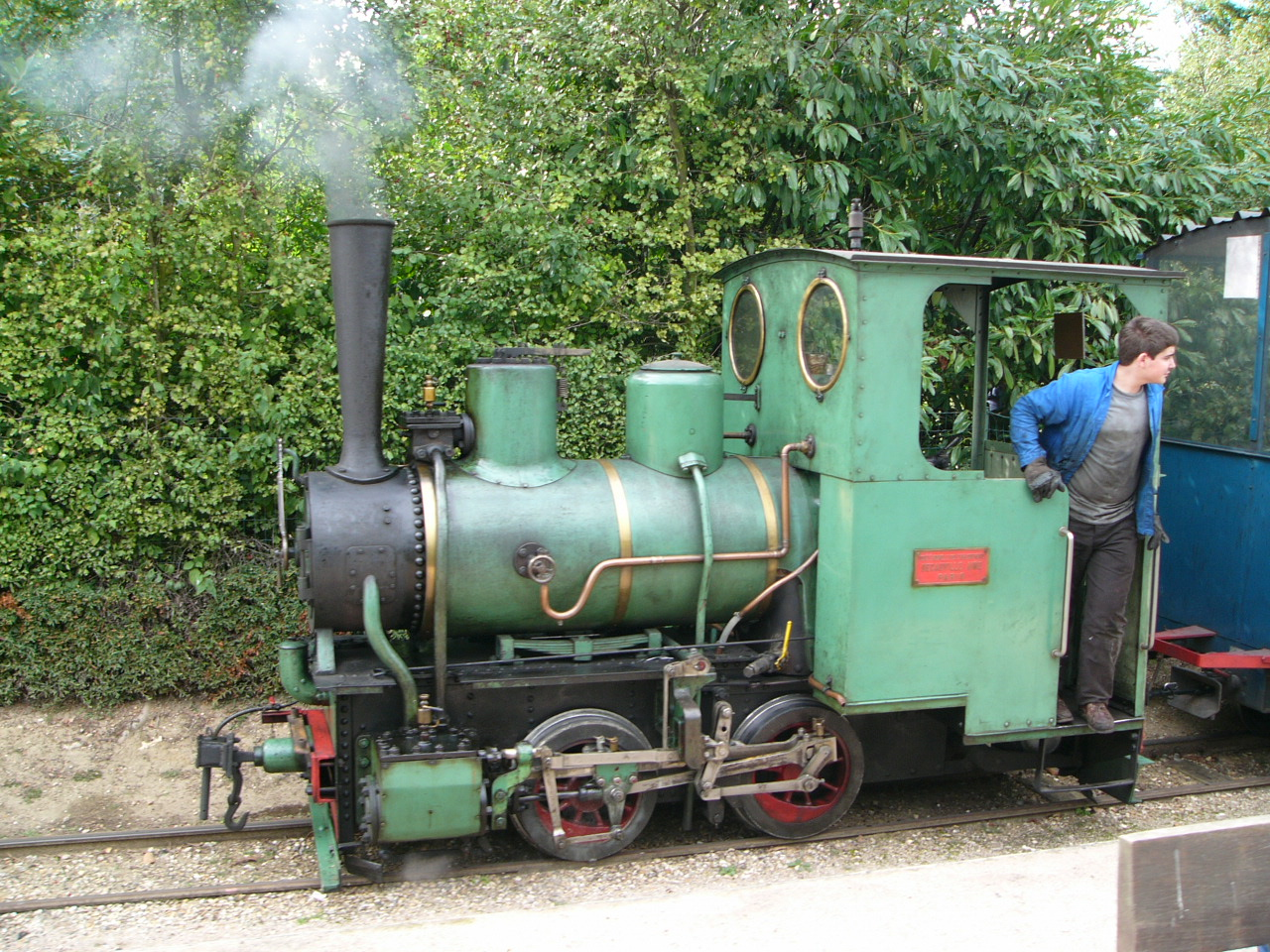
A French Decauville well tank

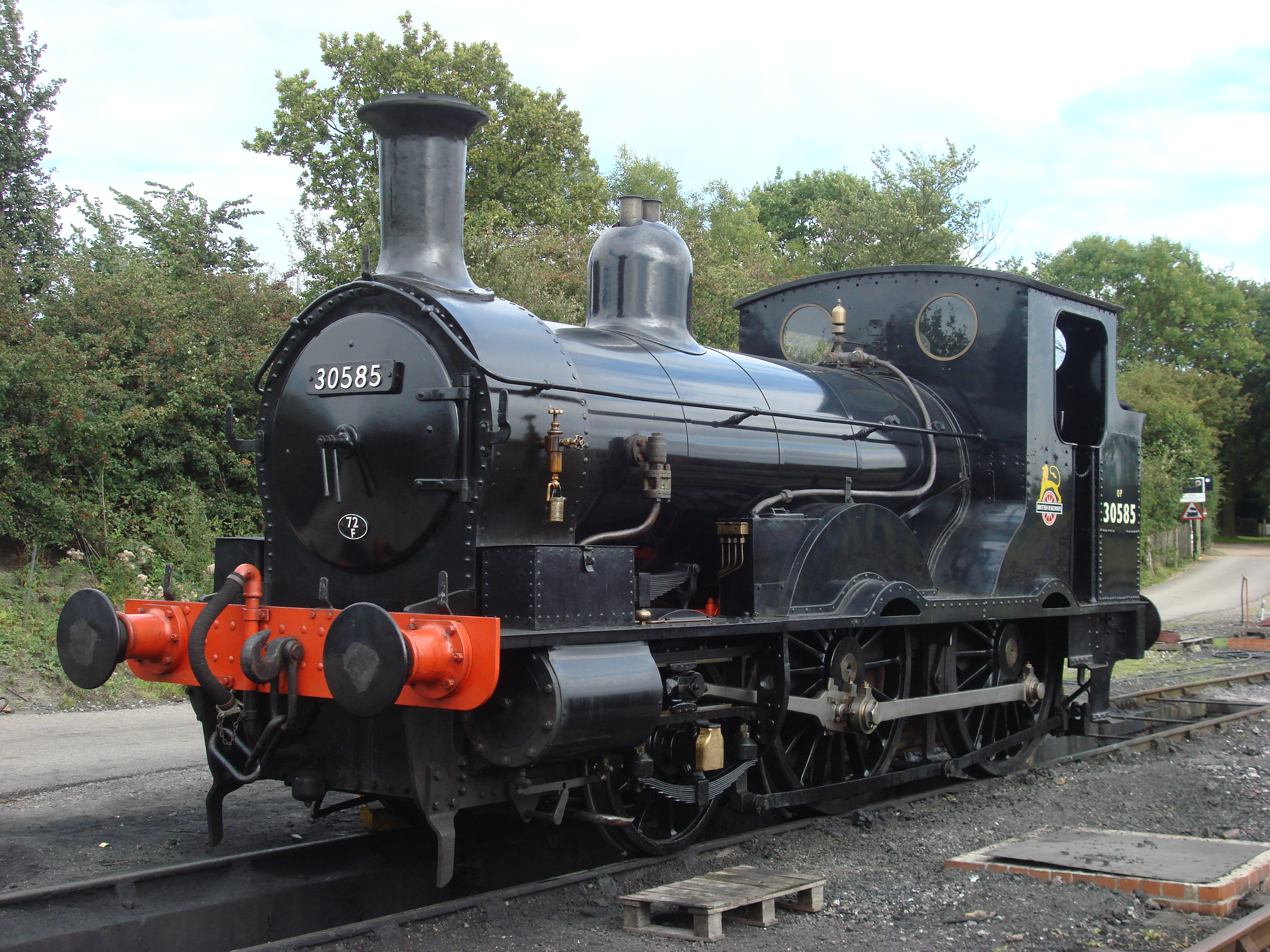
A British LSWR 0298 "Beattie" well tank formerly used on suburban services in London

Media related to Well tank locomotives at Wikimedia Commons

=== Rear tank (or back tank) ===
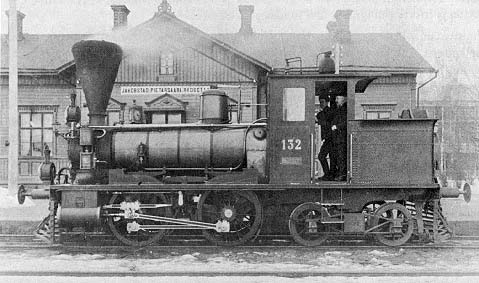
A Finnish Steam Locomotive Class F1 rear tank locomotive

In this design, the tank is placed behind the cab, usually over a supporting bogie. This removes the weight of the water from the driving wheels, giving the locomotive a constant tractive weight. The disadvantage is a reduction in water carrying capacity. A rear tank is an essential component of the American Forney type of locomotive, which is a 4-4-0 American-type with wheels reversed.

Back tanks were a common feature in combination with side tanks for large tank locomotives. Their coal bunker was raised above the footplate and given a sloped floor, to assist with shovelling coal from it. The space beneath, which might include also a well tank below the footplate, was then used as additional water tank space.

=== Wing tank ===
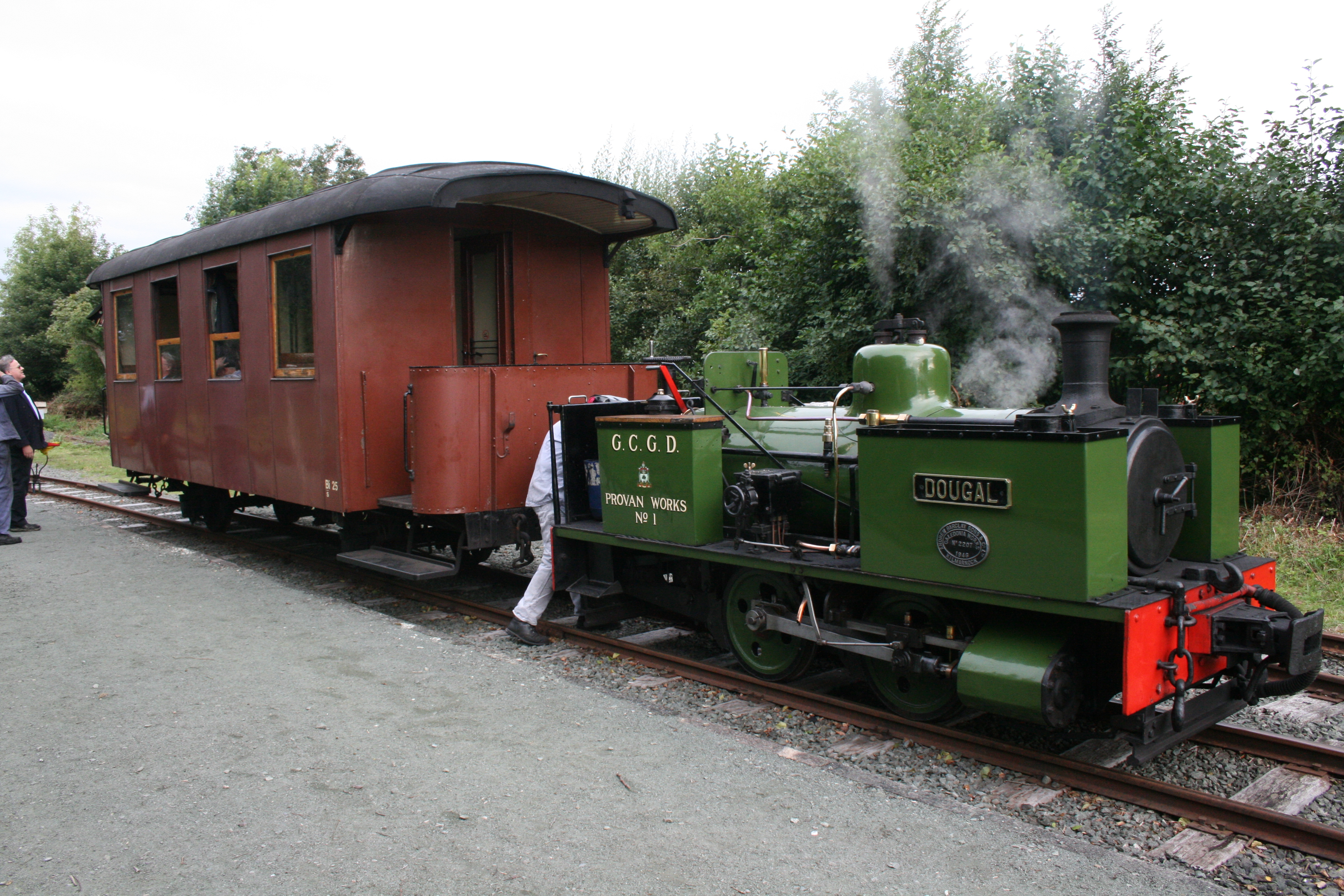
Wing tank locomotive Dougal on the Welshpool and Llanfair Light Railway

Wing tanks are side tanks that run the length of the smokebox, instead of the full length of the boiler. In the early 19th century the term "wing tank" was sometimes used as a synonym for side tank.

Wing tanks were mainly used on narrow-gauge industrial locomotives that could be frequently re-filled with water and where side or saddle tanks would restrict access to valve gear. The Kerry Tramway's locomotive Excelsior has been described, by various sources, as both a wing tank and an inverted saddle tank.

=== Inverted saddle tank ===
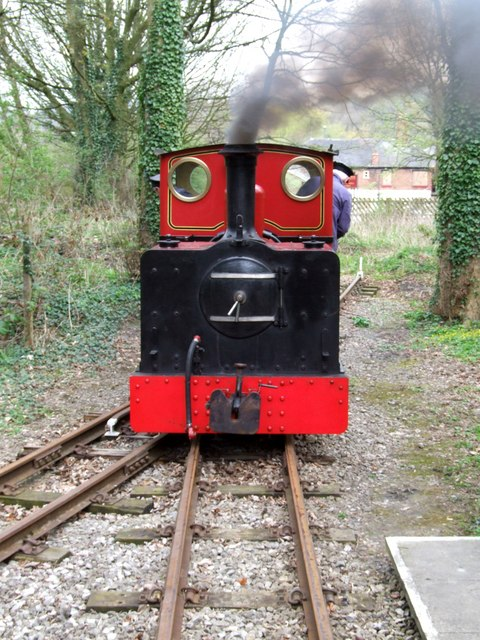
Joan on the Golden Valley Light Railway showing the inverted saddle tank around the smokebox

The inverted saddle tank was a variation of the wing tank where the two tanks were joined underneath the smokebox and supported it. This rare design was used for the same reasons as the wing tank but provided slightly greater water capacity. The Brill Tramway locomotive Wotton is believed to have had an inverted saddle tank. The inverted saddle tank was a speciality of W.G.Bagnall.

=== Tender–tank ===
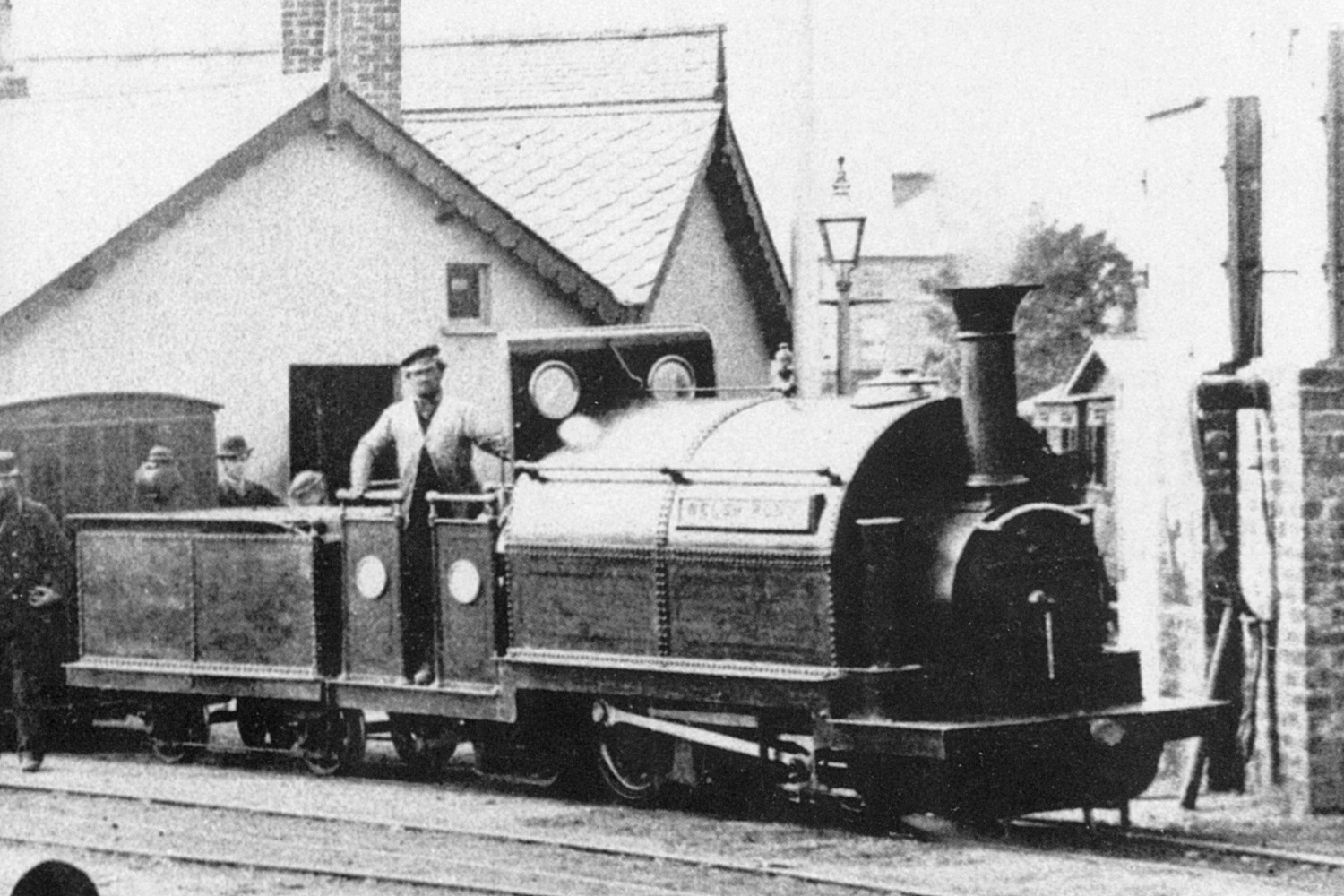
Ffestiniog Railway tender–tank locomotive Welsh Pony

A tank locomotive may also haul a tender behind it. This was the common arrangement on the largest locomotives, as well as on narrow-gauge railways where the small size of the locomotive restricts the space available for fuel and water. These combined both fuel and water in a proportion (where coal was used) of one unit mass of coal for every six of water..

Where a tender was used with a narrow-gauge locomotive it usually carried only fuel, with water carried in the locomotive's tanks. The tender offered greater fuel capacity than a bunker on the locomotive and often the water capacity could be increased by converting redundant bunker space into a water tank.

=== Combinations ===
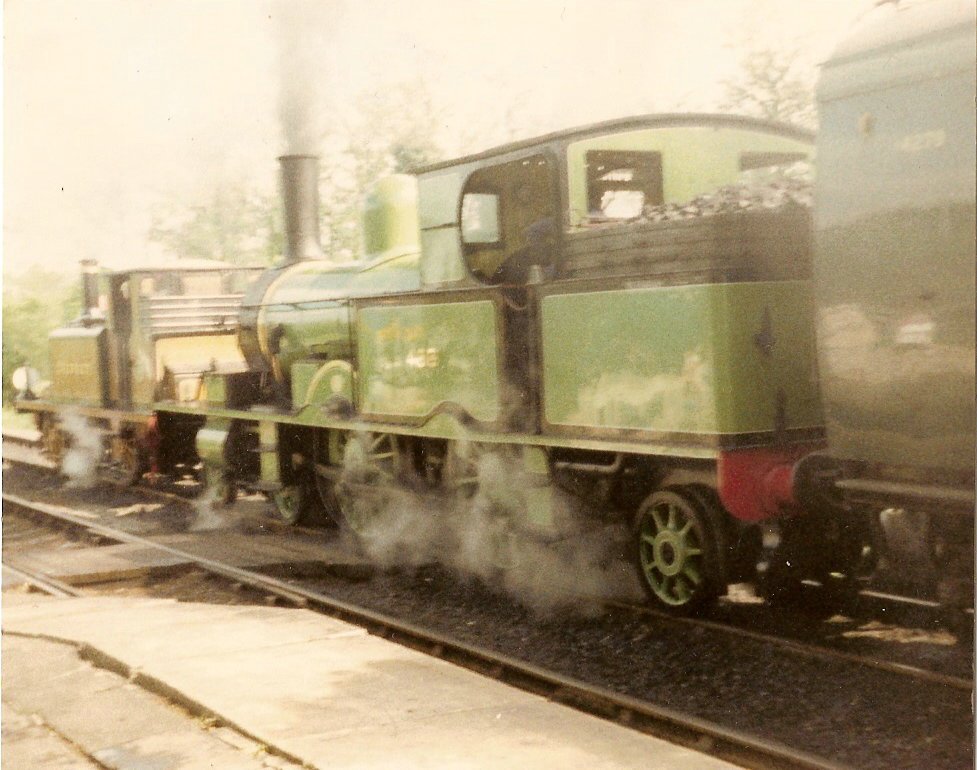
The LSWR 415 class combined side tanks and a well tank.

Large side tank engines might also have an additional rear tank (under the coal bunker), or a well tank (between the frames). This may have been to increase the water capacity, to equalise the weight distribution, or else improve the stability by lowering the centre of gravity.

== Locomotive classification and wheel arrangement ==
Because tank locomotives are capable of running equally fast in both directions (see below) they usually have symmetrical wheel arrangements to ensure the same ride and stability characteristics regardless of the direction travelled, producing arrangements with only driving wheels (e.g. 0-4-0T and 0-6-0T) or equal numbers of leading and trailing wheels (e.g. 2-4-2T and 4-6-4T). However other requirements, such as the need to support a large bunker, would require a non-symmetrical layout such as 2-6-4T.

=== Whyte classification ===
In the Whyte notation for classification of locomotives (primarily by wheel arrangement), various suffixes are used to denote tank locomotives:

Suffix	Meaning	Example
T	Side tank locomotive	0-6-0T
RT	Rear tank locomotive	0-4-4RT
ST	Saddle tank locomotive	0-6-0ST
WT	Well tank locomotive	0-6-0WT
PT	Pannier tank locomotive	0-6-0PT
CT	Crane tank locomotive	0-6-0CT
IST	Inverted saddle tank locomotive	0-6-0IST
T+T	Tender–tank locomotive	0-4-0T+T

=== UIC classification ===
In the UIC notation which also classifies locomotives primarily by wheel arrangement, the suffix 't' is used to denote tank locomotives

== Fuel bunker ==
On tank locomotives which use solid fuels, such as coal, a bunker is used to carry the fuel (for locomotives using liquid fuel such as oil, a fuel tank is used). There are two main positions for bunkers on tank locomotives: to the rear of the cab (as illustrated in the left of the images below), a position typically used on locomotives with a trailing carrying axle or a trailing bogie; or on top of and to one side of the firebox, a positioning typically used in cases where the firebox overhangs the rear driving axle, as this counterbalances the overhanging weight of the firebox, stabilising the locomotive.

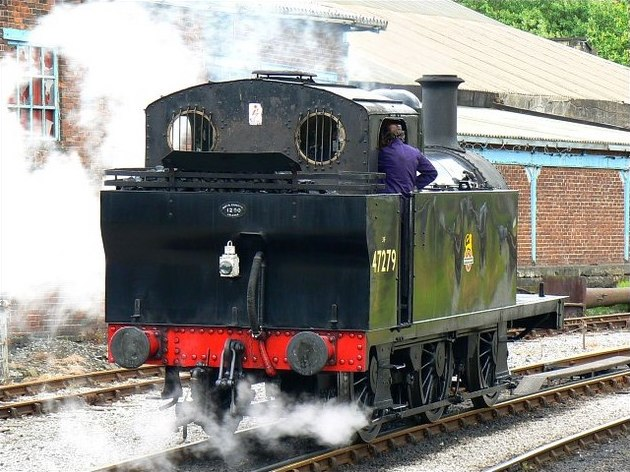
A rear bunker

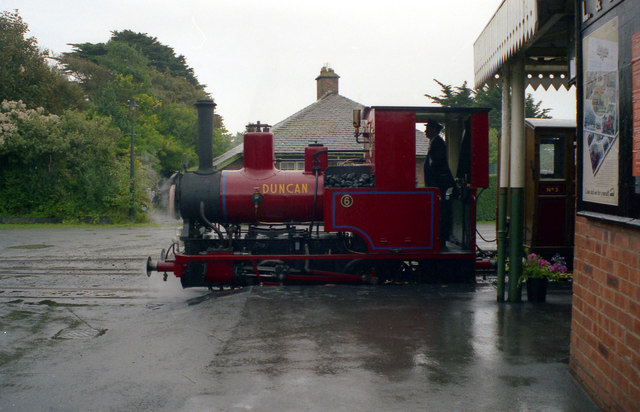
A side bunker

== Other types of tank locomotive ==
There are several other specialised types of steam locomotive which carry their own fuel but which are usually categorised for different reasons.

=== Garratt locomotive ===
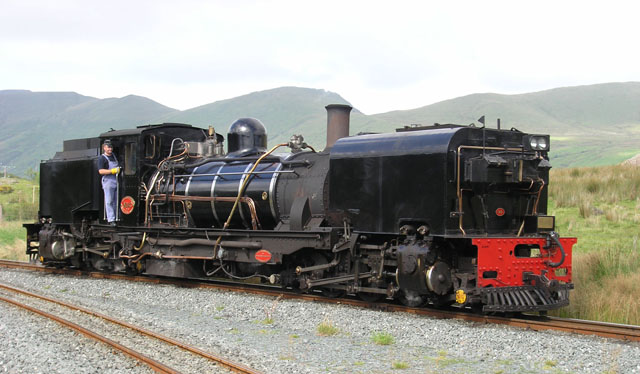
South African Railways NGG16 class Garratt, preserved in Wales

A Garratt locomotive is articulated in three parts. The boiler is mounted on the centre frame without wheels, and two sets of driving wheels (four cylinders total) carrying fuel bunkers and water tanks are mounted on separate frames, one on each end of the boiler. Articulation is used so larger locomotives can go around curves which would otherwise restrict the size of rigid-framed locomotives. One of the major advantages of the Garratt form of articulation is the maintenance of the locomotive's centre of mass over or inside the track centre line when rounding curves.

=== Crane tank locomotive ===
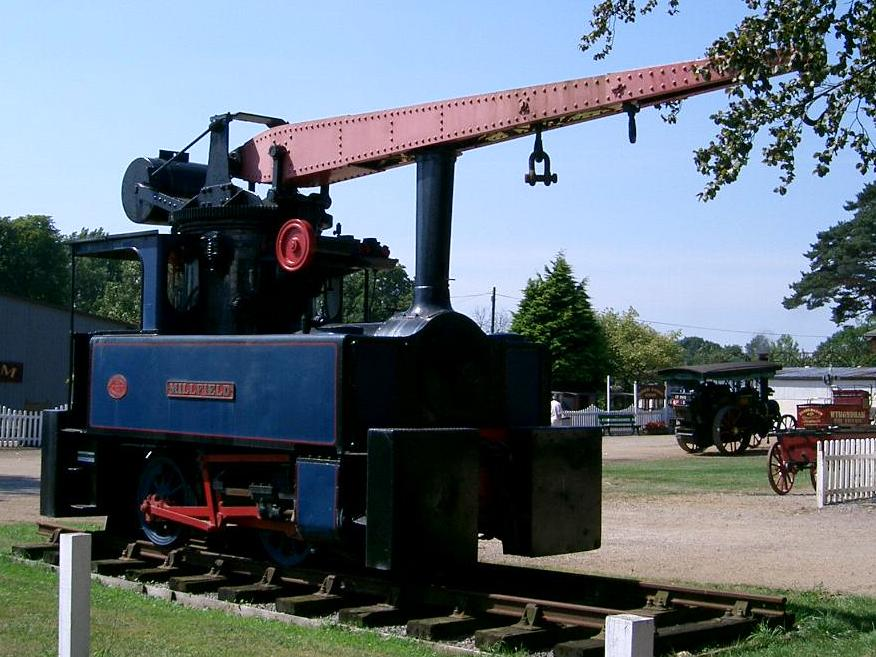
A crane tank preserved as a static exhibit at Bressingham

A crane tank (CT) is a steam tank locomotive fitted with a crane for working in railway workshops or other industrial environments. The crane may be fitted at the front, centre or rear.

=== Streamlined tank locomotive ===
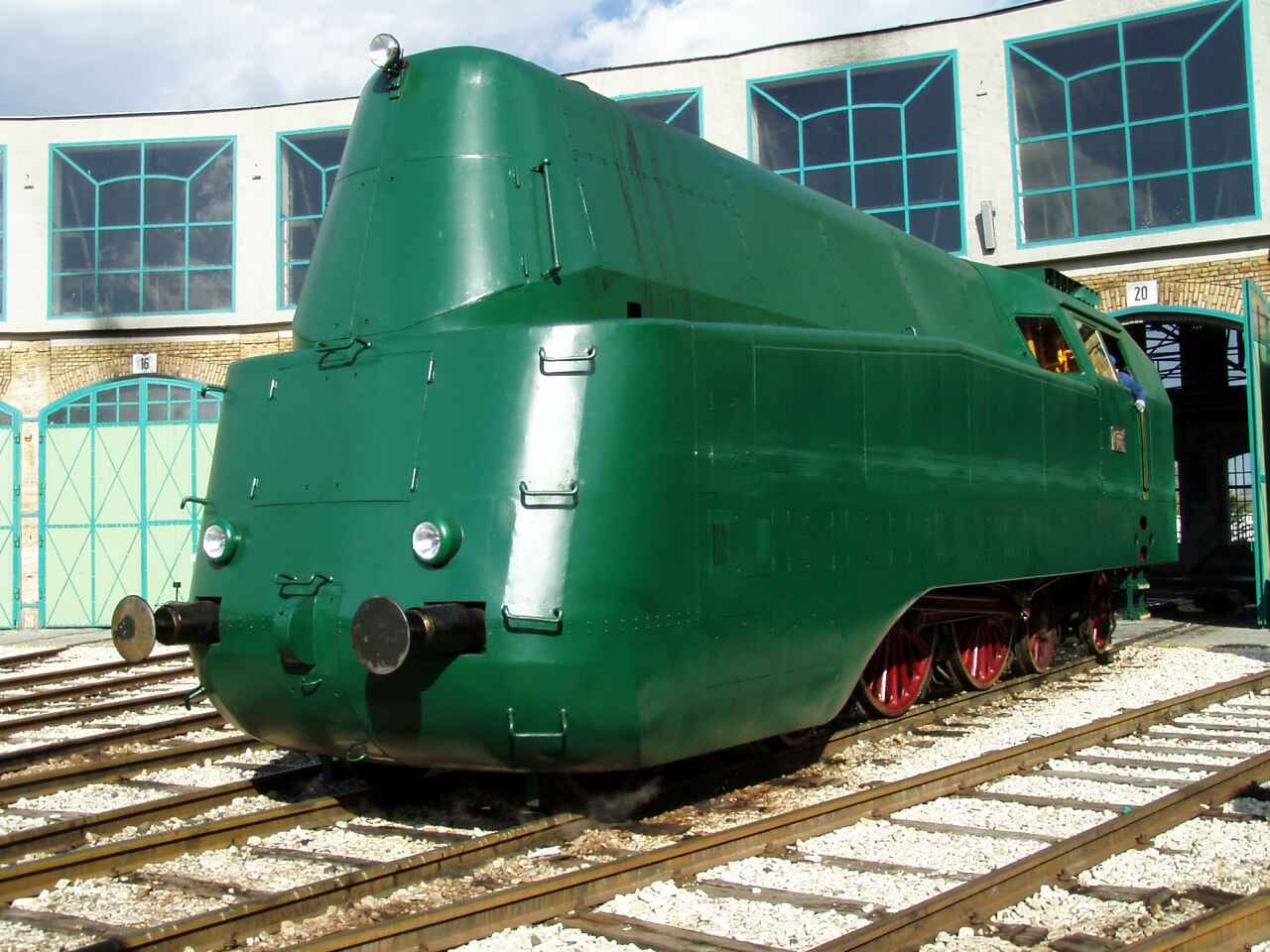
Hungarian Railways class 242

During the 1930s there was a trend for express passenger locomotives to be streamlined by enclosed bodyshells. Express locomotives were nearly all tender locomotives, but a few fast tank engines were also streamlined, for use on high-speed, but shorter, services where turn-around time was important and the tank engine's independence from turntables was useful. Examples included the German Class 61 and the Hungarian Class 242.

=== Contractor's locomotive ===
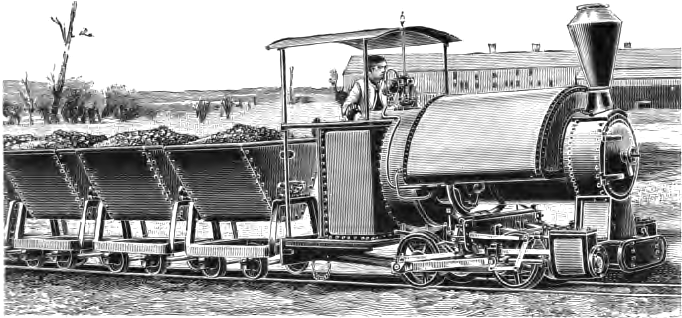
Small Bagnall contractor's locomotive, with Bagnall's distinctive cylindrical firebox

The contractor's locomotive was a small tank locomotive specially adapted for use by civil engineering contractor firms engaged in the building of railways. The locomotives would be used for hauling men, equipment and building materials over temporary railway networks built at the worksite that were frequently re-laid or taken up and moved elsewhere as building work progressed. Contractor's locomotives were usually saddle or well tank types (see above) but required several adaptations to make them suitable for their task. They were built to be as light as possible so they could run over the lightly built temporary rails and had deeply flanged wheels so they did not de-rail on the tracks which were often very uneven.

At the same time, they had to be very powerful with good traction as they would often have to haul trains of wagons up very steep gradients, such as the sides of railway embankments or spoil heaps. Many were designed so that large iron ballast blocks could be fitted to the frames when extra weight and traction was required, then removed when it was not. Most had sanding gear fitted to all wheels for maximum traction. Some method of keeping mud and dust from clogging the wheels and brake shoes was also required – this either took the form of scraper bars fitted to the leading edge of the wheels or wheel washer jets supplied from the water tank. To handle long trains of loose-coupled (and often un-sprung) wagons, contractor's locomotives usually had very effective steam-powered brakes. Most lacked a full cab, often only having a front 'spectacle plate'. If a cab was provided it was usually removable along with the chimney, and sometimes the dome, so that the locomotive could be loaded onto a flatbed wagon for transport to new locations by rail whilst remaining within the loading gauge.

=== Steam tram engines ===
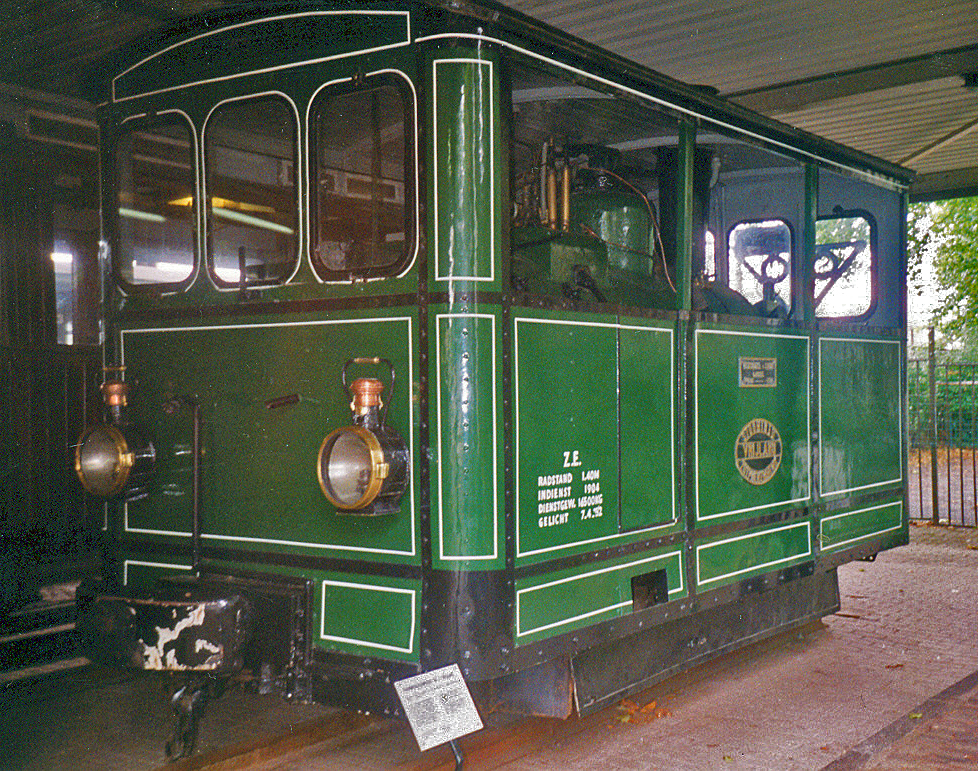
Steam tram locomotive of Geldersche Tramwegen, Netherlands

Steam tram engines, which were built, or modified, to work on a street, or roadside, tramway were almost universally also tank engines.

Tram engines had their wheels and motion enclosed to avoid accidents in traffic. They often had cow catchers to avoid road debris causing a derailment. Some tram engines were fitted with a roof and enclosed sides, giving them an appearance more like a goods wagon than a locomotive.

=== Vertical boiler locomotives ===
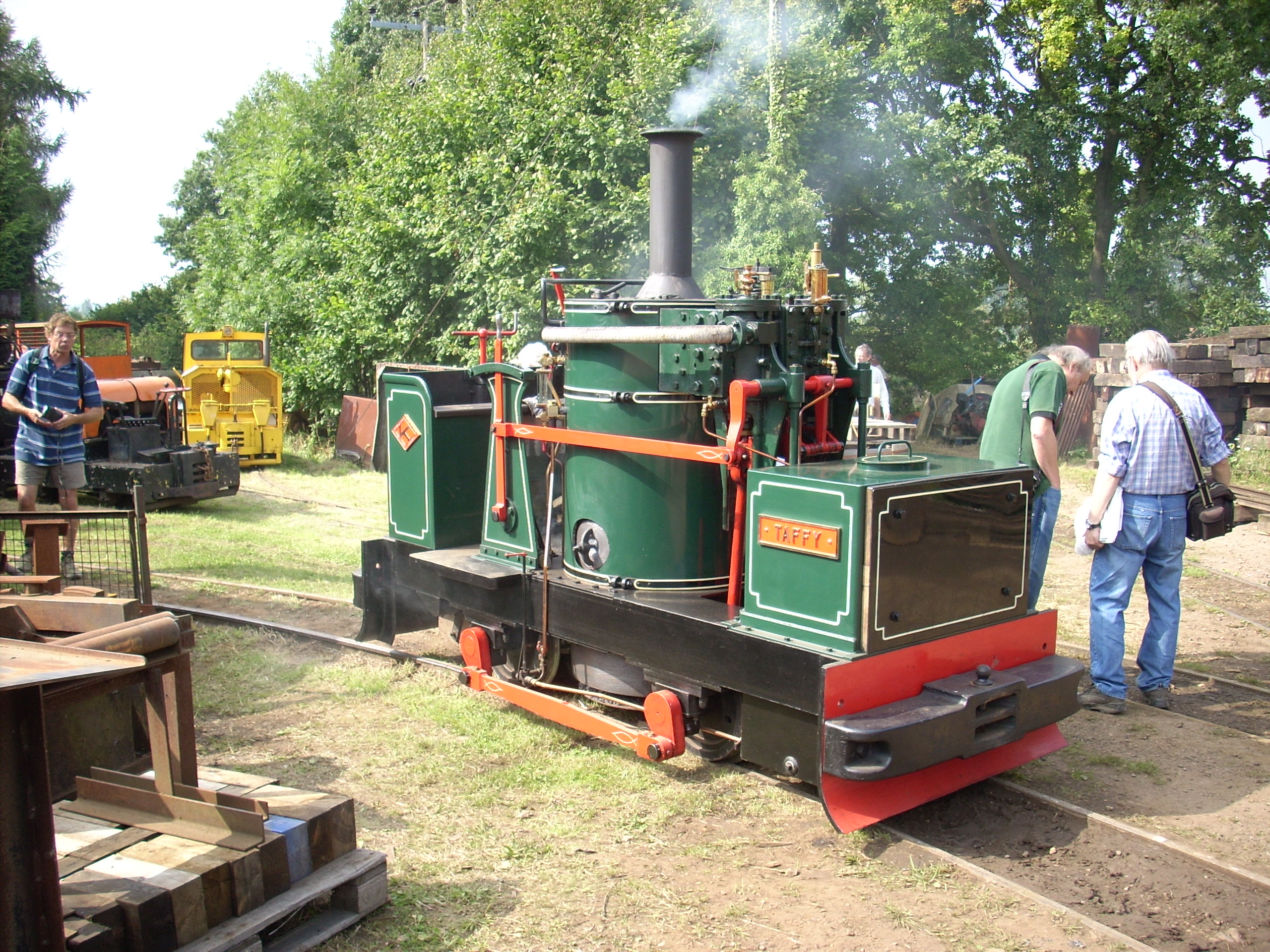
Vertical boiler locomotive Taffy

Railway locomotives with vertical boilers universally were tank locomotives. They were small, cheaper-to-operate machines mostly used in industrial settings.

== Advantages and disadvantages ==
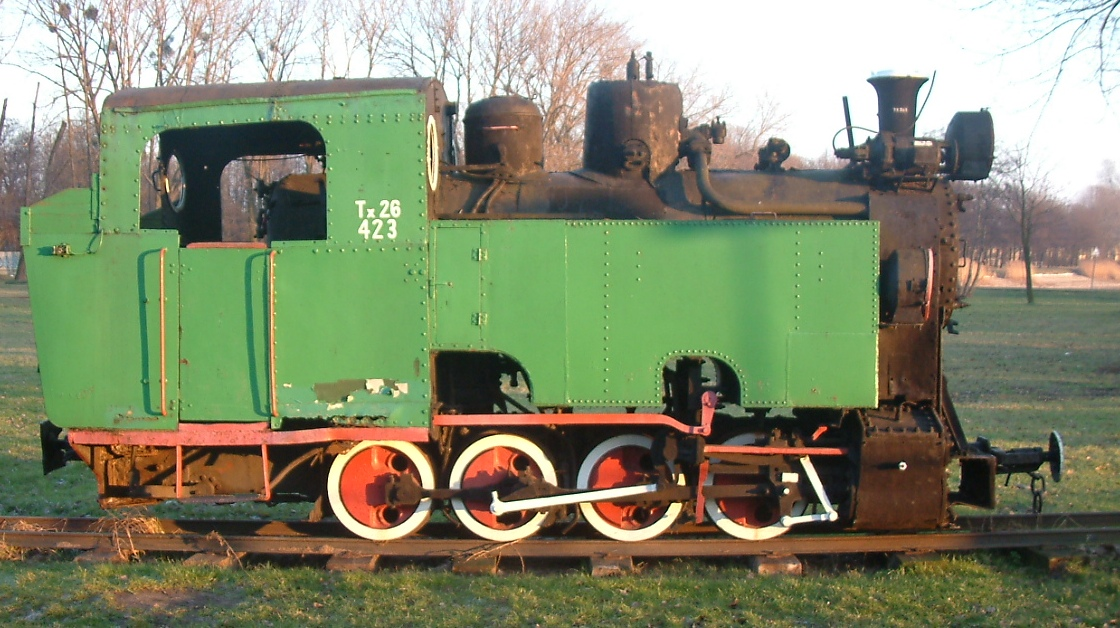
600 mm (1 ft 11 5/8 in) gauge tank locomotive Tx26-423 in Poznań, Poland

The benefits of tank locomotives include:

- Bi-directionality: Most tank locomotives are capable of running at full speed in either direction (although this depends on the wheel arrangement; for example, a 2-6-0T will not be able to run as fast in reverse, due to lack of a trailing truck). Most tender locomotives are unable to do this, because the heavy tender is not designed to be pushed and may become unstable at higher speeds. Tender locomotives generally require turning facilities, such as a turntable or wye, at each end of the run. A tank locomotive, on the other hand, can simply run around the train (provided there is a siding) and pull it back in the other direction. The crew of a tank engine generally have a better view in the reverse direction than for a tender engine and are protected from the weather.
- Fuel and water add to adhesive weight: The usable tractive weight of a locomotive is the product of the weight on its driving wheels multiplied by the factor of adhesion. Therefore, up to the limits of the maximum permissible axle loading, and other loading limits, the more weight on the driving wheels the better. In a tank locomotive the weight of its own fuel and water increase the available tractive weight.
- Compactness: A tank locomotive is shorter than the equivalent tender locomotive. This is important in environments with limited space for locomotives, such as the headshunt of a run-round loop.
- Efficiency: Many train tanks are designed to be in contact with, and be heated by, the boiler. Pre-heated water will reach boiling point faster than the colder water available from a tender. On the other hand, excessively hot water can interfere with steam injector operation and is to be avoided.

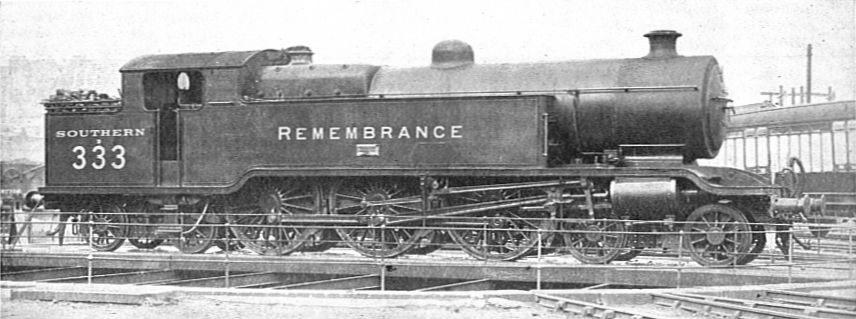
LB&SCR L class locomotives were fitted with well tanks and part of the side tanks were blanked off to improve stability.

There are disadvantages:

- Limited fuel and water capacity: A tender can typically contain far more of both than is available on a tank locomotive. This restricts the range of tank locomotives between fueling and watering points. This is one reason why tank engines were more popular in Europe and the UK than in America or other places, because the distances were shorter between refueling stations and water towers.
- Varying adhesive weight: As the water in the tanks is used up, the overall adhesive weight of the locomotive decreases, which in turn reduces the train weight the locomotive can pull. Locomotives with low water supplies also typically ride less well as there is less weight on the springs.
- Instability: Water surging inside large side tanks can cause the locomotive to become unstable and prone to derailment, as was the case with the LB&SCR L class 4-6-4T before they were modified.
- Axle loading limits: On certain lines, it is hard to put much fuel and water aboard without raising the axle loading above what the railbed can handle.
- Limit of boiler diameter: The boiler and water tanks must fit within the loading gauge of the railway being run on. Above a certain diameter of boiler there is little or no room for water tanks to be added and still fit within the loading gauge.

== Popularity ==
Worldwide, tank engines varied in popularity. They were more common in areas where the length of run was short, and a quick turn around time was needed or turning facilities were not available, mostly in Europe. With their limited fuel and water capacity, they were not favoured in areas where long runs between stops were the norm.

They were very common in the United Kingdom, France, and Germany. In the United Kingdom, they were frequently used for shunting and piloting duties, suburban passenger services and local freight. The GWR was famous for its Prairie tanks (such as the "61xx" class), used for many things, including very heavy trains on the Welsh valley coal mining lines for which the GWR 4200 Class 2-8-0T were designed. In Germany, too, large tank locomotives were built. In the United States they were used for suburban service, switching in terminals and locomotive shops, and in logging, mining and industrial service.

== See also ==
- Steam locomotive components
