= LBE Nos. 1 to 3 =

LBE 1–3 DRG Class 60
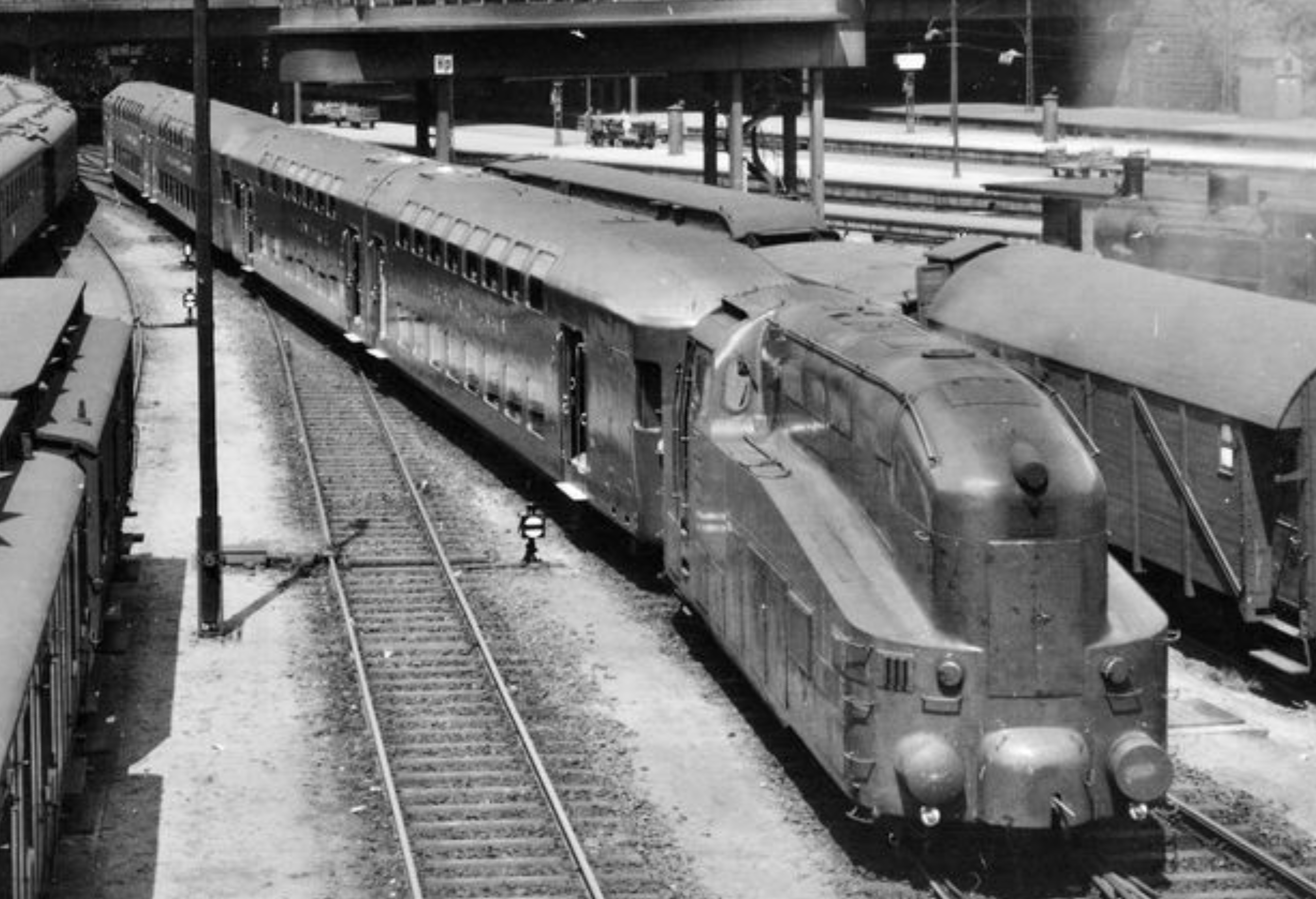
- LBE No.1 at the Hamburg Hauptbahnhof in 1936
Type and origin
- Builder: Henschel
- Build date: 1936–1937
- Total produced: 3
Specifications
- Configuration
  - Whyte: 2-4-2T
- Gauge: 1,435 mm (4 ft 8 1/2 in)
- Leading dia.: 1 m (3 ft 3 in)
- Driver dia.: 1.98 m (6 ft 6 in)
- Trailing dia.: 1 m (3 ft 3 in)
- Length
  - Over beams: 12.38 m (40.6 ft)
- Axle load: 18.3 t (18.0 long tons; 20.2 short tons)
- Adhesive weight: 36.5 t (35.9 long tons; 40.2 short tons)
- Service weight: 69.0 t (67.9 long tons; 76.1 short tons)
- Boiler pressure: 16 bar (230 psi)
- Heating surface
  - Firebox: 1.40 m^{2} (15.1 sq ft)
  - Evaporative: 75.36 m^{2} (811.2 sq ft)
- Superheater
  - Heating area: 26 m^{2} (280 sq ft)
- Cylinder size: 660 mm (26 in)
- Piston stroke: 400 mm (16 in)
Performance figures
- Maximum speed: 120 km/h (75 mph)
Career
- Numbers: DRG 60 001–003
- Retired: 1962

Locomotive numbers 1 to 3 on the Lübeck-Büchen railway (Lübeck-Büchener Eisenbahn or LBE) in Germany were streamlined tank locomotives. The locomotives had a 2-4-2T wheel arrangement, a two-cylinder, superheated engine and were capable of push-pull operations. In order to ensure a symmetrical running gear, both carrying axles were built as Bissel bogies, which were fitted with return devices for improved running.

In order to run faster passenger train services between Hamburg and Lübeck, the LBE ordered the construction of three engines in 1935 from the locomotive works of Henschel in Kassel. At the same time, the coach building firms of WUMAG in Görlitz and Linke-Hofmann in Breslau were tasked to manufacture the double-decker coaches to go with the locomotives.

Locomotives LBE 1 and 2 were delivered in 1936; LBE 3, which with its larger water tank and boiler appeared somewhat heavier, followed one year later. The engines had a top speed of 120 km/h (75 mph) and were used in push-pull services. Due to their appearance and grey livery they were soon nicknamed "Micky Mouse".

On the nationalisation of the LBE on 1 January 1938 the locomotives were incorporated into the Reichsbahn's numbering scheme as DRG Class 60 with numbers 60 001 to 60 003 and homed in Lübeck locomotive depot (Bahnbetriebswerk) in Reichsbahndirektion Schwerin. Nevertheless, their duties did not change until the outbreak of war in 1939 when express services were withdrawn and the three engines were to be retired.

There were attempts to sell the engines to the Frankfurt-Königstein railway, but these locomotives were designed for express services on the north German plain and not for the Königsteiner Bahn, which had very steep sections. During the trial only two of the 14 wagons attached at Frankfurt-Höchst arrived at Königstein, the rest had to be uncoupled en route.

Number 60 001 was used as a heating engine and went missing during the war. The other two ended up in the Deutsche Reichsbahn in the GDR. Number 60 002 worked in the area of Berlin until 1958 and was scrapped in 1962 at Leipzig. Number 60 003 remained in service until 1954 at Stralsund locomotive depot.
