= Kurima (disambiguation) =

Kurima is a village in Slovakia.

Kurima may also refer to:

== Places ==
- Kurima-jima, an island of Japan
- Kurima Valley, Western New Guinea
- Kurima, Yahukimo, a village in the Highland Papua

== Linguistics ==
- Kurima language, a dialect of Grand Valley Dani language of New Guinea
- Kurima language (Japan), a South Ryukyuan language of Japan
