= Shimakutuba Orthography =

The Shimakutuba Orthography (しまくとぅば正書法, Shimakutuba Seishohō) is a set of rules established by Okinawa Prefecture that prescribes the orthography of the Ryukyuan languages spoken in various regions of Okinawa Prefecture using katakana characters.

== Overview ==
The term shimakutuba (literally "island speech"), as used by Okinawa Prefecture, refers to the Ryukyuan languages spoken within Okinawa Prefecture. Accordingly, the Shimakutuba Orthography does not cover the Ryukyuan languages spoken in Kagoshima Prefecture to the north, such as the Amami language and the dialects of Yoron, Okinoerabu, and Kikai Islands, which belong to the Kunigami language. Furthermore, even among the speech varieties used within Okinawa Prefecture, it excludes Okinawan Japanese as well as the languages of the Daitō Islands (a subgroup of the Hachijō dialect of Japanese), which do not belong to the Ryukyuan language family.

Since it has been officially promulgated by Okinawa Prefecture, this orthography can be regarded as the closest to an official orthography for the Ryukyuan languages. However, at present, it cannot be said that the system has been widely adopted by the general public. Okinawa Prefecture has stated that this orthography is intended for use in initiatives to promote and pass on shimakutuba and that it "does not deny the writing systems that have been used by various regions and researchers up to now".

In 2018, Okinawa Prefecture established the Shimakutuba Orthography Review Committee (しまくとぅば正書法検討委員会, Shimakutuba Seishohō Kentō Iinkai), composed of scholars and other experts, which finalized the orthography of shimakutuba in March 2022. Following UNESCO's classification, official orthographies were created for the Kunigami, Okinawan, Miyako, Yaeyama, and Yonaguni languages. Furthermore, in cases where individual dialects within these languages contained unique phonemes, the orthography was designed to accommodate them. In addition, the Reference Table 1 (参考第1表, Sankō Dai-Ippyō) was established, providing a unified orthography that allows for the simultaneous distinction of all phonemes across the five languages (including their dialects).

The primary purpose of this orthography is to be used in teaching shimakutuba to children in Okinawa. Since most children in modern Okinawa grow up with Japanese as their first language, the orthography was developed on the basis of modern Japanese katakana notation to make it easier for them to understand and learn.

For this reason, there are aspects of the system that are somewhat less rational from a phonological perspective of the Ryukyuan languages. For example, in traditional writing methods of the Ryukyuan languages, the character "ヲ" was often used to represent [wo]. However, since "ヲ" in modern Japanese is used only for the particle [o], the Shimakutuba Orthography instead uses "ウォ" to represent [wo], in the same way that modern Japanese orthography uses it for foreign loanwords.

At the same time, where independent writing systems have already been developed by local communities, the Shimakutuba Orthography has partially incorporated them. For instance, in the privately developed Miyako Gana (宮古仮名) used in the Miyako Islands, the notation "イ゚" is employed, as in the Ōgami Island dialect word トゥイ゚ ("bird") [tuɿ][tuï][tuɨ]. This notation has been adopted into the Shimakutuba Orthography as well.

== Use of katakana ==
In this orthography, only katakana is used. The reason given is that "katakana is superior in phonetic representation compared to hiragana, which contains many exceptional spellings".

The "many exceptional spellings" refers to examples in modern Japanese orthography such as: the sequence "おう", which may be pronounced either [oː] or [oɯ] depending on the word; "えい", which may be pronounced either [eː] or [ei]; and "は" [ha] and "へ" [he], which, when used as particles, are pronounced [wa] and [e], respectively. (Strictly speaking, however, these irregularities are issues with the spelling of words other than loanwords (native Japanese words and Sino-Japanese words). Since these vocabularies are now normally spelt in hiragana rather than katakana, these irregularities appear to be a problem of hiragana.)

The Shimakutuba Orthography also does not employ kanji. As noted earlier, one of the main purposes of this system is education for local children. Since many children have not yet mastered the use of kanji in Japanese, requiring them to learn kanji in another language would impose an additional burden. Moreover, as in Japanese, traditional writing systems of the Ryukyuan languages use both on'yomi (Sino-Ryukyuan readings) and kun'yomi (native readings) of kanji. Furthermore, for example, while the Okinawan word for "beautiful island" is written as "美ら島", it can be read differently depending on the dialect—as [kuɾaʃima], [suɾaʃima], [tsuɾaʃima], [tʃuɾaʃima], or [kjuɾaʃima]. Without the aid of furigana, it will be extremely difficult to know the reading of kanji in Ryukyuan.

That said, while Okinawa Prefecture has only adopted katakana for the Shimakutuba Orthography, it has also stated that "this does not deny the use of writing systems employing hiragana or mixed kanji and kana". On the other hand, the Okinawan civic group Uchināguchi Kai (うちなーぐち会) has repeatedly protested against the prefecture, arguing that the Okinawan language should not be written in katakana, but rather in the traditional mixed script of kanji and hiragana.

== Tables ==
The following table shows the notation for each language in the Shimakutuba Orthography, based on the information provided by Okinawa Prefecture.

=== Notes ===
In the Shimakutuba Orthography, certain superscript katakana characters are used. However, since these characters are still in the process of being submitted to Unicode and have not yet been implemented, they are represented in the following tables using tags as a substitute. Moreover, the orthography does not prescribe vertical writing, so it remains unclear how these superscript characters would be represented in vertical text.

In the tables below, cases where kana notation is shown on two lines (for example, "ˀカ" and "^{ツ}カ") indicate that either form of notation is acceptable.

Within the Ryukyuan languages—particularly in Kunigami and Okinawan—there are two distinct types of syllables (morae) involving vowels alone and the hatsuon (moraic nasal). For syllables consisting of a glottal stop plus a vowel, such as [ˀa], the glottal stop occurs only at the beginning of a word; in medial or final positions, the glottal stop is dropped and only the vowel [a] remains. In the Ryukyuan languages, this is regarded as the standard vowel syllable, while a vowel beginning without a glottal stop in word-initial position is distinguished as a "gradual beginning" (緩やかな声立て, yuruyaka na koetate). Accordingly, the Shimakutuba Orthography differentiates between these two types at word-initial position.

A similar distinction applies to the hatsuon (moraic nasal). In this case, the orthography distinguishes between three contexts: (1) word-initial without a glottal stop ("gradual beginning"), (2) word-initial with a glottal stop, and (3) word-medial or word-final position. With respect to the "gradual beginning", the regulations note that "there is also a convention unique to the Ryukyuan languages of marking this with an apostrophe placed at the upper left of the vowel character".

It is also noted that the Shimakutuba Orthography does not prescribe any rules for romanization.

=== Kunigami language ===
		a	i	u	e	o	ja	ju	jo	wa	wi	we
ˀ∅		ア	イ	ウ	エ	オ						
ˀ∅	Initial (Note: At the beginning of a word.)	[ˀa]	[ˀi]	[ˀu]	[ˀe]	[ˀo]						
ˀ∅	Else (Note: In medial or final positions of a word.)	[a]	[i]	[u]	[e]	[o]						
∅		ʼア^{ア}ア	ʼイ^{イ}イ	ʼウ^{ウ}ウ	ʼエ^{エ}エ	ʼオ^{オ}オ						
∅	Initial	ʼa [a]	ʼi [i][ji]	ʼu [u][wu]	ʼe [e]	ʼo [o]						
∅	Else	Not used										
k		カ [ka]	キ [ki]	ク [ku]	ケ [ke]	コ [ko]	キャ [kja]	キュ [kju]	キョ [kjo]	クヮ [kwa]	クィ [kwi]	クェ [kwe]
ˀk		ˀカ^{ツ}カ [ˀka]	ˀキ^{ツ}キ [ˀki]	ˀク^{ツ}ク [ˀku]	ˀケ^{ツ}ケ [ˀke]	ˀコ^{ツ}コ [ˀko]				ˀクヮ^{ツ}クヮ [ˀkwa]	ˀクィ^{ツ}クィ [ˀkwi]	ˀクェ^{ツ}クェ [ˀkwe]
ɡ		ガ [ɡa]	ギ [ɡi]	グ [ɡu]	ゲ [ɡe]	ゴ [ɡo]	ギャ [ɡja]	ギュ [ɡju]	ギョ [ɡjo]	グヮ [ɡwa]	グィ [ɡwi]	グェ [ɡwe]
s		サ [sa]	スィ [si]	ス [su]	セ [se]	ソ [so]						
ʃ		シャ [ʃa]	シ [ʃi]	シュ [ʃu]	シェ [ʃe]	ショ [ʃo]						
θ		サ゚ [θa]	スィ゚ (Note: The original table indeed shows スィ゚, not ス゚ィ.) [θi]	ス゚ [θu]	セ゚ [θe]	ソ゚ [θo]						
dz		ザ [dza]	ズィ [dzi]	ズ [dzu]	ゼ [dze]	ゾ [dzo]						
dʒ		ジャ [dʒa]	ジ [dʒi]	ジュ [dʒu]	ジェ [dʒe]	ジョ [dʒo]						
t		タ [ta]	ティ [ti]	トゥ [tu]	テ [te]	ト [to]						
ˀt		ˀタ^{ツ}タ [ˀta]	ˀティ^{ツ}ティ [ˀti]	ˀトゥ^{ツ}トゥ [ˀtu]	ˀテ^{ツ}テ [ˀte]	ˀト^{ツ}ト [ˀto]	ˀテャ^{ツ}テャ [ˀtja]	ˀテュ^{ツ}テュ [ˀtju]	ˀテョ^{ツ}テョ [ˀtjo]			
d		ダ [da]	ディ [di]	ドゥ [du]	デ [de]	ド [do]	デャ [dja]	デュ [dju]	デョ [djo]			
ts		ツァ [tsa]	ツィ [tsi]	ツ [tsu]	ツェ [tse]	ツォ [tso]						
ˀts		ˀツァ^{ツ}ツァ [ˀtsa]	ˀツィ^{ツ}ツィ [ˀtsi]	ˀツ^{ツ}ツ [ˀtsu]	ˀツェ^{ツ}ツェ [ˀtse]	ˀツォ^{ツ}ツォ [ˀtso]						
tʃ		チャ [tʃa]	チ [tʃi]	チュ [tʃu]	チェ [tʃe]	チョ [tʃo]						
ˀtʃ		ˀチャ^{ツ}チャ [ˀtʃa]	ˀチ^{ツ}チ [ˀtʃi]	ˀチュ^{ツ}チュ [ˀtʃu]	ˀチェ^{ツ}チェ [ˀtʃe]	ˀチョ^{ツ}チョ [ˀtʃo]						
n		ナ [na]	ニ [ɲi]	ヌ [nu]	ネ [ne]	ノ [no]	ニャ [ɲa]	ニュ [ɲu]	ニョ [ɲo]			
ˀn		ˀナ^{ツ}ナ [ˀna]	ˀニ^{ツ}ニ [ˀɲi]	ˀヌ^{ツ}ヌ [ˀnu]	ˀネ^{ツ}ネ [ˀne]	ˀノ^{ツ}ノ [ˀno]	ˀニャ^{ツ}ニャ [ˀɲa]	ˀニュ^{ツ}ニュ [ˀɲu]	ˀニョ^{ツ}ニョ [ˀɲo]			
h		ハ [ha]		フゥ [hu]	ヘ [he]	ホ [ho]						
ç		ヒャ [ça]	ヒ [çi]	ヒュ [çu]		ヒョ [ço]						
ɸ		ファ [ɸa]	フィ [ɸi]	フ [ɸu]	フェ [ɸe]	フォ [ɸo]						
p		パ [pa]	ピ [pi]	プ [pu]	ペ [pe]	ポ [po]	ピャ [pja]	ピュ [pju]	ピョ [pjo]			
ˀp		ˀパ^{ツ}パ [ˀpa]	ˀピ^{ツ}ピ [ˀpi]	ˀプ^{ツ}プ [ˀpu]	ˀペ^{ツ}ペ [ˀpe]	ˀポ^{ツ}ポ [ˀpo]	ˀピャ^{ツ}ピャ [ˀpja]	ˀピュ^{ツ}ピュ [ˀpju]	ˀピョ^{ツ}ピョ [ˀpjo]			
b		バ [ba]	ビ [bi]	ブ [bu]	ベ [be]	ボ [bo]	ビャ [bja]	ビュ [bju]	ビョ [bjo]			
m		マ [ma]	ミ [mi]	ム [mu]	メ [me]	モ [mo]	ミャ [mja]	ミュ [mju]	ミョ [mjo]			
ˀm		ˀマ^{ツ}マ [ˀma]	ˀミ^{ツ}ミ [ˀmi]	ˀム^{ツ}ム [ˀmu]	ˀメ^{ツ}メ [ˀme]	ˀモ^{ツ}モ [ˀmo]	ˀミャ^{ツ}ミャ [ˀmja]	ˀミュ^{ツ}ミュ [ˀmju]	ˀミョ^{ツ}ミョ [ˀmjo]			
j		ヤ [ja]		ユ [ju]	イェ [je]	ヨ [jo]						
ˀj		ˀヤ^{ツ}ヤ [ˀja]		ˀユ^{ツ}ユ [ˀju]	ˀイェ^{ツ}イェ [ˀje]	ˀヨ^{ツ}ヨ [ˀjo]						
ɾ		ラ [ɾa]	リ [ɾi]	ル [ɾu]	レ [ɾe]	ロ [ɾo]	リャ [ɾja]	リュ [ɾju]	リョ [ɾjo]			
ˀɾ		ˀラ^{ツ}ラ [ˀɾa]	ˀリ^{ツ}リ [ˀɾi]									
w		ワ [wa]	ウィ [wi]		ウェ [we]	ウォ [wo]						
ˀw		ˀワ^{ツ}ワ [ˀwa]	ˀウィ^{ツ}ウィ [ˀwi]		ˀウェ^{ツ}ウェ [ˀwe]							

Chōon (long vowel)		ー
Sokuon (geminated consonant)		ッ
Hatsuon (moraic nasal)	Initial	ʼン, ^{ン}ン ʼn, ʼm, ʼɲ, ʼŋ, ʼɴ [n-, m-, ɲ-, ŋ-, ɴ]
Hatsuon (moraic nasal)	Initial	ˀン，^{ツ}ン [ˀn, ˀm, ˀɲ, ˀŋ, ˀɴ]
Hatsuon (moraic nasal)	Else	ン [-n, -m, -ɲ, -ŋ, -ɴ]

=== Okinawan language ===
		a	i	u	e	o	ja	ju	jo	wa	wi	we
ˀ∅		ア	イ	ウ	エ	オ						
ˀ∅	Initial	[ˀa]	[ˀi]	[ˀu]	[ˀe]	[ˀo]						
ˀ∅	Else	[a]	[i]	[u]	[e]	[o]						
∅		ʼア^{ア}ア	ʼイ^{イ}イ	ʼウ^{ウ}ウ	ʼエ^{エ}エ	ʼオ^{オ}オ						
∅	Initial	ʼa [a]	ʼi [i][ji]	ʼu [u][wu]	ʼe [e]	ʼo [o]						
∅	Else	Not used										
k		カ [ka]	キ [ki]	ク [ku]	ケ [ke]	コ [ko]	キャ [kja]	キュ [kju]	キョ [kjo]	クヮ [kwa]	クィ [kwi]	クェ [kwe]
ɡ		ガ [ɡa]	ギ [ɡi]	グ [ɡu]	ゲ [ɡe]	ゴ [ɡo]	ギャ [ɡja]	ギュ [ɡju]	ギョ [ɡjo]	グヮ [ɡwa]	グィ [ɡwi]	グェ [ɡwe]
s		サ [sa]	スィ [si]	ス [su]	セ [se]	ソ [so]						
ʃ		シャ [ʃa]	シ [ʃi]	シュ [ʃu]	シェ [ʃe]	ショ [ʃo]						
dz		ザ [dza]	ズィ [dzi]	ズ [dzu]	ゼ [dze]	ゾ [dzo]						
dʒ		ジャ [dʒa]	ジ [dʒi]	ジュ [dʒu]	ジェ [dʒe]	ジョ [dʒo]						
t		タ [ta]	ティ [ti]	トゥ [tu]	テ [te]	ト [to]						
d		ダ [da]	ディ [di]	ドゥ [du]	デ [de]	ド [do]						
ts		ツァ [tsa]	ツィ [tsi]	ツ [tsu]	ツェ [tse]	ツォ [tso]						
tʃ		チャ [tʃa]	チ [tʃi]	チュ [tʃu]	チェ [tʃe]	チョ [tʃo]						
n		ナ [na]	ニ [ɲi]	ヌ [nu]	ネ [ne]	ノ [no]						
ɲ		ニャ [ɲa]		ニュ [ɲu]	ニェ [ɲe]	ニョ [ɲo]						
h		ハ [ha]			ヘ [he]	ホ [ho]						
ç		ヒャ [ça]	ヒ [çi]	ヒュ [çu]		ヒョ [ço]						
ɸ		ファ [ɸa]	フィ [ɸi]	フ [ɸu]	フェ [ɸe]	フォ [ɸo]						
p		パ [pa]	ピ [pi]	プ [pu]	ペ [pe]	ポ [po]	ピャ [pja]	ピュ [pju]	ピョ [pjo]			
b		バ [ba]	ビ [bi]	ブ [bu]	ベ [be]	ボ [bo]	ビャ [bja]	ビュ [bju]	ビョ [bjo]			
m		マ [ma]	ミ [mi]	ム [mu]	メ [me]	モ [mo]	ミャ [mja]	ミュ [mju]	ミョ [mjo]			
j		ヤ [ja]		ユ [ju]	イェ [je]	ヨ [jo]						
ˀj		ˀヤ^{ツ}ヤ [ˀja]		ˀユ^{ツ}ユ [ˀju]	ˀイェ^{ツ}イェ [ˀje]	ˀヨ^{ツ}ヨ [ˀjo]						
ɾ		ラ [ɾa]	リ [ɾi]	ル [ɾu]	レ [ɾe]	ロ [ɾo]	リャ [ɾja]	リュ [ɾju]	リョ [ɾjo]			
ˀɾ		ˀラ^{ツ}ラ [ˀɾa]	ˀリ^{ツ}リ [ˀɾi]									
w		ワ [wa]	ウィ [wi]		ウェ [we]	ウォ [wo]						
ˀw		ˀワ^{ツ}ワ [ˀwa]	ˀウィ^{ツ}ウィ [ˀwi]		ˀウェ^{ツ}ウェ [ˀwe]							

Chōon (long vowel)		ー
Sokuon (geminated consonant)		ッ
Hatsuon (moraic nasal)	Initial	ʼン, ^{ン}ン ʼn, ʼm, ʼɲ, ʼŋ, ʼɴ [n-, m-, ɲ-, ŋ-, ɴ]
Hatsuon (moraic nasal)	Initial	ˀン，^{ツ}ン [ˀn, ˀm, ˀɲ, ˀŋ, ˀɴ]
Hatsuon (moraic nasal)	Else	ン [-n, -m, -ɲ, -ŋ, -ɴ]

==== Auxiliary symbols ====
Vowel reduction	ン̥ [n˳], etc.
Nasal vowel	イ̃ [ĩ], ウ̃ [ũ], etc.
Glottal stop	ˀパ/^{ツ}パ [ˀpa], ˀタ/^{ツ}タ [ˀta], ˀメ/^{ツ}メ [ˀme], etc.
Nasalization	ヒ̃ [hĩ], etc.

=== Miyako language ===
		a	i	u	e	o	ɿ	ja	ju	jo	wa
ˀ∅		ア	イ	ウ	エ	オ	イ゚				
ˀ∅	Initial	[ˀa]	[ˀi]	[ˀu]	[ˀe]	[ˀo]	[z][^{z}ï][ɿ][ɨ][ï]				
ˀ∅	Else	[a]	[i]	[u]	[e]	[o]	[z][^{z}ï][ɿ][ɨ][ï]				
k		カ [ka]	キ [ki]	ク [ku][kɷ]	ケ [ke]	コ [ko]	クㇲ [ks][k^{s}ï][kɿ][kɨ]	キャ [kja]	キュ [kju]	キョ [kjo]	クヮ [kwa]
ɡ		ガ [ɡa]	ギ [ɡi]	グ [ɡu][ɡɷ]	ゲ [ɡe]	ゴ [ɡo]	グㇲ゙ [ɡz][ɡ^{z}ï][ɡɨ]	ギャ [ɡja]	ギュ [ɡju]	ギョ [ɡjo]	グヮ [ɡwa]
s		サ [sa]		スゥ [su]	セ [se]	ソ [so]	ス [s][sɿ][sï][sɨ]				
ʃ		シャ [ʃa]	シ [ʃi]	シュ [ʃu]	シェ [ʃe]	ショ [ʃo]					
dz		ザ [dza]		ズゥ [dzu]	ゼ [dze]	ゾ [dzo]	ズ [dz][dzɿ][dzï][dzɨ]				
dʒ		ジャ [dʒa]	ジ [dʒi]	ジュ [dʒu]	ジェ [dʒe]	ジョ [dʒo]					
z		サ゚ [za]		ス゚ゥ [zu]	セ゚ [ze]	ソ゚ [zo]	ス゚ [z][zɿ][zï][zɨ]				
ʒ		シ゚ャ [ʒa]	シ゚ [ʒi]	シ゚ュ [ʒu]		シ゚ョ [ʒo]					
t		タ [ta]	ティ [ti]	トゥ [tu]	テ [te]	ト [to]		テャ [tja]	テュ [tju]	テョ [tjo]	
d		ダ [da]	ディ [di]	ドゥ [du]	デ [de]	ド [do]		デャ [dja]	デュ [dju]	デョ [djo]	
ts		ツァ [tsa]		ツゥ [tsu]		ツォ [tso]	ツ [ts][tsɿ][tsï][tsɨ]				
tʃ		チャ [tʃa]	チ [tʃi]	チュ [tʃu]	チェ [tʃe]	チョ [tʃo]					
n		ナ [na]	ニ [ɲi]	ヌ [nu]	ネ [ne]	ノ [no]		ニャ [ɲa]	ニュ [ɲu]	ニョ [ɲo]	
f		ファ [fa]	フィ [fi]	フゥ [fu]	フェ [fe]	フォ [fo]		フャ [fja]	フュ [fju]	フョ [fjo]	
h		ハ [ha]	ヒ [hi]	ホゥ [hu]							
p		パ [pa]	ピ [pi]	プ [pu]	ペ [pe]	ポ [po]	プㇲ [ps][p^{s}ï][pɿ][pɨ]	ピャ [pja]	ピュ [pju]	ピョ [pjo]	
b		バ [ba]	ビ [bi]	ブ [bu]	ベ [be]	ボ [bo]	ブㇲ゙ [bz][b^{z}ї][bɿ] [bɨ]	ビャ [bja]	ビュ [bju]	ビョ [bjo]	
v		ヴァ [va]	ヴィ [vi]	ヴゥ [vu]	ヴェ [ve]	ヴォ [vo]		ヴャ [vja]	ヴュ [vju]		
m		マ [ma]	ミ [mi]	ム [mu]	メ [me]	モ [mo]	ムㇲ゙ [mz][m^{z}ї][mɿ][mɨ]	ミャ [mja]	ミュ [mju]	ミョ [mjo]	
j		ヤ [ja]		ユ [ju]		ヨ [jo]					
ɾ		ラ [ɾa]	リ [ɾi]	ル [ɾu]	レ [ɾe]	ロ [ɾo]		リャ [ɾja]	リュ [ɾju]	リョ [ɾjo]	
w		ワ [wa][ʋa]									

Chōon (long vowel)	ー
Sokuon (geminated consonant)	ッ
Hatsuon (moraic nasal)	ン [n, m, ŋ, ɴ]

Syllabic consonant (Ōgami Is., Irabu Is.)	クㇷ [kf], ムㇽ [ml], プㇽ [pl], ブㇽ [bl]
Isolated consonant	ン [n], フ [f], ヴ [v], ム゚ [m], リ゚/ル゚ [l]
Front semi-open vowel (Ōgami Is.)	ケェ [kɛ], ペェ [pɛ]
Vowel reduction (Ikema Is., Nishihara in Miyako Is., Sarahama in Irabu Is.)	ン̥ [n˳][m˳]

=== Yaeyama language ===
		a	i	u	e	o	ɿ	ɛ	ja	ju	jo	wa
ˀ∅		ア	イ	ウ	エ	オ	イ゚	エ゚				
ˀ∅	Initial	[ˀa]	[ˀi]	[ˀu]	[ˀe]	[ˀo]	[ɿ] [ï][ɨ]	[ɛ] [ë]				
ˀ∅	Else	[a]	[i]	[u]	[e]	[o]	[ɿ] [ï][ɨ]	[ɛ] [ë]				
k		カ [ka]	キ [ki]	ク [ku]	ケ [ke]	コ [ko]	キィ [kɿ] [kï][kɨ]	ケェ [kɛ][kë]	キャ [kja]	キュ [kju]	キョ [kjo]	クヮ [kwa]
ɡ		ガ [ɡa]	ギ [ɡi]	グ [ɡu]	ゲ [ɡe]	ゴ [ɡo]	ギィ [ɡɿ] [ɡï][ɡɨ]	ゲェ [ɡɛ][ɡë]	ギャ [ɡja]	ギュ [ɡju]	ギョ [ɡjo]	グヮ [ɡwa]
s		サ [sa]		ス [su]	セ [se]	ソ [so]	シィ [sɿ] [sï][sɨ]	スェ゚ [sɛ] [së]				スァ [swa]
ʃ		シャ [ʃa]	シ [ʃi]	シュ [ʃu]		ショ [ʃo]						シュァ [ʃwa]
dz		ザ [dza]		ズ [dzu]	ゼ [dze]	ゾ [dzo]	ジィ [dzɿ][dzï][dzɨ]	ズェ゚ [dzɛ][dzë]				
dʒ		ジャ [dʒa]	ジ [dʒi]	ジュ [dʒu]		ジョ [dʒo]						ジュァ [dʒwa]
t		タ [ta]	ティ [ti]	トゥ [tu]	テ [te]	ト [to]			テャ [tja]	テュ [tju]	テョ [tjo]	トァ [twa]
d		ダ [da]	ディ [di]	ドゥ [du]	デ [de]	ド [do]			デャ [dja]	デュ [dju]	デョ [djo]	ドァ [dwa]
ts		ツァ [tsa]		ツ [tsu]	ツェ [tse]	ツォ [tso]	チィ [tsɿ][tsï][tsɨ]	ツェ゚ [tsɛ][tsë]				
tʃ		チャ [tʃa]	チ [tʃi]	チュ [tʃu]	チェ [tʃe]	チョ [tʃo]						
n		ナ [na]	ニ [ɲi]	ヌ [nu]	ネ [ne]	ノ [no]	ニィ [nɿ][nɨ][nï]	ネェ [nɛ][në]	ニャ [ɲa]	ニュ [ɲu]	ニョ [ɲo]	ヌァ [nwa]
h		ハ [ha]			ヘ [he]	ホ [ho]						
ç		ヒャ [ça]	ヒ [çi]	ヒュ [çu] (Note: In the original table, [çu] and [ço] are written as [ça]—this appears to be a typographical error.)		ヒョ [ço]						
ɸ		ファ [ɸa][fa]	フィ [ɸi][fi]	フ [ɸu][fu]	フェ [ɸe][fe]	フォ [ɸo][fo]						
p		パ [pa]	ピ [pi]	プ [pu]	ペ [pe]	ポ [po]	ピィ [pɿ][pï][pɨ]	ペェ [pɛ][pë]	ピャ [pja]	ピュ [pju]	ピョ [pjo]	
b		バ [ba]	ビ [bi]	ブ [bu]	ベ [be]	ボ [bo]	ビィ [bɿ][bï][bɨ]	ベェ [bɛ][bë]	ビャ [bja]	ビュ [bju]	ビョ [bjo]	ブァ [bwa]
v		ヴァ [va]	ヴィ [vi]	ヴ [vu]	ヴェ [ve]	ヴォ [vo]						
m		マ [ma]	ミ [mi]	ム [mu]	メ [me]	モ [mo]	ミィ [mɿ][mï][mɨ]	メェ [mɛ][më]	ミャ [mja]	ミュ [mju]	ミョ [mjo]	ムァ [mwa]
j		ヤ [ja]		ユ [ju]	イェ [je]	ヨ [jo]						
ɾ		ラ [ɾa]	リ [ɾi]	ル [ɾu]	レ [ɾe]	ロ [ɾo]	リィ [ɾɿ][ɾï][ɾɨ]	レェ [ɾɛ][ɾë]	リャ [ɾja]	リュ [ɾju]	リョ [ɾjo]	
w		ワ [wa]	ウィ [wi]		ウェ [we]	ウォ [wo]						

Chōon (long vowel)	ー
Sokuon (geminated consonant)	ッ
Hatsuon (moraic nasal)	ン [m, n, ɲ, ŋ, ɴ]
Isolated consonant (Kuroshima Is., Shimoji in Aragusuku Is.)	ル゚ [r]

==== Auxiliary symbols ====
Vowel reduction	(Hateruma Is., Shiraho in Ishigaki Is.)	カ̥ [ka˳] , キ̥ [ki˳], ク̥ [ku˳], キィ̥ [kɿ˳][kɨ˳], サ̥ [sa˳], シ̥ [ʃi˳], ス̥ [su˳], タ̥ [ta˳], ティ̥ [ti˳], トゥ̥ [tu˳], チ̥ [tʃi˳], ツ̥ [tsu˳], チィ̥ [tsɿ˳][tsɨ˳], ナ̥ [na˳], ニ̥ [ni˳], ニィ̥ [nɿ˳][nɨ˳], パ̥ [pa˳], ピ̥ [pi˳], ピィ̥ [pɿ˳][pɨ˳], マ̥ [ma˳], ミ̥ [mi˳], ミィ̥ [mɿ˳][mɨ˳], ラ̥ [ɾa ˳], リ̥ [ɾi ˳], リィ̥ [ɾɿ ˳][ɾɨ˳], ン̥ [n˳][m˳]
Vowel reduction	(Taketomi Is.)	ヒ̥ [çi˳], フ̥ [ɸu˳]
Nasal vowel (Taketomi Is.)		ア̃ [ã], イ̃ [ĩ], ウ̃ [ũ], エ̃ [ẽ], オ̃ [õ]
Nasalization		ン̃ [ñ][ɿ̃]
Open vowel (Taketomi Is.)		アァ [a] (Note: In the Taketomi Is. dialect, "ア" is pronounced [ə].)

=== Yonaguni language ===
		a	i	u	e	o	ja	ju	jo	wa
ˀ∅		ア	イ	ウ	エ	オ				
ˀ∅	Initial	[ˀa]	[ˀi]	[ˀu]	[ˀe]	[ˀo]				
ˀ∅	Else	[a]	[i]	[u]	[e]	[o]				
k		カ [ka]	キ [ki]	ク [ku]	ケ [ke]	コ [ko]	キャ [kja]	キュ [kju]	キョ [kjo]	クヮ [kwa]
ˀk		ˀカ^{ツ}カ [ˀka]	ˀキ^{ツ}キ [ˀki]	ˀク^{ツ}ク [ˀku]	ˀケ^{ツ}ケ [ˀke]	ˀコ^{ツ}コ [ˀko]	ˀキャ^{ツ}キャ [ˀkja]	ˀキュ^{ツ}キュ [ˀkju]	ˀキョ^{ツ}キョ [ˀkjo]	ˀクヮ^{ツ}クヮ [ˀkwa]
ɡ		ガ [ɡa]	ギ [ɡi]	グ [ɡu]	ゲ [ɡe]	ゴ [ɡo]	ギャ [ɡja]	ギュ [ɡju]	ギョ [ɡjo]	グヮ [ɡwa]
ŋ		カ゚ [ŋa]	キ゚ [ŋi]	ク゚ [ŋu]	ケ゚ [ŋe]	コ゚ [ŋo]	キ゚ャ [ŋja]	キ゚ュ [ŋju]	キ゚ョ [ŋjo]	ク゚ヮ [ŋwa]
s		サ [sa]		ス [su]	セ [se]	ソ [so]				スァ [swa]
ʃ		シャ [ʃa]	シ [ʃi]	シュ [ʃu]		ショ [ʃo]				
dz		ザ [dza]		ズ [dzu]	ゼ [dze]	ゾ [dzo]				ズァ [dzwa]
dʒ		ジャ [dʒa]	ジ [dʒi]	ジュ [dʒu]		ジョ [dʒo]				
t		タ [ta]	ティ [ti]	トゥ [tu]	テ [te]	ト [to]	テャ [tja]	テュ [tju]	テョ [tjo]	トァ [twa]
ˀt		ˀタ^{ツ}タ [ˀta]	ˀティ^{ツ}ティ [ˀti]	ˀトゥ^{ツ}トゥ [ˀtu]	ˀテ^{ツ}テ [ˀte]	ˀト^{ツ}ト [ˀto]	ˀテャ^{ツ}テャ [ˀtja]	ˀテュ^{ツ}テュ [ˀtju]	ˀテョ^{ツ}テョ [ˀtjo]	ˀトァ^{ツ}トァ [ˀtwa]
d		ダ [da]	ディ [di]	ドゥ [du]	デ [de]	ド [do]	デャ [dja]	デュ [dju]	デョ [djo]	ドァ [dwa]
ts		ツァ [tsa]		ツ [tsu]	ツェ [tse]	ツォ [tso]				ツヮ [tswa]
tʃ		チャ [tʃa]	チ [tʃi]	チュ [tʃu]		チョ [tʃo]				
n		ナ [na]	ニ [ɲi]	ヌ [nu]	ネ [ne]	ノ [no]	ニャ [ɲa]	ニュ [ɲu]	ニョ [ɲo]	ヌァ [nwa]
h		ハ [ha]			ヘ [he]	ホ [ho]				
ç		ヒャ [ça]	ヒ [çi]	ヒュ [çu]		ヒョ [ço]				
ɸ		ファ [ɸa]		フ [ɸu]						
ˀp		ˀパ^{ツ}パ [ˀpa]	ˀピ^{ツ}ピ [ˀpi]	ˀプ^{ツ}プ [ˀpu]	ˀペ^{ツ}ペ [ˀpe]	ˀポ^{ツ}ポ [ˀpo]	ˀピャ^{ツ}ピャ [ˀpja]	ˀピュ^{ツ}ピュ [ˀpju]	ˀピョ^{ツ}ピョ [ˀpjo]	ˀプァ^{ツ}プァ [ˀpwa]
b		バ [ba]	ビ [bi]	ブ [bu]	ベ [be]	ボ [bo]	ビャ [bja]	ビュ [bju]	ビョ [bjo]	ブァ [bwa]
m		マ [ma]	ミ [mi]	ム [mu]	メ [me]	モ [mo]	ミャ [mja]	ミュ [mju]	ミョ [mjo]	ムァ [mwa]
j		ヤ [ja]		ユ [ju]		ヨ [jo]				
ɾ		ラ [ɾa]	リ [ɾi]	ル [ɾu]	レ [ɾe]	ロ [ɾo]	リャ [ɾja]	リュ [ɾju]	リョ [ɾjo]	ルァ [ɾwa]
w		ワ [wa]								

Chōon (long vowel)	ー
Sokuon (geminated consonant)	ッ
Hatsuon (moraic nasal)	ン [m, n, ɲ, ŋ, ɴ]

=== Reference Table 1 ===
The Reference Table 1 (参考第1表, Sankō Dai-Ippyō) provides a unified orthography that allows for the simultaneous distinction of all phonemes across the five languages (including their dialects).

		a	i	u	e	o	ɿ		ɛ	ja	ju	jo	wa	wi	we
		a	i	u	e	o	(Y) (Note: Yaeyama phoneme)	(M) (Note: Miyako phoneme)	ɛ	ja	ju	jo	wa	wi	we
ˀ∅		ア	イ	ウ	エ	オ	イ゚		エ゚						
ˀ∅	Initial	[ˀa]	[ˀi]	[ˀu]	[ˀe]	[ˀo]	[z][^{z}ï][ɿ][ɨ][ï]		[ɛ] [ë]						
ˀ∅	Else	[a]	[i]	[u]	[e]	[o]	[z][^{z}ï][ɿ][ɨ][ï]		[ɛ] [ë]						
∅		ʼア^{ア}ア	ʼイ^{イ}イ	ʼウ^{ウ}ウ	ʼエ^{エ}エ	ʼオ^{オ}オ									
∅	Initial	ʼa [a]	ʼi [i][ji]	ʼu [u][wu]	ʼe [e]	ʼo [o]									
∅	Else	Not used													
k		カ [ka]	キ [ki]	ク [ku][kɷ]	ケ [ke]	コ [ko]	キィ [kɿ] [kï][kɨ]	クㇲ [ks][k^{s}ï][kɿ][kɨ]	ケェ [kɛ][kë]	キャ [kja]	キュ [kju]	キョ [kjo]	クヮ [kwa]	クィ [kwi]	クェ [kwe]
ˀk		ˀカ^{ツ}カ [ˀka]	ˀキ^{ツ}キ [ˀki]	ˀク^{ツ}ク [ˀku]	ˀケ^{ツ}ケ [ˀke]	ˀコ^{ツ}コ [ˀko]				ˀキャ^{ツ}キャ [ˀkja]	ˀキュ^{ツ}キュ [ˀkju]	ˀキョ^{ツ}キョ [ˀkjo]	ˀクヮ^{ツ}クヮ [ˀkwa]	ˀクィ^{ツ}クィ [ˀkwi]	ˀクェ^{ツ}クェ [ˀkwe]
ɡ		ガ [ɡa]	ギ [ɡi]	グ [ɡu][ɡɷ]	ゲ [ɡe]	ゴ [ɡo]	ギィ [ɡɿ] [ɡï][ɡɨ]	グㇲ゙ [ɡz][ɡ^{z}ï][ɡɨ]	ゲェ [ɡɛ][ɡë]	ギャ [ɡja]	ギュ [ɡju]	ギョ [ɡjo]	グヮ [ɡwa]	グィ [ɡwi]	グェ [ɡwe]
ŋ		カ゚ [ŋa]	キ゚ [ŋi]	ク゚ [ŋu]	ケ゚ [ŋe]	コ゚ [ŋo]				キ゚ャ [ŋja]	キ゚ュ [ŋju]	キ゚ョ [ŋjo]	ク゚ヮ [ŋwa]		
s		サ [sa]	スィ [si]	ス [su]	セ [se]	ソ [so]	シィ [sɿ] [sï][sɨ]	ㇲ [s][sɿ][sï][sɨ]	スェ゚ [sɛ] [së]				スァ [swa]		
ʃ		シャ [ʃa]	シ [ʃi]	シュ [ʃu]	シェ [ʃe]	ショ [ʃo]							シュァ [ʃwa]		
dz		ザ [dza]	ズィ [dzi]	ズ [dzu]	ゼ [dze]	ゾ [dzo]	ジィ [dzɿ][dzï][dzɨ]	ㇲ゙ [dz][dzɿ][dzï][dzɨ]	ズェ゚ [dzɛ][dzë]				ズァ [dzwa]		
dʒ		ジャ [dʒa]	ジ [dʒi]	ジュ [dʒu]	ジェ [dʒe]	ジョ [dʒo]							ジュァ [dʒwa]		
z		サ゚ [za]		ス゚ [zu]	セ゚ [ze]	ソ゚ [zo]		ㇲ゚ [z][zɿ][zï][zɨ]							
ʒ		シ゚ャ [ʒa]	シ゚ [ʒi]	シ゚ュ [ʒu]		シ゚ョ [ʒo]									
t		タ [ta]	ティ [ti]	トゥ [tu]	テ [te]	ト [to]				テャ [tja]	テュ [tju]	テョ [tjo]	トァ [twa]		
ˀt		ˀタ^{ツ}タ [ˀta]	ˀティ^{ツ}ティ [ˀti]	ˀトゥ^{ツ}トゥ [ˀtu]	ˀテ^{ツ}テ [ˀte]	ˀト^{ツ}ト [ˀto]				ˀテャ^{ツ}テャ [ˀtja]	ˀテュ^{ツ}テュ [ˀtju]	ˀテョ^{ツ}テョ [ˀtjo]	ˀトァ^{ツ}トァ [ˀtwa]		
d		ダ [da]	ディ [di]	ドゥ [du]	デ [de]	ド [do]				デャ [dja]	デュ [dju]	デョ [djo]	ドァ [dwa]		
ts		ツァ [tsa]	ツィ [tsi]	ツ [tsu]	ツェ [tse]	ツォ [tso]	チィ [tsɿ][tsï][tsɨ]	ッ (Note: In the Reference Table 1 system, a small ッ will represent both Sokuon (geminated consonant) and Miyako [tsɿ].) [ts][tsɿ][tsï][tsɨ]	ツェ゚ [tsɛ][tsë]				ツヮ [tswa]		
ˀts		ˀツァ^{ツ}ツァ [ˀtsa]	ˀツィ^{ツ}ツィ [ˀtsi]	ˀツ^{ツ}ツ [ˀtsu]	ˀツェ^{ツ}ツェ [ˀtse]	ˀツォ^{ツ}ツォ [ˀtso]									
tʃ		チャ [tʃa]	チ [tʃi]	チュ [tʃu]	チェ [tʃe]	チョ [tʃo]									
ˀtʃ		ˀチャ^{ツ}チャ [ˀtʃa]	ˀチ^{ツ}チ [ˀtʃi]	ˀチュ^{ツ}チュ [ˀtʃu]	ˀチェ^{ツ}チェ [ˀtʃe]	ˀチョ^{ツ}チョ [ˀtʃo]									
n		ナ [na]		ヌ [nu]	ネ [ne]	ノ [no]	ニィ [nɿ][nɨ][nï]		ネェ [nɛ][në]				ヌァ [nwa]		
ɲ		ニャ [ɲa]	ニ [ɲi]	ニュ [ɲu]	ニェ [ɲe]	ニョ [ɲo]									
ˀn		ˀナ^{ツ}ナ [ˀna]		ˀヌ^{ツ}ヌ [ˀnu]	ˀネ^{ツ}ネ [ˀne]	ˀノ^{ツ}ノ [ˀno]									
ˀɲ		ˀニャ^{ツ}ニャ [ˀɲa]	ˀニ^{ツ}ニ [ˀɲi]	ˀニュ^{ツ}ニュ [ˀɲu]		ˀニョ^{ツ}ニョ [ˀɲo]									
h		ハ [ha]		フゥ [hu]	ヘ [he]	ホ [ho]									
ç		ヒャ [ça]	ヒ [çi][hi]	ヒュ [çu]		ヒョ [ço]									
ɸ		ファ [ɸa]	フィ [ɸi]	フ [ɸu]	フェ [ɸe]	フォ [ɸo]									
f		^{フ}ア [fa]	^{フ}イ [fi]	^{フ}ウ [fu]	^{フ}エ [fe]	^{フ}オ [fo]				^{フ}ヤ [fja]	^{フ}ユ [fju]	^{フ}ヨ [fjo]			
p		パ [pa]	ピ [pi]	プ [pu]	ペ [pe]	ポ [po]	ピィ [pɿ][pï][pɨ]	プㇲ [ps][p^{s}ï][pɿ][pɨ]	ペェ [pɛ][pë]	ピャ [pja]	ピュ [pju]	ピョ [pjo]	プァ [pwa]		
ˀp		ˀパ^{ツ}パ [ˀpa]	ˀピ^{ツ}ピ [ˀpi]	ˀプ^{ツ}プ [ˀpu]	ˀペ^{ツ}ペ [ˀpe]	ˀポ^{ツ}ポ [ˀpo]				ˀピャ^{ツ}ピャ [ˀpja]	ˀピュ^{ツ}ピュ [ˀpju]	ˀピョ^{ツ}ピョ [ˀpjo]	ˀプァ^{ツ}プァ [ˀpwa]		
b		バ [ba]	ビ [bi]	ブ [bu]	ベ [be]	ボ [bo]	ビィ [bɿ][bï][bɨ]	ブㇲ゙ [bz][b^{z}ї][bɿ] [bɨ]	ベェ [bɛ][bë]	ビャ [bja]	ビュ [bju]	ビョ [bjo]	ブァ [bwa]		
v		ヴァ [va]	ヴィ [vi]	ヴ [vu]	ヴェ [ve]	ヴォ [vo]				ヴャ [vja]	ヴュ [vju]	ヴョ [vjo]			
m		マ [ma]	ミ [mi]	ム [mu]	メ [me]	モ [mo]	ミィ [mɿ][mï][mɨ]	ムㇲ゙ [mz][m^{z}ї][mɿ][mɨ]	メェ [mɛ][më]	ミャ [mja]	ミュ [mju]	ミョ [mjo]	ムァ [mwa]		
ˀm		ˀマ^{ツ}マ [ˀma]	ˀミ^{ツ}ミ [ˀmi]	ˀム^{ツ}ム [ˀmu]	ˀメ^{ツ}メ [ˀme]	ˀモ^{ツ}モ [ˀmo]				ˀミャ^{ツ}ミャ [ˀmja]	ˀミュ^{ツ}ミュ [ˀmju]	ˀミョ^{ツ}ミョ [ˀmjo]			
j		ヤ [ja]		ユ [ju]	イェ [je]	ヨ [jo]									
ˀj		ˀヤ^{ツ}ヤ [ˀja]		ˀユ^{ツ}ユ [ˀju]	ˀイェ^{ツ}イェ [ˀje]	ˀヨ^{ツ}ヨ [ˀjo]									
ɾ		ラ [ɾa]	リ [ɾi]	ル [ɾu]	レ [ɾe]	ロ [ɾo]	リィ [ɾɿ][ɾï][ɾɨ]		レェ [ɾɛ][ɾë]	リャ [ɾja]	リュ [ɾju]	リョ [ɾjo]	ルァ [ɾwa]		
θ		ラ゚ [θa]	リ゚ [θi]	ル゚ [θu]	レ゚ [θe]	ロ゚ [θo]									
ˀɾ		ˀラ^{ツ}ラ [ˀɾa]	ˀリ^{ツ}リ [ˀɾi]												
w		ワ [wa][ʋa]	ウィ [wi]		ウェ [we]	ウォ [wo]									
ˀw		ˀワ^{ツ}ワ [ˀwa]	ˀウィ^{ツ}ウィ [ˀwi]		ˀウェ^{ツ}ウェ [ˀwe]										

Chōon (long vowel)		ー
Sokuon (geminated consonant)		ッ
Hatsuon (moraic nasal)	Initial	ʼン, ^{ン}ン ʼn, ʼm, ʼɲ, ʼŋ, ʼɴ [n-, m-, ɲ-, ŋ-, ɴ]
Hatsuon (moraic nasal)	Initial	ˀン，^{ツ}ン [ˀn, ˀm, ˀɲ, ˀŋ, ˀɴ]
Hatsuon (moraic nasal)	Else	ン [-n, -m, -ɲ, -ŋ, -ɴ]
Syllabic consonant (Ōgami Is., Irabu Is.)		クㇷ [kf], ムㇽ [ml], プㇽ [pl], ブㇽ [bl]
Isolated consonant		ム゚ [m], ㇷ [f], ゥ゙ [v], ㇼ [l], ㇽ [r]

==== Auxiliary symbols ====
Vowel reduction	(Hateruma Is., Shiraho in Ishigaki Is.)	カ̥ [ka˳] , キ̥ [ki˳], ク̥ [ku˳], キィ̥ [kɿ˳][kɨ˳], サ̥ [sa˳], シ̥ [ʃi˳], ス̥ [su˳], タ̥ [ta˳], ティ̥ [ti˳], トゥ̥ [tu˳], チ̥ [tʃi˳], ツ̥ [tsu˳], チィ̥ [tsɿ˳][tsɨ˳], ナ̥ [na˳], ニ̥ [ni˳], ニィ̥ [nɿ˳][nɨ˳], パ̥ [pa˳], ピ̥ [pi˳], ピィ̥ [pɿ˳][pɨ˳], マ̥ [ma˳], ミ̥ [mi˳], ミィ̥ [mɿ˳][mɨ˳], ラ̥ [ɾa ˳], リ̥ [ɾi ˳], リィ̥ [ɾɿ ˳][ɾɨ˳], ン̥ [n˳][m˳]
Vowel reduction	(Taketomi Is.)	ヒ̥ [çi˳], フ̥ [ɸu˳]
Nasal vowel		ア̃ [ã], イ̃ [ĩ], ウ̃ [ũ], エ̃ [ẽ], オ̃ [õ]
Nasalization		ヒ̃ [hĩ], ン̃ [ñ][ɿ̃]
Open vowel (Taketomi Is.)		アァ [a]

== See also ==
- Ryukyuan languages
- Okinawan scripts
