= Okinawan scripts =

Orthography of the Okinawan language

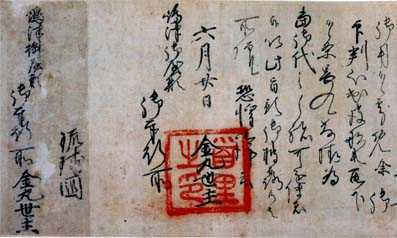
An example of traditional Okinawan writing circa 1471 written in Japanese Epistolary style (候文)

Okinawan is a Japonic language spoken on Okinawa Island. Okinawan-language documents of the Ryukyu Kingdom were written in kanji and hiragana, derived from Japan.

Although generally agreed among linguists to be a distinct language, most Japanese, as well as some Okinawans, tend to think of Okinawan as merely a regional dialect of Japanese, even though it is not mutually intelligible to monolingual Japanese speakers. Modern Okinawan is not written frequently.

== Systems ==
=== Traditional usage ===
Traditional scripts in Okinawa is called 古文書. Before the Satsuma invasion in 1609, Man'yōgana (万葉仮名) was used in Japanese Epistolary style (候文). Unlike modern writing system あ could be written in 安・阿・愛・亜・悪 with Cursive script (崩し字).

Tana family documents (田名家文書), which are letters of rank appointment issued by the Shuri Royal Government, are written in Japanese Epistolary style (候文) with Hentaigana. However, after the Satsuma invasion, Japanese culture was banned as part of the policy of exoticizing Ryukyu, and under the policy of Haneji Ōji Chōshū, documents within Ryukyu also began to be written in classical Chinese.

Comparison of official documents of Tana family documents.

Tana family documents in 1523	Tana family documents in 1647

Chinese translation of Okinawan Script in 1721 tells that Okinawan scripts were written in the same phonetic system as in mainland Japan. The system is called iroha order.

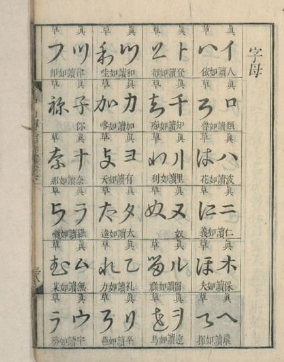
Chinese translation of Okinawan Script in 1721 (Hiragana and Katakana)

=== Conventional usages ===
The modern conventional ad hoc spellings found in Okinawa.

=== Council system ===
The system was devised by the Council for the Dissemination of Okinawan Dialect.

=== University of the Ryukyus system ===
This system was devised by Okinawa Center of Language Study, a section of University of the Ryukyus. Unlike others, this method is intended purely as a phonetic guidance, and basically only uses katakana. For the sake of an easier comparison, corresponding hiragana are used in this article.

=== New Okinawan letters ===
新沖縄文字 (Shin Okinawa-moji), devised by Yoshiaki Funazu (船津好明, Funazu Yoshiaki), in his textbook Utsukushii Okinawa no Hōgen (美しい沖縄の方言; "The beautiful Okinawan Dialect"; ISBN 4-905784-19-0). The rule applies to hiragana only. Katakana is used as in Japanese; just like in the conventional usage of Okinawan. A TrueType font incorporating the New Okinawan letters into the IPA Font has been released by Hitoshi Kobayashi (Institute of Cultural Informatics, Surugadai University).

=== Unified Orthography for the Ryukyuan Languages ===
The Unified Orthography for the Ryukyuan Languages (琉球諸語統一的表記法, Ryūkyū Shogo Tōitsu-teki Hyōkihō) is an orthographic system created with the assistance of about 20 linguists for the general public who wish to write in or express themselves through the various Ryukyuan languages, and published in 2015 in Ryūkyū no Kotoba no Kakikata: Ryūkyū Shogo Tōitsu-teki Hyōkihō (琉球のことばの書き方 琉球諸語統一的表記法; "How to Write the Ryukyuan Languages: A Unified Orthography for the Ryukyuan Languages") (ISBN 9784874246757), edited by Shinji Ogawa (小川晋史, Ogawa Shinji). Sounds found in languages ranging from Amami to Yaeyama are represented within a unified writing system. Part I proposes general principles of orthography, while Part II presents specific examples of writing from eight dialects selected to represent the Ryukyuan archipelago. This article discusses the orthography of the Shuri dialect, authored by Nana Tōyama (當山奈那, Tōyama Nana), as described in Chapter 4 of Part II.

=== Shimakutuba Orthography ===
The Shimakutuba Orthography (しまくとぅば正書法, Shimakutuba Seishohō) is a system established by Okinawa Prefecture in 2022. Since it was officially enacted by the prefecture, this system can be regarded as the closest to an official orthography of the Okinawan language. However, at present it has not yet become widely adopted among the general public.

Because this orthography was created as a standard writing system for representing the Ryukyuan languages spoken in various regions of Okinawa Prefecture, it provides rules not only for Okinawan, but also for Kunigami, Miyako, Yaeyama, and Yonaguni. Please see its article for other languages' systems.

Like the University of the Ryukyus system, Shimakutuba Orthography only uses katakana. For the sake of an easier comparison, corresponding hiragana are used in this article.

== Basic syllables and kai-yōon (palatalized syllables) ==
		i	u	e	o	ya	yu	ye	yo
(Initial) ^{1}		[i] [ji]	[u] [wu]	[e] [je]	[o] [wo]	[ja]	[ju]	[je]	[jo]
(Elsewhere)		(Not used) ^{2}				[ja]	[ju]	[je]	[jo]
Conventional		い	う をぅ	え いぇ	お を うぉ	や	ゆ		よ
Council		ゆぃ	をぅ	ゆぇ	を	や	ゆ		よ
Ryukyu Univ.		ゐ	をぅ	え	を	や	ゆ		よ
New Okinawan		い゙		え゙	を	や	ゆ		よ
Unified		い	う	え	お	や	ゆ		よ
Shimakutuba ^{3}		’い^{い}い	’う^{う}う	’え^{え}え	’お^{お}お	や	ゆ	いぇ	よ
'	'a a	'i i	'u u	'e e	'o o	'ya	'yu	'ye	'yo
(Initial) ^{1}	[ʔa]	[ʔi]	[ʔu]	[ʔe]	[ʔo]	[ʔja]	[ʔju]	[ʔje]	[ʔjo]
(Elsewhere)	[a]	[i] [ji]	[u] [wu]	[e] [je]	[o] [wo]	[ʔja]	[ʔju]	[ʔje]	[ʔjo]
Conventional	あ	い	う	え いぇ	お うぉ	や	ゆ		よ
Council	あ	い	う	え	お	っや	っゆ		っよ
Ryukyu Univ.	あ	い	う	いぇ	お	いゃ	いゅ		いょ
New Okinawan	あ	い	う	え	お				
Unified	'あ	'い	'う	'え	'お	'や	'ゆ		'よ
Shimakutuba ^{3}	あ	い	う	え	お	^{ʔ}や^{つ}や	^{ʔ}ゆ^{つ}ゆ	^{ʔ}いぇ^{つ}いぇ	^{ʔ}よ^{つ}よ
k	ka	ki	ku	ke	ko	kya	kyu		kyo
	[ka]	[ki]	[ku]	[ke]	[ko]	[kja]	[kju]		[kjo]
Others	か	き	く	け	こ	きゃ			
Shimakutuba	か	き	く	け	こ	きゃ	きゅ		きょ
g	ga	gi	gu	ge	go	gya	gyu		gyo
	[ɡa]	[ɡi]	[ɡu]	[ɡe]	[ɡo]	[ɡja]	[ɡju]		[ɡjo]
Others	が	ぎ	ぐ	げ	ご	ぎゃ			
Shimakutuba	が	ぎ	ぐ	げ	ご	ぎゃ	ぎゅ		ぎょ
s	sa	si	su	se	so				
	[sa]	[si]	[su]	[se]	[so]				
Others	さ		す		そ				
Ryukyu Univ.	さ	すぃ	す	せ	そ				
Unified	さ	すぃ	す	せ	そ				
Shimakutuba	さ	すぃ	す	せ	そ				
sh sy	sha sya	shi	shu syu	she sye	sho syo				
	[ʃa]	[ʃi]	[ʃu]	[ʃe]	[ʃo]				
Others	しゃ	し	しゅ	しぇ					
Unified	しゃ	し	しゅ	しぇ	しょ				
Shimakutuba	しゃ	し	しゅ	しぇ	しょ				
z	za	zi	zu	ze	zo				
(Initial) ^{1}	[dza]	[dzi] [dʐi]	[dzu]	[dze]	[dzo]				
(Elsewhere)	[za]	[zi]	[zu]	[ze]	[zo]				
Others	ざ	じ	ず	ぜ	ぞ				
Ryukyu Univ.	ざ	づぃ	ず づ	ぜ	ぞ				
Unified	ざ	づぃ ずぃ	ず	ぜ	ぞ				
Shimakutuba	ざ	ずぃ	ず	ぜ	ぞ				
j	ja	ji	ju	je	jo				
	[dʒa]	[dʒi]	[dʒu]	[dʒe]	[dʒo]				
Others	じゃ	じ	じゅ	じぇ	じょ				
Ryukyu Univ.	じゃ ぢゃ	じ ぢ	じゅ ぢゅ	じぇ ぢぇ	じょ ぢょ				
t	ta	ti	tu	te	to				
	[ta]	[ti]	[tu]	[te]	[to]				
Others	た	てぃ	とぅ	て	と				
New Okinawan	た			て	と				
d	da	di	du	de	do				
	[da]	[di]	[du]	[de]	[do]				
Others	だ	でぃ	どぅ	で	ど				
New Okinawan	だ			で	ど				
ch c	cha ca	chi ci	chu cu	che ce	cho co				
	[tʃa]	[tʃi]	[tʃu]	[tʃe]	[tʃo]				
	ちゃ	ち	ちゅ	ちぇ	ちょ				
ts	tsa	tsi	tsu	tse	tso				
	[tsa]	[tsi] [tʂi]	[tsu]	[tse]	[tso]				
Ryukyu Univ.		つぃ	つ						
Shimakutuba	つぁ	つぃ	つ	つぇ	つぉ				
n	na	ni	nu	ne	no	nya	nyu		
	[na]	[ɲi]	[nu]	[ne]	[no]	[ɲa]	[ɲu]		
	な	に	ぬ	ね	の	にゃ	にゅ		
h	ha	hi	fu hu	he	ho	hya	hyu		hyo
	[ha]	[çi]	[ɸu]	[çe]	[ho]	[ça]	[çu]		[ço]
	は	ひ	ふ	へ	ほ	ひゃ	ひゅ		ひょ
b	ba	bi	bu	be	bo	bya	byu		byo
	[ba]	[bi]	[bu]	[be]	[bo]	[bja]	[bju]		[bjo]
	ば	び	ぶ	べ	ぼ	びゃ	びゅ		びょ
p	pa	pi	pu	pe	po	pya	pyu		
	[pa]	[pi]	[pu]	[pe]	[po]	[pja]	[pju]		
	ぱ	ぴ	ぷ	ぺ	ぽ	ぴゃ	ぴゅ		
m	ma	mi	mu	me	mo	mya	myu		myo
	[ma]	[mi]	[mu]	[me]	[mo]	[mja]	[mju]		[mjo]
	ま	み	む	め	も	みゃ	みゅ		みょ
r	ra	ri	ru	re	ro				
	[ɾa]	[ɾi]	[ɾu]	[ɾe]	[ɾo]				
	ら	り	る	れ	ろ				

^{1}: At the beginning of a word.
^{2}: University of the Ryukyus system always use ゐ, をぅ, え, を (ヰ, ヲゥ, エ, ヲ) for [i], [u], [e], [o], and い, う, いぇ, お (イ, ウ, イェ, オ) for [ʔi], [ʔu], [ʔe], [ʔo], respectively. Likewise, Unified Orthography for the Ryukyuan Languages always use い, う, え, お for [i], [u], [e], [o], and 'い, 'う, 'え, 'お for [ʔi], [ʔu], [ʔe], [ʔo], respectively.
^{3}: In Shimakutuba Orthography, two types of notation are presented for word-initial vowels without glottal stop, as well as some consonants preceded by glottal stop ([ʔj], [ʔɰ], [ʔn]): one employs diacritical marks (an apostrophe or a superscript glottal stop symbol), while the other uses a superscript kana.

== Gō-yōon (labialised syllables) ==
	wa	wi	we	wo
	[ɰa]	[ɰi]	[ɰe]	[ɰo]
Conventional	わ	うぃ	うぇ	
Council	わ	うぃ	うぇ	
Ryukyu Univ.	わ	ゑぃ	ゑ	
New Okinawan	わ	ゐ	ゑ	
Unified	わ	うぃ	うぇ	
Shimakutuba	わ	うぃ	うぇ	うぉ
'	'wa	'wi	'we	
	[ʔɰa]	[ʔɰi]	[ʔɰe]	
Conventional	わ	うぃ	うぇ	
Council	っわ	っうぃ	っうぇ	
Ryukyu Univ.	うゎ	うゐ	うぇ	
New Okinawan				
Unified	'わ	'うぃ	'うぇ	
Shimakutuba ^{3}	^{ʔ}わ^{つ}わ	^{ʔ}うぃ^{つ}うぃ	^{ʔ}うぇ^{つ}うぇ	
k	kwa	kwi	kwe	
	[kʷa]	[kʷi]	[kʷe]	
Conventional	くぁ くゎ	くぃ	くぇ	
Council	くゎ	くぃ	くぇ	
Ryukyu Univ.	くゎ	くゐ	くぇ	
New Okinawan				
Unified	くゎ	くぃ	くぇ	
Shimakutuba	くゎ	くぃ	くぇ	
g	gwa	gwi	gwe	
	[ɡʷa]	[ɡʷi]	[ɡʷe]	
Conventional	ぐぁ ぐゎ	ぐぃ	ぐぇ	
Council	ぐゎ	ぐぃ	ぐぇ	
Ryukyu Univ.	ぐゎ	ぐゐ	ぐぇ	
New Okinawan				
Unified	ぐゎ	ぐぃ	ぐぇ	
Shimakutuba	ぐゎ	ぐぃ	ぐぇ	
h	fa hwa	fi hwi	fe hwe	fo hwo
	[ɸa]	[ɸi]	[ɸe]	
Conventional	ふぁ	ふぃ	ふぇ	
Council	ふぁ	ふぃ	ふぇ	
Ryukyu Univ.	ふゎ	ふぃ	ふぇ	
New Okinawan				
Unified	ふぁ	ふぃ	ふぇ	
Shimakutuba	ふぁ	ふぃ	ふぇ	ふぉ

== Others ==
	n ^{4}	^{5}	^{6}
Others	ん	っ	ー
Shimakutuba ^{3}	’ん^{ん}ん ん	っ	ー
'	'n		
Conventional	ん		
Council	っん		
Ryukyu Univ.	っん		
New Okinawan			
Unified	'ん		
Shimakutuba ^{3} ^{7}	^{ʔ}ん^{つ}ん		

^{4}: Hatsuon (moraic n)
^{5}: Sokuon (geminated consonants)
^{6}: Chōon (longer vowels): In conventional usages, longer vowels are sometimes spelled like in mainland Japanese as well; "ou" (おう) for ō, doubled kana for others. (e.g. うう for ū.)
^{7}: In Shimakutuba Orthography, moraic n in word initial is spelt as ’ん or ^{ん}ん if without glottal stop, while 'n with glottal stop is spelt as ^{ʔ}ん or ^{つ}ん. Both are spelt simply as ん elsewhere.
