= Yonaha Maehama =

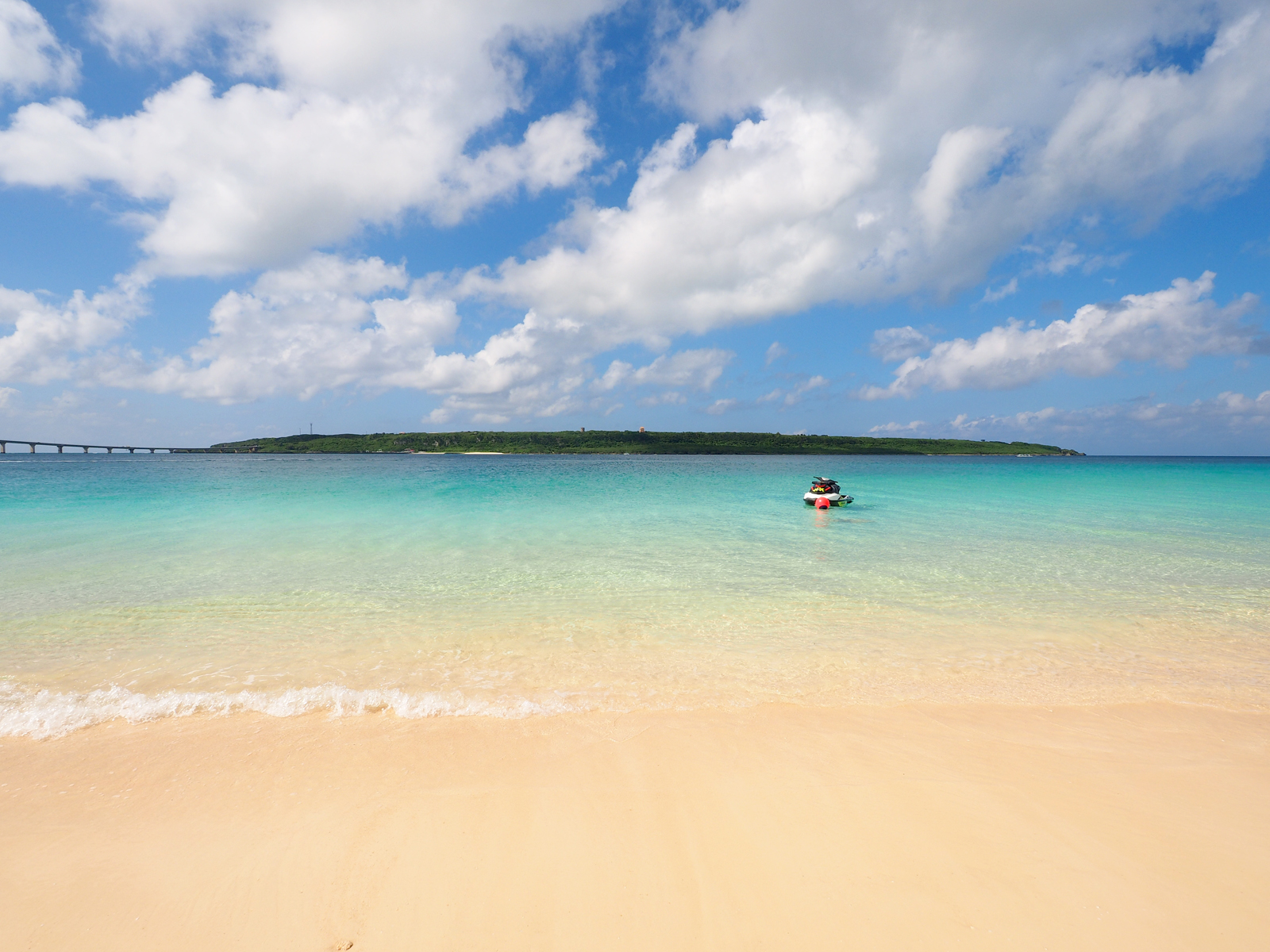
- Interactive map of Yonaha Maehama
- Coordinates: 24°44′05″N 125°15′46″E
- Country: Japan
- Prefecture: Okinawa Prefecture
- Time zone: Japan Standard Time

Yonaha Maehama (与那覇前浜ビーチ, Miyakoan:Maipama) is a popular bathing beach on Miyakojima Island in Miyakojima City, Okinawa Prefecture in Japan. This seven kilometer white sandy beach is at the southwestern tip of Miyako Island. Locals refer to it simply as "Maehama" (Maipama, Maibama), but in recent years it is often called Maehama Beach, with the English loan word added. In Miyako, "mai" means not only "front" but also "south", so the named Maehama may have been chosen because it is located in front and south of the island's Yonaha district. Kurima Island is located opposite this beach, and the Kurima Ohashi Bridge connects the southeastern end of the beach to Kurima Island. On the slightly northwestern side of that bridge is Maehama Port, where boats used to arrive and depart from before the bridge was built.

In recent years, erosion of this beach has been progressing, and there are concerns about its impact on tourism. In particular, some typhoons in 2018 caused extensive erosion and a series of cliffs.

== Facilities ==
The beach offers a free parking lot, changing rooms, showers, and restrooms, as well as a store and cafeteria. During the tourist season, jellyfish prevention nets are set up and monitors are stationed. In summer, vendors also operate recreational equipment rentals.

== Ratings ==
This beach was ranked No. 1 in the "Top 10 Best Beaches in Japan" by TripAdvisor in 2019. It was also ranked highly various times between 2010 and 2016. Okinawa Prefecture conducts pre-season and in-season water quality surveys at beaches receiving more than 10,000 visitors annually, and Maehama Beach received a "Water Quality A" (suitable for swimming) rating in the 2019 in-season survey

== Events ==
The bathing season at this beach is from late March to the end of October, and at other times of the year the beach is relatively quiet. This sandy beach is the starting point for the All Japan Triathlon Miyakojima, which is held each April.
