= Tarama language =

Japonic language

Tarama
- Native to: Japan
- Region: Tarama, Okinawa
- Native speakers: (undated figure of mostly over age 60?)
- Language family: Japonic: Ryukyuan; Southern Ryukyuan; Miyakoan; Tarama
- Writing system: Japanese

Language codes
- ISO 639-3: None (mis)
- Glottolog: tara1319

The Tarama language is a Japonic language spoken on the islands of Tarama and nearly depopulated Minna, two of the Miyako Islands of Japan. It is closely related to Miyakoan, but intelligibility is low. Currently, it is only spoken natively by elderly people.

== Phonology ==
=== Vowels ===
Tarama has four main vowels, and three marginal vowels /e, ə, o/ found in a restricted set of words.

Tarama vowels
| | Front | Central | Back |
|---|---|---|---|
| Close | i | ɨ | u |
| Mid | (e) | (ə) | (o) |
| Open | | a | |

/ɨ/ is [s̩] between voiceless consonants, otherwise [ˢɨ] after plosives, and [ɨ] elsewhere:

[ps̩tu] 'person', [kˢɨːlu] 'yellow', [mɨːɡɨ] 'right'

See also Miyakoan language#Vowels, for information on the close central vowel.

The sequences /*tɨ/, /*dɨ/, /*nɨ/, /*lɨ/ do not occur. They have changed to /tsɨ/, /zɨ/, /n̩/ and /l/ ([ɭ̆]).

=== Consonants ===
Tarama does have voiced stops:

Tarama consonants
| | | Labial | Coronal | Dorsal |
|---|---|---|---|---|
| Nasal | | m | n | |
| Plosive | voiceless | p | t | k |
| Plosive | voiced | b | d | g |
| Affricate | | | ts | |
| Fricative | voiceless | f | s | |
| Fricative | voiced | v | z | |
| Approximant | | w~ʋ | 𝼈 ⟨l⟩ | j |

The 'l' is a retroflex lateral flap, also found in the Irabu language (Jarosz p. 43). /m n f v s z l/ occur as syllable codas, as in pail 'to grow' (Japanese haeru), psks 'to pull' (Japanese hiku).

The two nasals may be syllabic, as in mm 'potato' and nna 'rope'. 'Onsets' include geminate consonants, as in ssam 'loose' and ffa 'child'. Otherwise, the only consonant clusters are /Cj/, as in kjuu 'today', sjata 'sugar'. Sonorants can end syllables and words, as in kan 'crab', mim 'ear', and tul 'bird'. Vowel sequences include long vowels Vː and the 'diphthongs' Vi, and Vɨ. This structure has been analyzed as a syllable, but initial geminate consonants, long vowels and diphthongs are all bimoraic, and codas are moraic as well, so that e.g. ssam is three moras ([s̩sam̩]. A phonological word must be at least two moras long.

== Orthography ==
Tarama Orthography
| | /a/ | /i/ | /ɿ/ | /u/ | /e/ | /o/ | /ə/ | /ja/ | /ju/ | /jo/ |
|---|---|---|---|---|---|---|---|---|---|---|
| /Ø/ | あ /a/ [a] | い /i/ [i] | イ゚ /ɿ/ [^{z}ɨ] | う /u/ [u] | え /e/ [e] | お /o/ [o] | エ /ə/ [ə] | や /ya/ [ja] | ゆ /yu/ [ju] | よ /yo/ [jo] |
| /k/ | か /ka/ [ka] | き /ki/ [ki] | キ゚ /kɿ/ [k^{s}ɨ] | く /ku/ [ku] | け /ke/ [ke] | こ /ko/ [ko] | キ゚ェ /kə/ [kə] | きゃ /kya/ [kja] | きゅ /kyu/ [kju] | きょ /kyo/ [kjo] |
| /g/ | が /ga/ [ga] | ぎ /gi/ [gi] | ギ /gɿ/ [g^{z}ɨ] | ぐ /gu/ [gu] | げ /ge/ [ge] | ご /go/ [go] | ギェ /gə/ [gə] | ぎゃ /gya/ [gja] | ぎゅ /gyu/ [gju] | ぎょ /gyo/ [gjo] |
| /s/ | さ /sa/ [sa] | すぃ /si/ [si] | す /sɿ/ [sɨ] | すぅ /su/ [su] | せ /se/ [se] | そ /so/ [so] | すェ /sə/ [sə] | | | |
| /dz/ | ざ /dza/ [dza] | | ず /dzɿ/ [dzɨ] | ずぅ /dzu/ [dzu] | ぜ /dze/ [dze] | ぞ /dzo/ [dzo] | ずェ /dzə/ [dzə] | | | |
| /sh/ | しゃ /sha/ [ɕa] | し /shi/ [ɕi] | | しゅ /shu/ [ɕu] | しぇ /she/ [ɕe] | しょ /sho/ [ɕo] | | | | |
| /j/ | じゃ /ja/ [dʑa] | じ /ji/ [dʑi] | | じゅ /ju/ [dʑu] | じぇ /je/ [dʑe] | じょ /jo/ [dʑo] | | | | |
| /z/ | ズぁ /za/ [za] | ズぃ /zi/ [zi] | | ズぅ /ju/ [zu] | ズぇ /ze/ [ze] | ズぉ /zo/ [zo] | | | | |
| /t/ | た /ta/ [ta] | てぃ /ti/ [ti] | | とぅ /tu/ [tu] | て /te/ [te] | と /to/ [to] | | | | |
| /d/ | だ /da/ [da] | でぃ /di/ [di] | | どぅ /du/ [du] | で /de/ [de] | ど /do/ [do] | | | | |
| /ch/ | ちゃ /cha/ [tɕa] | ち /chi/ [tɕi] | つ /chɿ/ [tɕɨ] | ちゅ /chu/ [tɕu] | ちぇ /che/ [tɕe] | ちょ /cho/ [tɕo] | つェ /chə/ [tsə] | | | |
| /n/ | な /na/ [na] | に /ni/ [ni] | | ぬ /nu/ [nu] | ね /ne/ [ne] | の /no/ [no] | | にゃ /nya/ [nja] | にゅ /nyu/ [nju] | にょ /nyo/ [njo] |
| /h/ | は /ha/ [ha] | ひ /hi/ [hi] | | ほぅ /hu/ [hu] | へ /he/ [he] | ほ /ho/ [ho] | | ひゃ /hya/ [hja] | ひゅ /hyu/ [hju] | ひょ /hyo/ [hjo] |
| /p/ | ぱ /pa/ [pa] | ぴ /pi/ [pi] | ピ /pɿ/ [p^{s}ɨ] | ぷ /pu/ [pu] | ぺ /pe/ [pe] | ぽ /po/ [po] | ピェ /pə/ [pə] | ぴゃ /pya/ [pja] | ぴゅ /pyu/ [pju] | ぴょ /pyo/ [pjo] |
| /b/ | ば /ba/ [ba] | び /bi/ [bi] | ビ /bɿ/ [b^{z}ɨ] | ぶ /bu/ [bu] | べ /be/ [be] | ぼ /bo/ [bo] | ビェ /bə/ [bə] | びゃ /bya/ [bja] | びゅ /byu/ [bju] | びょ /byo/ [bjo] |
| /m/ | ま /ma/ [ma] | み /mi/ [mi] | ミ゚ /mɿ/ [mɨ] | む /mu/ [mu] | め /me/ [me] | も /mo/ [mo] | ミ゚ェ /mə/ [mə] | みゃ /mya/ [mja] | みゅ /myu/ [mju] | みょ /myo/ [mjo] |
| /f/ | ふぁ /fa/ [fa] | ふぃ /fi/ [fi] | ふィ゚ /fɿ/ [fɨ] | ふ /fu/ [fu] | ふぇ /fe/ [fe] | ふぉ /fo/ [fo] | ふェ /fə/ [fə] | | | |
| /v/ | ヴぁ /va/ [va] | ヴぃ /vi/ [vi] | ヴィ゚ /vɿ/ [vɨ] | ヴぅ /vu/ [vu] | ヴぇ /ve/ [ve] | ヴぉ /vo/ [vo] | ヴェ /və/ [və] | | | |
| /ʋ/ | わ /ʋa/ [ʋa] | | | | | を /ʋo/ [ʋo] | | | | |
| /r/* | ら /ra/ [ɾa] | り /ri/ [ɾi] | | る /ru/ [ɾu] | れ /re/ [ɾe] | ろ /ro/ [ɾo] | | りゃ /rya/ [ɾja] | りゅ /ryu/ [ɾju] | りょ /ryo/ [ɾjo] |
| | ん /N/ [n, ŋ] | ム /M/ [m] | ヴ /V/ [v] | リ゚ /ɭ/ [ɭ] | ー /ː/ [ː] | っ (final) /ʔ/ [ʔ] | | っ /Q/ [k, g, s, dz, ɕ, dʑ, t, d, tɕ, b, p, f] | | |

* Geminates as /ɭɭ/ [ɭɭ].
