= Kurima dialect =

Japonic language spoken in Miyako Islands

Kurima
- Ffima-ftsɨ
- Native to: Japan
- Region: Kurima Island, Okinawa Prefecture
- Native speakers: 30~50 (2025)
- Language family: Japonic: Ryukyuan; Southern Ryukyuan; Miyakoan; Kurima
- Writing system: Japanese

Language codes
- ISO 639-3: None (mis)
- Glottolog: kuri1272
- Kurima is classified as Severely Endangered by the UNESCO Atlas of the World's Languages in Danger

Kurima (Ffima-ftsɨ) is a dialect of the Miyakoan language, a Ryukyuan language spoken on the island of Kurima, one of the Miyako Islands of Japan. As a moribund language, currently Kurima is only spoken natively by elderly people. It is recognized by UNESCO as a severely endangered language.

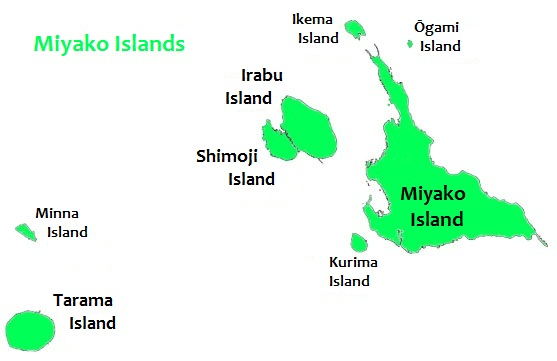
Location of Kurima within the Miyako Islands

== Sociolinguistics ==
The offshore island of Kurima is inhabited by 161 people (as March 2021 per government report) with half of the population aged 65 or older and only 9 children. The island has been facing steep demographic decline over the last 40 years, dropping from 250 in 1983, to 161 in 2021. Severe depopulation forced the island's last education facility to close in 2020. Conservation and revitalization efforts often face difficult challenges as younger generations have increasingly shifted to Japanese while most of the current speakers are aged 50 and over, further enhancing the risk of extinction.

== Phonology ==
=== Vowels ===
Kurima contrasts six vowel qualities.

	Front		Central		Back	
	short	long	short	long	short	long
Close	i	iː	ɨ	ɨː	u	uː
Mid	e	eː			o	oː
Open			a	aː		

- The diphthongs in Kurima are /ai̯ ui̯/.

=== Consonants ===
		Labial	Alveolar		(Alveolo-) Palatal	Velar	Glottal
		Labial	plain	sibilant	(Alveolo-) Palatal	Velar	Glottal
Nasal		m	n				
Plosive/ Affricate	voiceless	p	t	ts	tɕ	k	
Plosive/ Affricate	voiced	b	d	dz	dʑ	g	
Fricative	voiceless	f		s	ɕ		(h)
Fricative	voiced	v		z	ʑ		
Liquid			ɾ		j	w	

=== Word stress ===
Stress in Kurima is highly pragmatic: it correlates with theme topicalization, H pitch occurs wherever lexical items that are considered topical of the discourse. Pitch is not specified at a lexical level. However, older reports from the 1960s described the Kurima accent system as stable and predictable one-pattern system but was shifting towards accentless type.

Compared to other Ryukyuan languages, Kurima has lost the three-way accent distinction of Proto-Ryukyuan as with most other varieties, except for Ikema, Minna, and Tarama, which preserve the contrast.

== Morphosyntax ==
Like any other Japonic languages, Kurima word order in phrases is head-final SOV. As a dependent-head language, Kurima morphosyntax heavily relies on nominal case markings to define syntactic roles for certain arguments in the clause and relationship with the predicate.

In an intransitive clause, the subject argument occupies the preverbal position of the predicate.

fu-taːzz-a ur-an
two-person.CLF-TOP be-NEG.NPST
'Those two are missing.'

In a transitive clause, the prototypical order is transitive subject/agent argument–object argument–predicate.

anna-a mainitsɨ-du sɨmuttɕu-u jum
mother-TOP every.day-FOC book-ACC read
'My mom reads books every day.'

Infrequently, the object argument can be moved to the preceding position of the subject argument if the object is considered topical.

ku-nu zzu-Ø-ba anna-ga-du fo-o
This-GEN fish-ACC-TOP mother-Nom-FOC eat-NPST
'As for this fish, it's mother that will eat it.'
