= Ogami Island =

One of the Miyako Islands within the Ryukyu Islands

Ōgami Island
Native name: Ukam
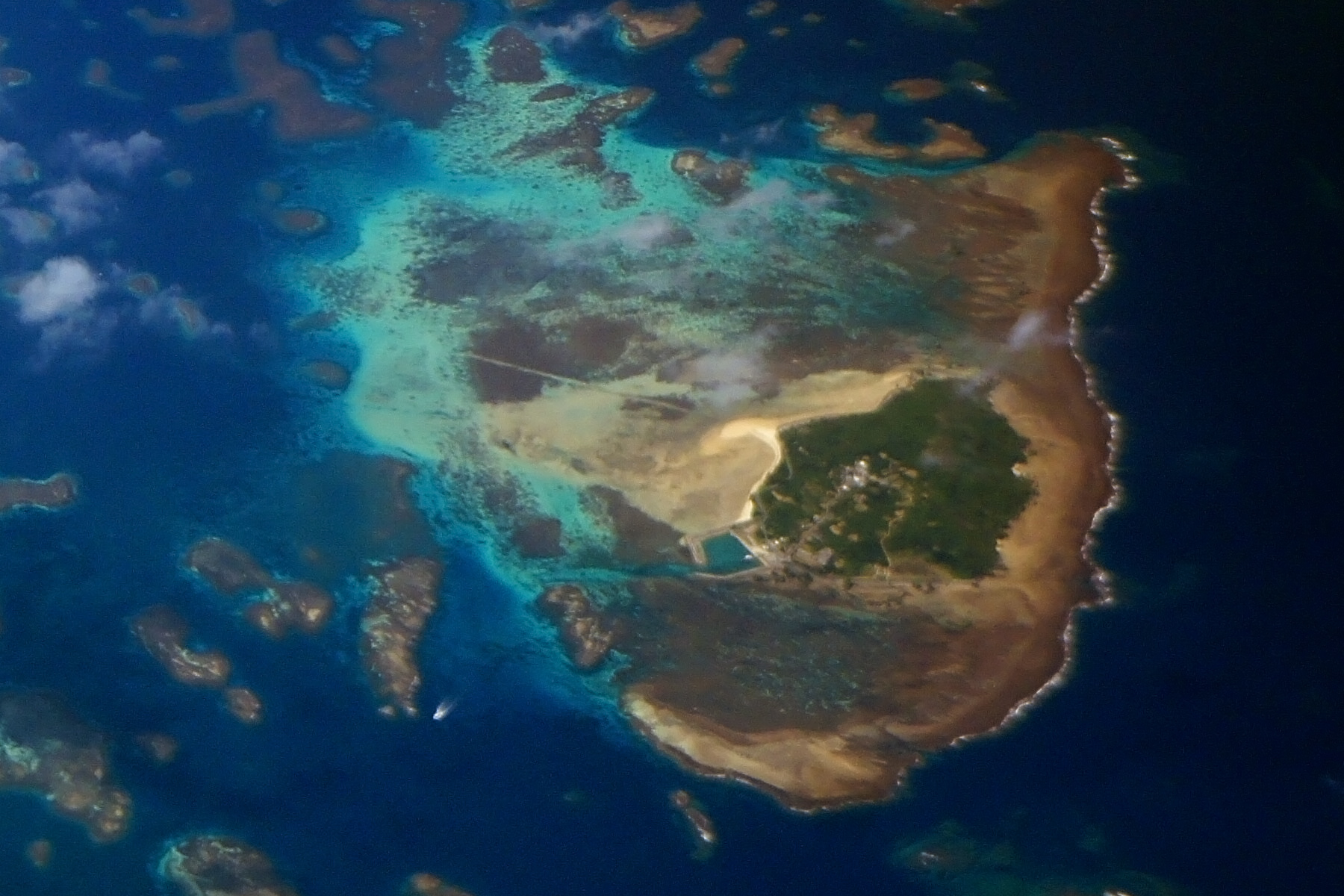
- Aerial view of Ōgami-jima

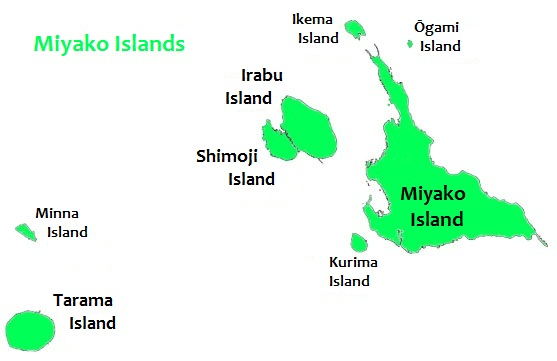
- Ōgami Island is north of Miyako Island, and east of Ikema Island

Geography
- Location: Okinawa Prefecture
- Coordinates: 24°54′59.4″N 125°18′28.6″E
- Archipelago: Miyako Islands
- Total islands: 1
- Area: 0.24 km^{2} (0.093 sq mi)

Administration
- Japan

Demographics
- Population: 35 (2019)
- Pop. density: 145.83/km^{2} (377.7/sq mi)
- Ethnic groups: Ryukyuan, Japanese

Ōgami Island (Japanese: 大神島; Miyako: Ukam) is one of the islands of the Miyako Islands. It is about 4km north of Miyako-jima (island) and belongs to Miyakojima City, which was created in 2005 by a merger of many smaller towns on the island chain. Before the merger, it belonged to Hirara City. The area is 0.24 km^{2}, and the population is 35.

== Transportation ==
The island has no airport and is not connected by bridge to any other island. The only way to reach it is to take a boat from Miyako-jima. There are four round-trip boat rides per day and it takes around 15 minutes per trip.

== Population ==
Settlements are concentrated on the south coast of the island, near the port. There is also another settlement near the center of the island, at the highest point.

== Economy ==
The island's economy is based on fishing, with dried octopus being a specialty. In recent years, the island has tried to promote tourism by setting up a tourism website.

== Demographics ==
The population of the islands is approximately 35 people, most of whom are elderly. The island's population is expected to decrease as residents age.

== Language ==
Older residents speak the Ōgami dialect, a dialect of Miyakoan that is phonologically different from other Miyakoan dialects. Like Miyakoan itself, the dialect is in danger of dying out as younger residents do not speak it.

== Gallery ==
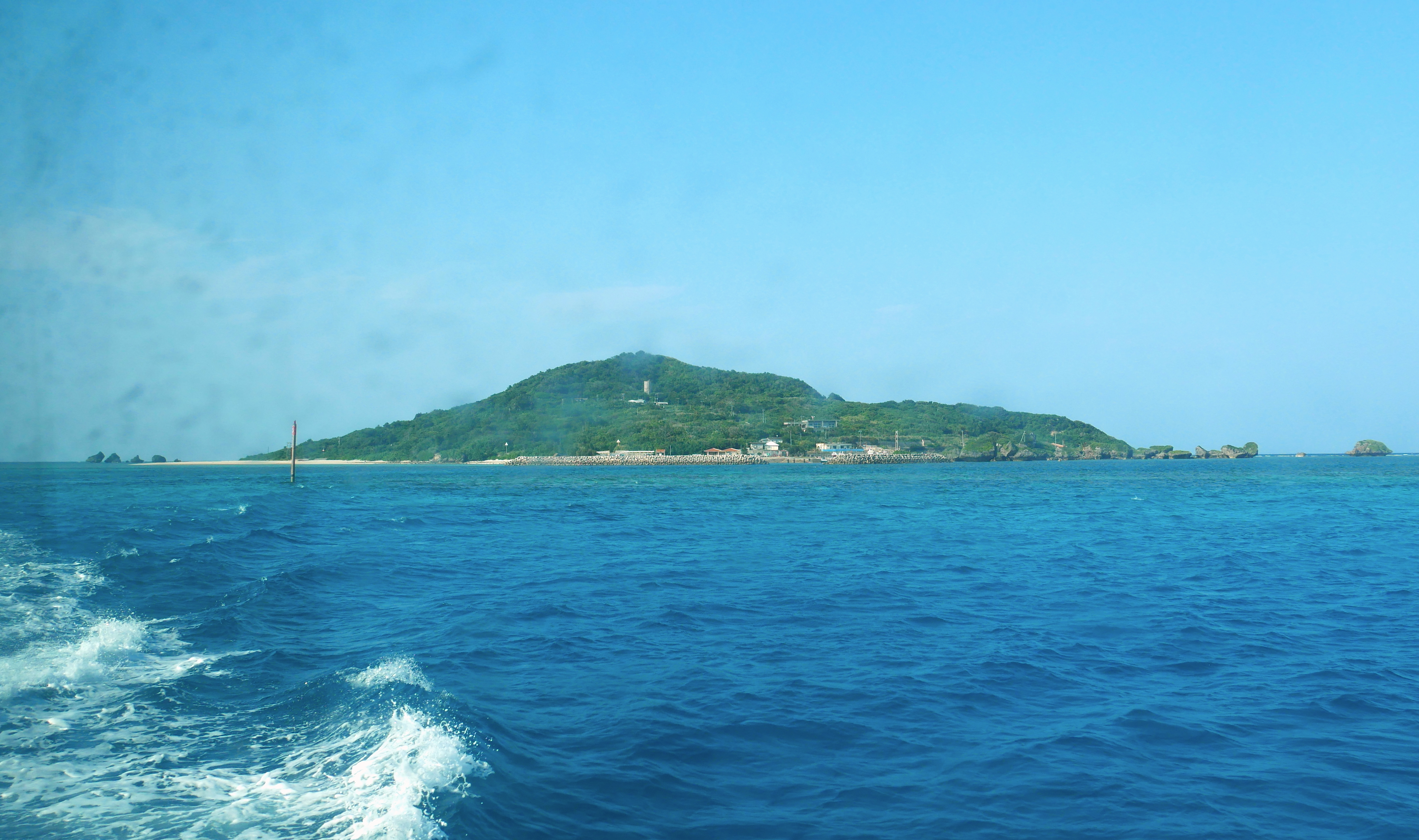
The Island seen from a distance

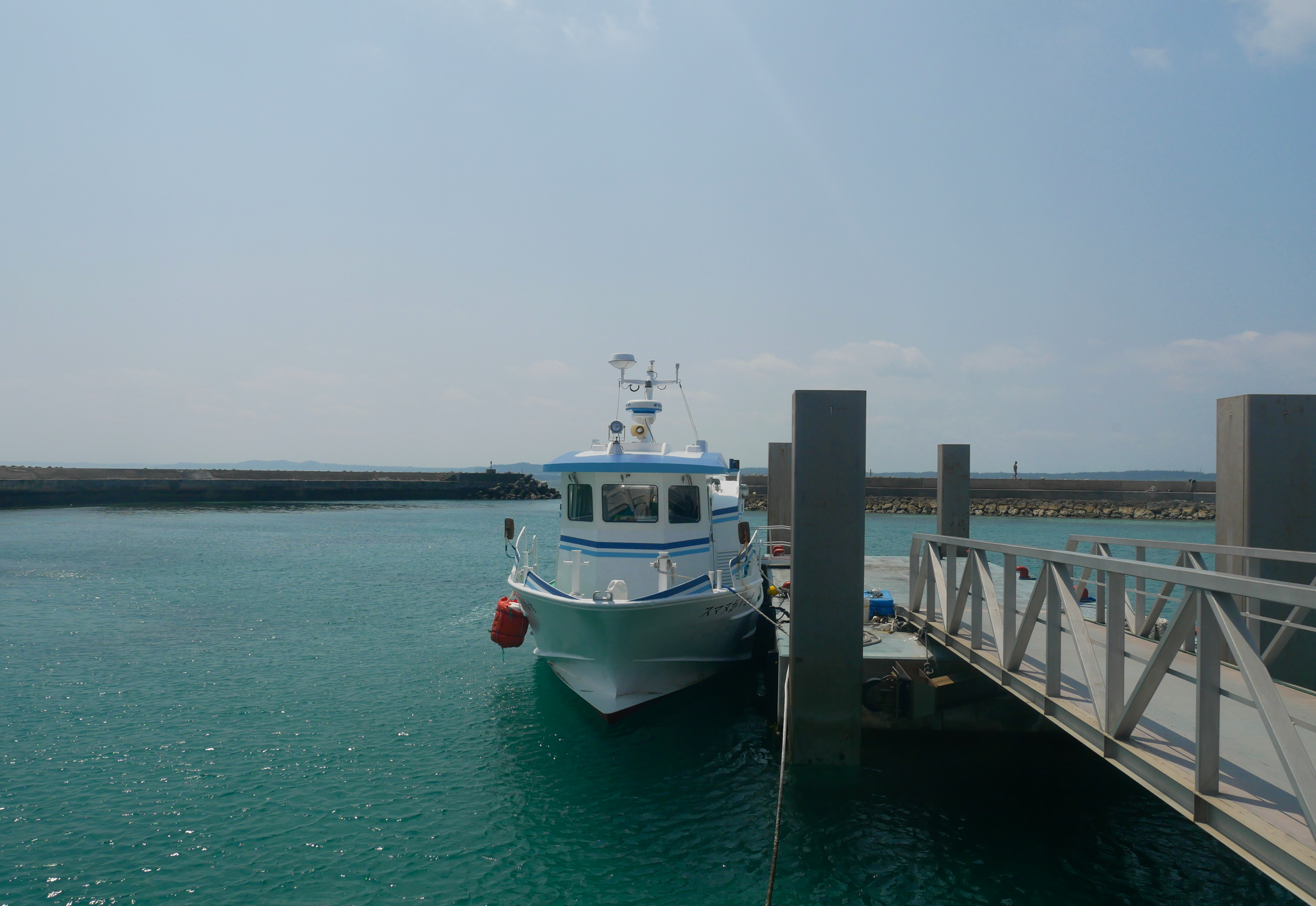
The port and a boat

Several views, 2020

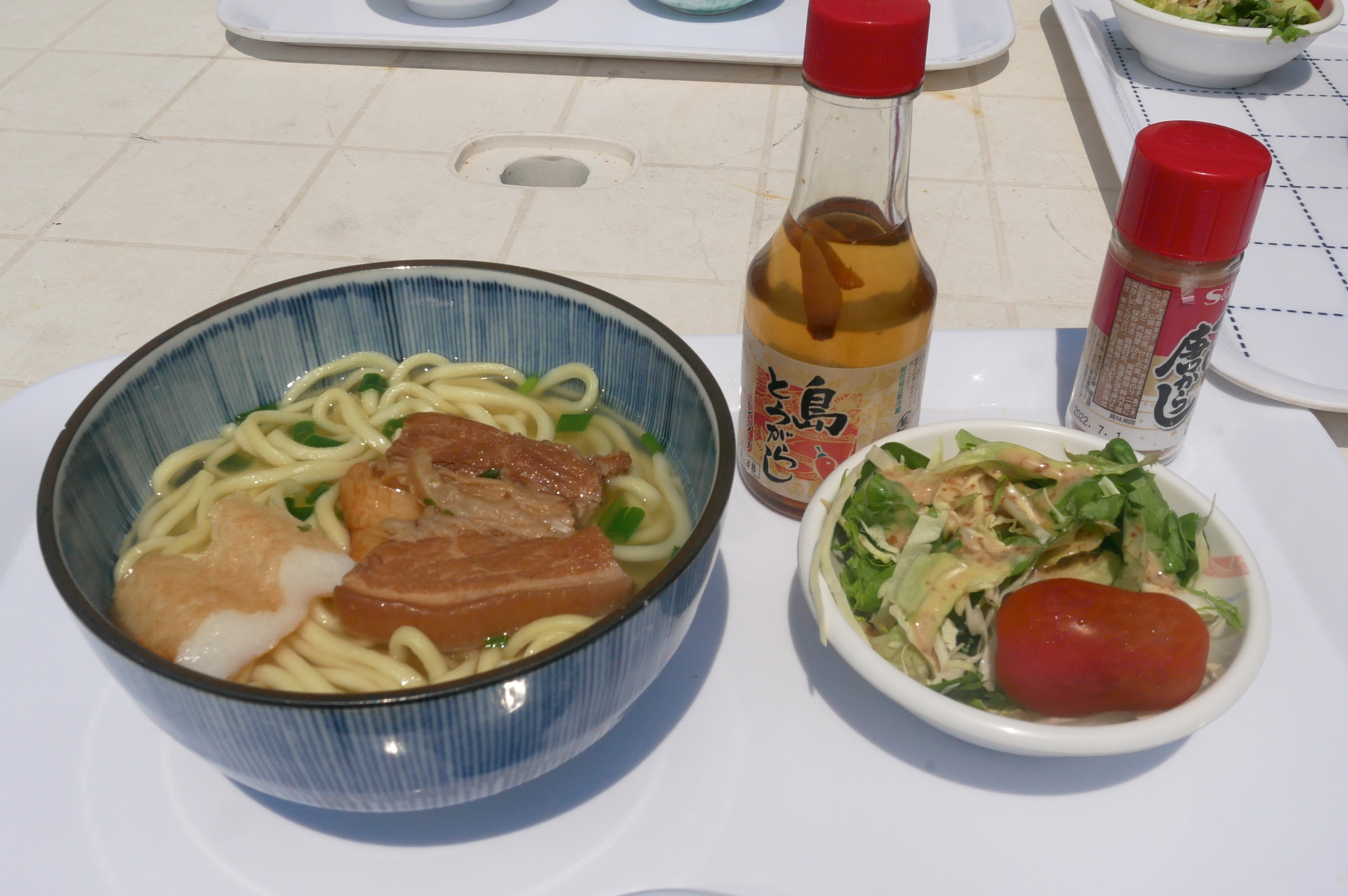
Local food

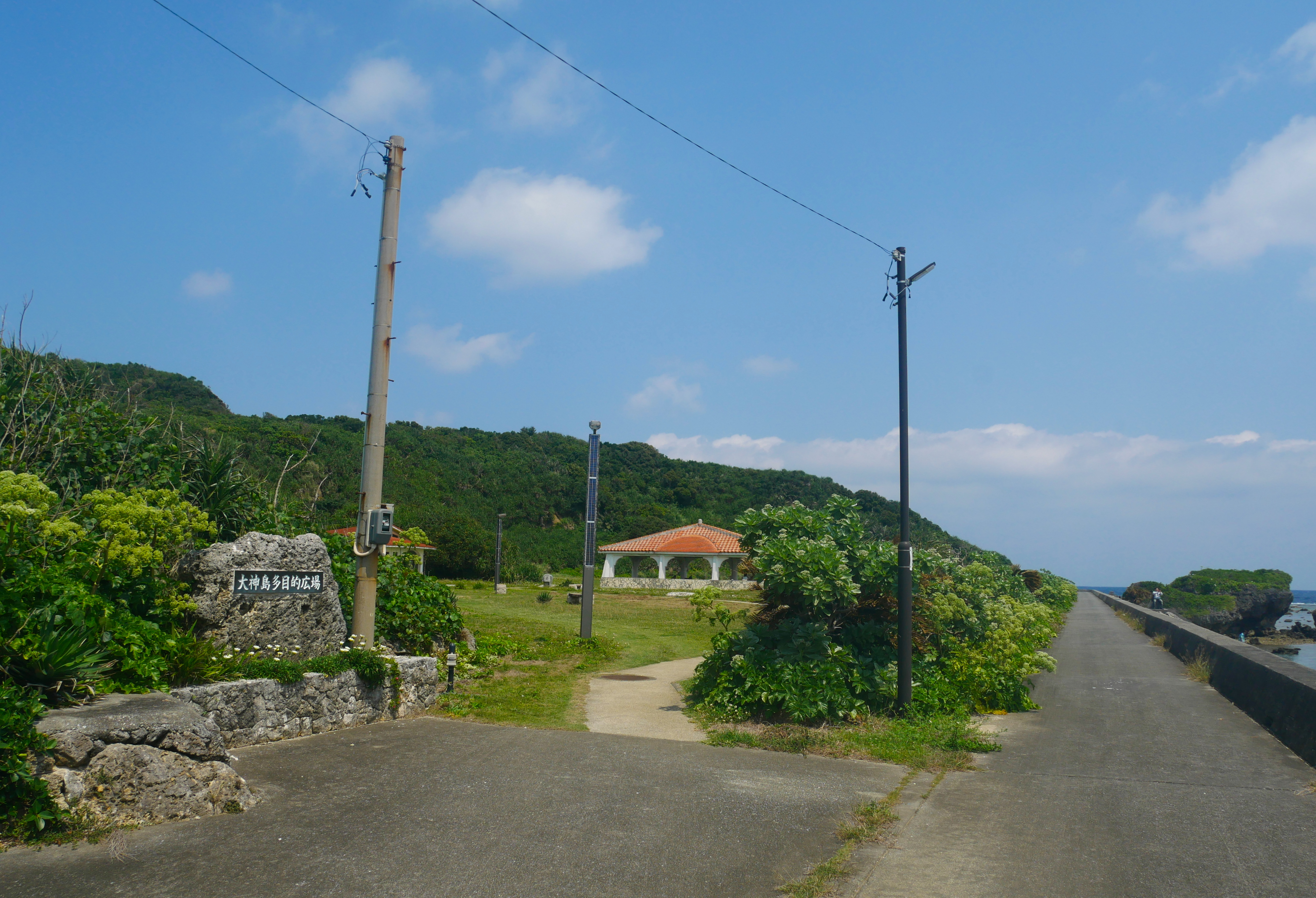
A road near the port

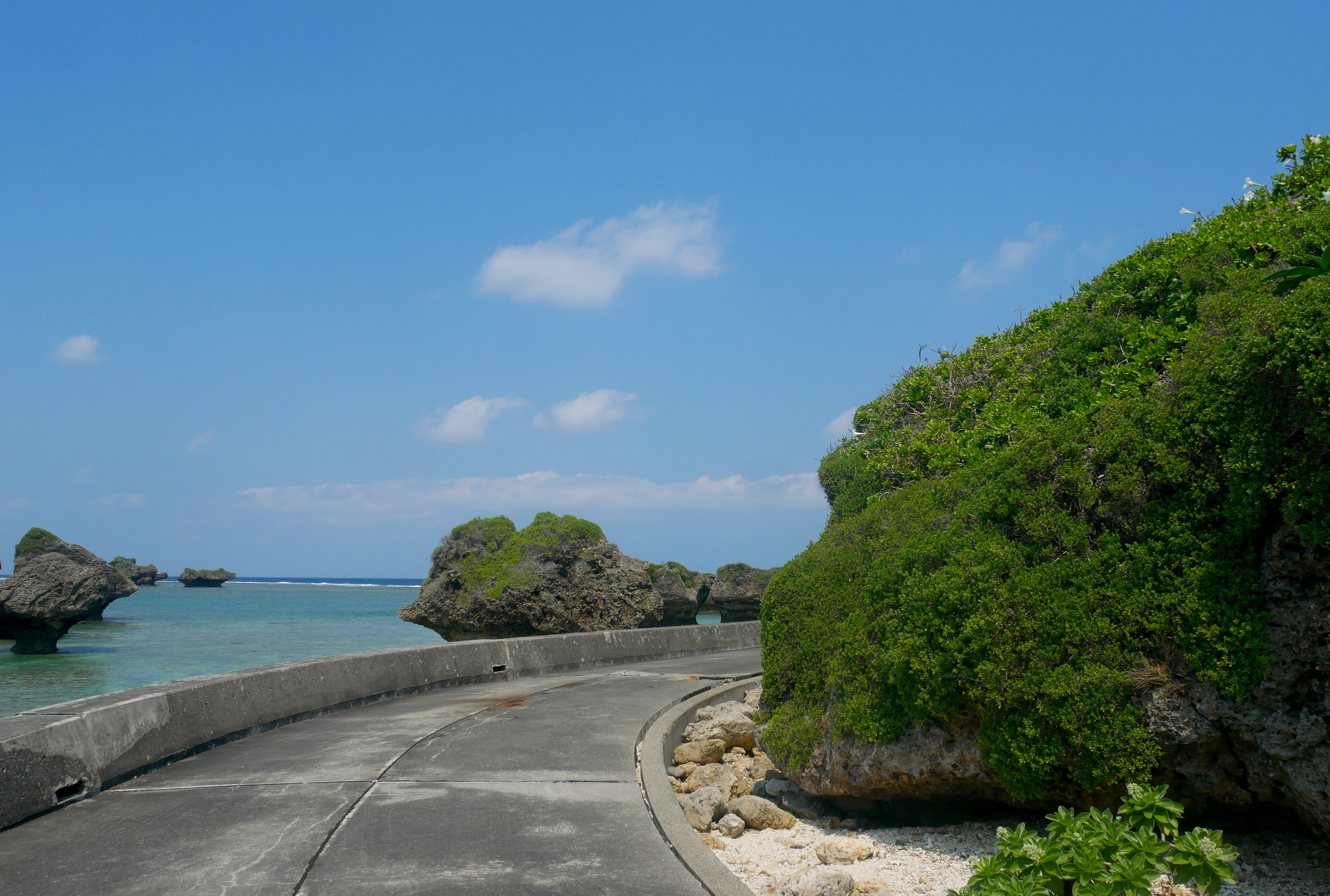
Curved road and view

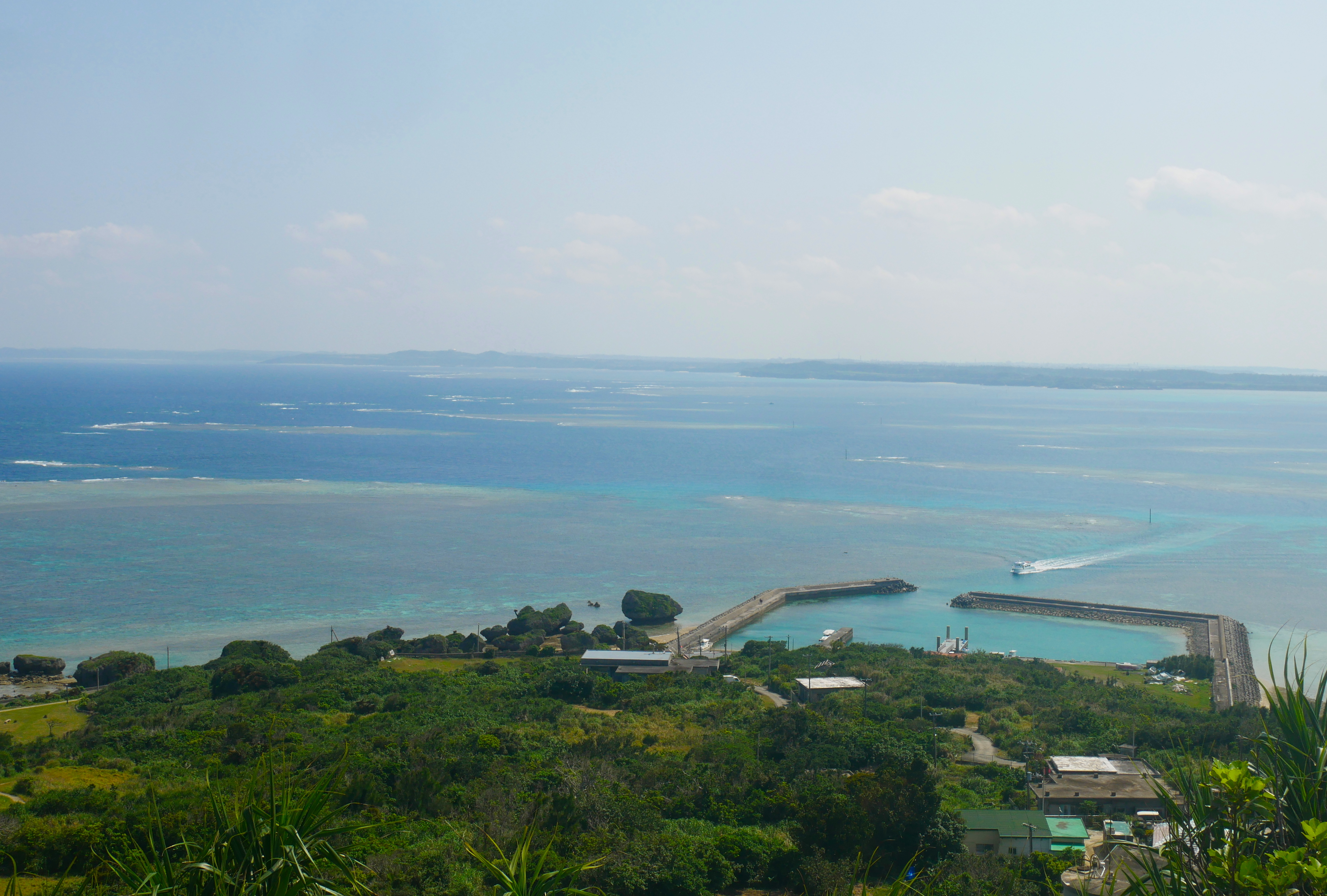
View of the port from the highest point on the island
