= Kurima-jima =

Island within Ryukyu Islands

Kurima Island
Native name: Ffima
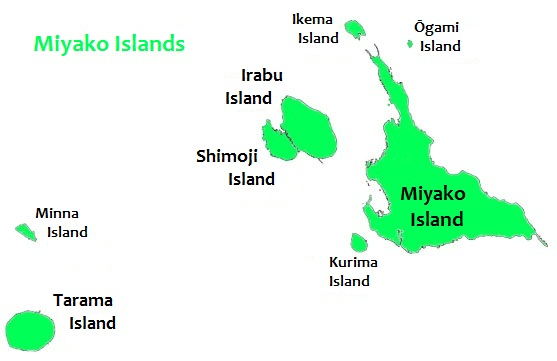
- Kurima-jima is located 1.5 km southwest of Miyako-jima

- Location within Japan

Geography
- Location: Okinawa Prefecture
- Coordinates: 24°43′20.47″N 125°14′49.10″E
- Archipelago: Miyako Islands
- Area: 2.84 km^{2} (1.10 sq mi)

Administration
- Japan
- Okinawa Prefecture

Demographics
- Population: 161 (2015 national census)
- Ethnic groups: Ryukyuan, Japanese

Kurima Island (来間島, Miyako: Ffima) is one of the Miyako Islands of Okinawa Prefecture, Japan. It is connected to the southeastern end of the Yonaha Maehama beach on the Miyako-jima island via 1,690 metres (1.05 miles) Kurima Bridge (来間大橋), which was opened on 13 March 1995.

== Gallery ==
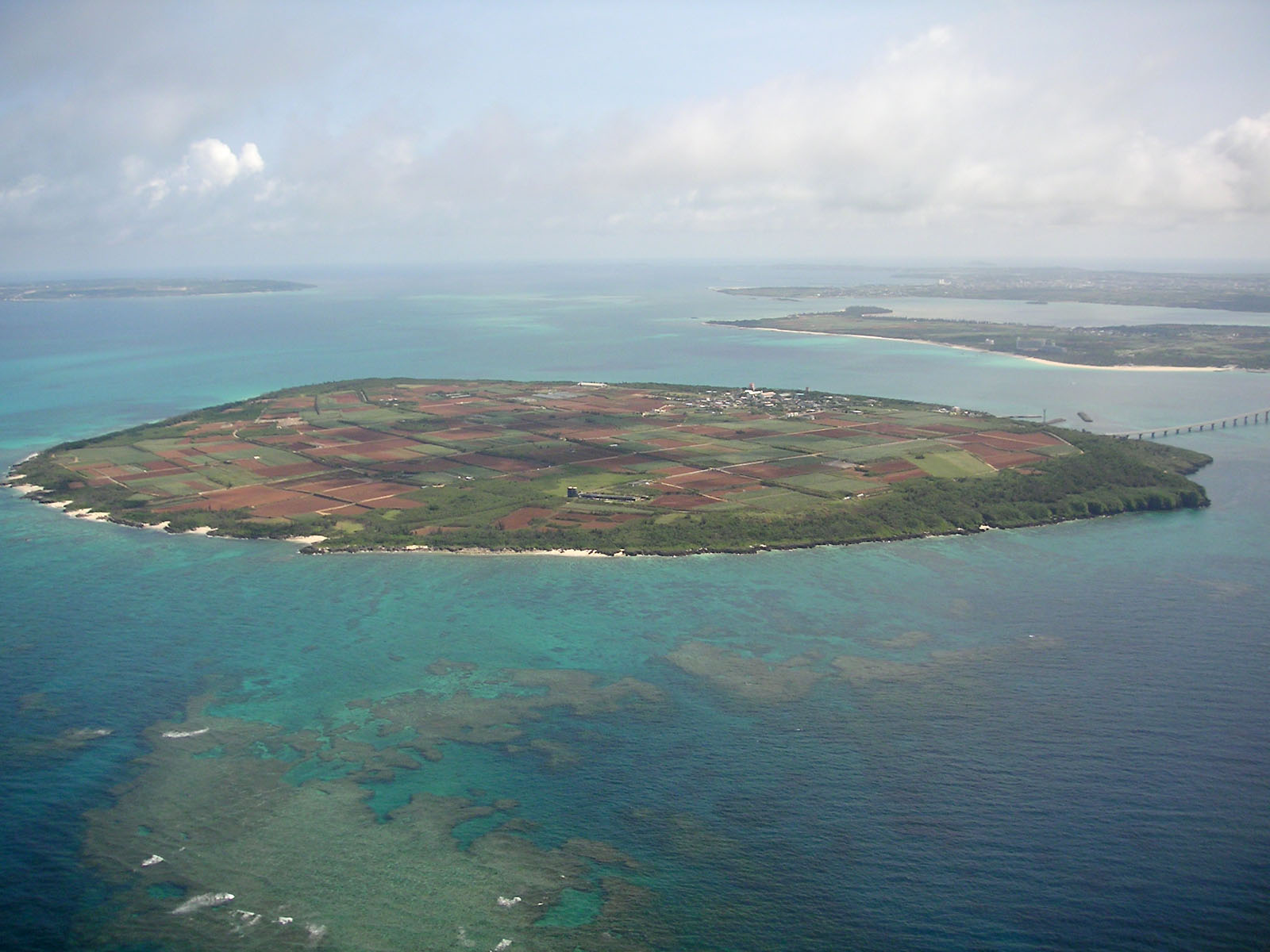
Kurima-jima

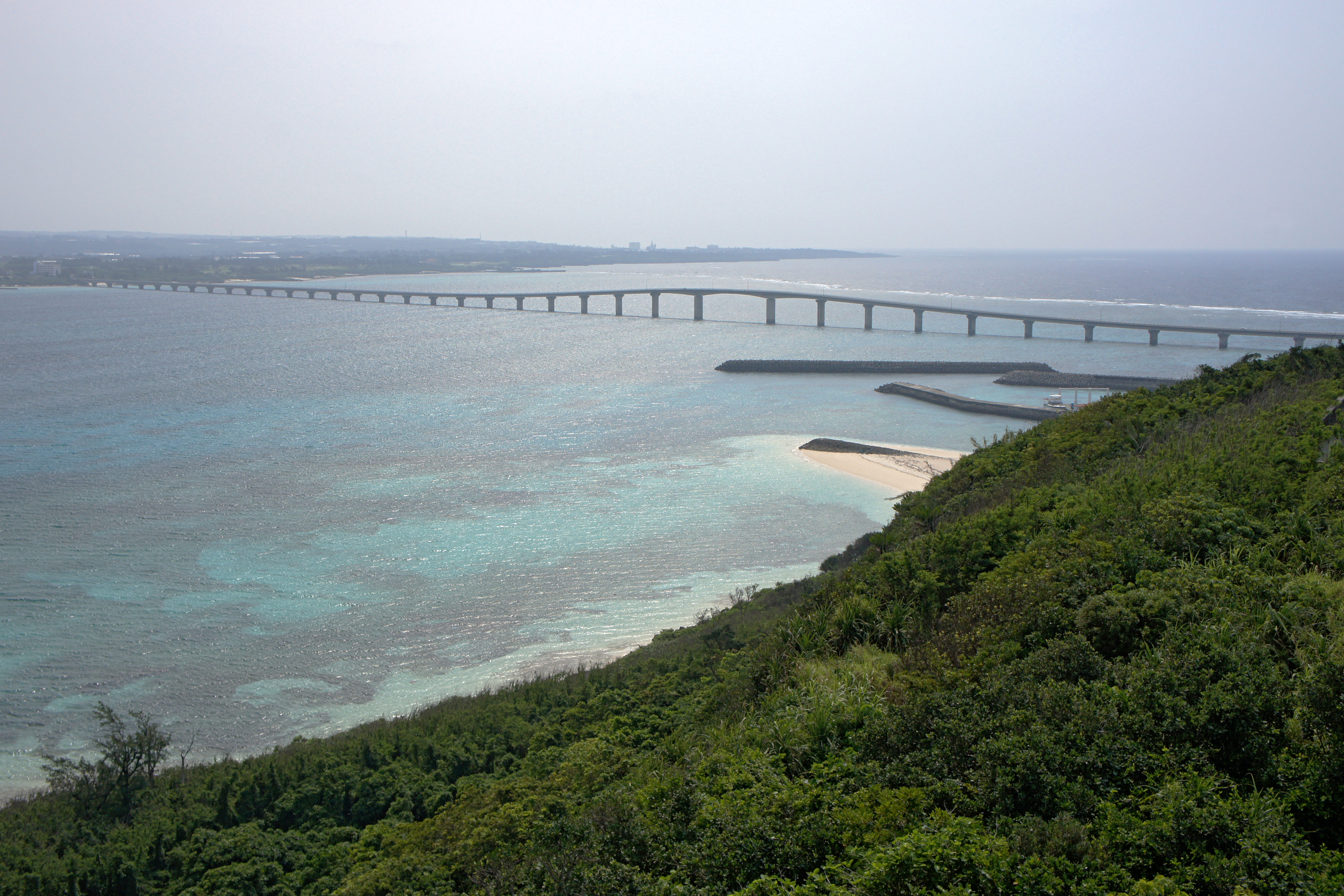
Bridge from Kurima-jima to Miyako-jima

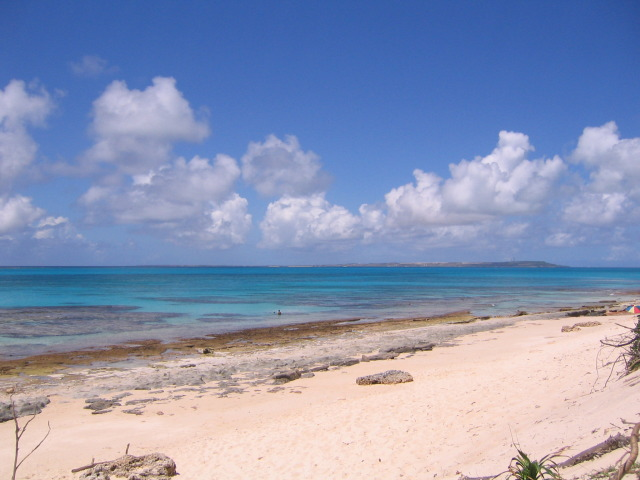
Beach on Kurima island
