= Kurima, Yahukimo =

Kurima
- District
- Kurima is located roughly 19 kilometers south east of Wamena. Kurima (Indonesia)
- Coordinates: 4.226781°S 139.049746°E
- Country: Indonesia
- Province: Highland Papua
- Regency: Yahukimo
- Capital: Obolma

Government
  - Kepala Distrik: Ernius Meage

Area
  - Total: 605 km^{2} (234 sq mi)

Population (2020)
  - Total: 18,240
  - Density: 30.1/km^{2} (78.1/sq mi)
- Time zone: UTC+9 (Indonesia Eastern Time)

Kurima is a district and a valley located in the highlands of Western New Guinea, in Highland Papua, Indonesia.

== Geography ==
The boundaries of the Kurima District are as follows:

North	Mugi District
South	Tangma District
West	Asolokobal District, Jayawijaya Regency
East	Werima District
