= Miyakoan language =

Ryukyuan dialect cluster of the Miyako Islands

Miyakoan
- 宮古口/ミャークフツ Myākufutsu
- Pronunciation: [mjaːkufutss̩]
- Native to: Okinawa, Japan
- Region: Miyako Islands
- Ethnicity: 66,000 (2020)
- Native speakers: (mostly over age 20 cited 1989)
- Language family: Japonic: Ryukyuan; Southern; Miyakoan
- Dialects: Miyako Island; Ōgami; Ikema-Irabu; Tarama; Kurima
- Writing system: Japanese

Language codes
- ISO 639-3: mvi
- Glottolog: miya1259
- ELP: Miyako
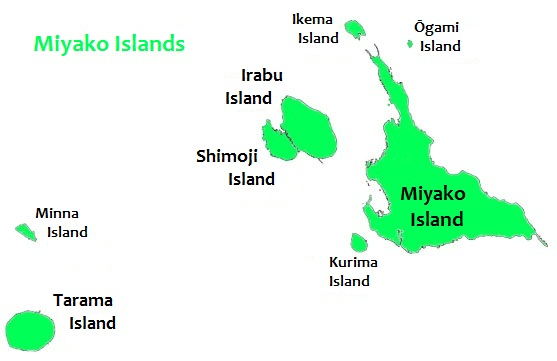

- Miyakoan is classified as Definitely Endangered by the UNESCO Atlas of the World's Languages in Danger.

A Miyakoan speaker, recorded in the United States

The Miyakoan language (宮古口/ミャークフツ Myākufutsu/Myākufutsї [mjaːkufutss̩] or 島口/スマフツ Sumafutsu/Sїmafutsї, Japanese: 宮古語, romanized: Miyako-go) is a diverse dialect cluster spoken in the Miyako Islands, located southwest of Okinawa. The combined population of the islands is about 52,000 (as of 2011). Miyakoan is a Southern Ryukyuan language, most closely related to Yaeyama. As of 2025, the number of competent native speakers is not definitively known. As a consequence of the Japanese government's Japanese language policy, which has traditionally referred to the language as 宮古方言 (Miyako hōgen), or simply a dialect of standard Japanese, it is not taught or used in schools. As a result, most people born after 1970 tend to not use the language except in songs and rituals, and the younger generation almost exclusively uses Japanese as their first language. UNESCO classified Miyakoan as a "definitely endangered" language in its Atlas of the World's Languages in Danger in February, 2009. The Endangered Languages Project currently classifies the language as "severely endangered."

Miyakoan is notable among the Japonic languages in that it allows non-nasal syllable-final consonants, something not found in most Japonic languages.

== Dialects ==
The most divergent is the Tarama language, spoken on Tarama, Okinawa, the farthest island away. The other dialects cluster as Ikema–Irabu and Central Miyako. Given the low degree of mutual intelligibility, Tarama language is sometimes considered a distinct language in its own right.

An illustrative lexeme is the plant name for Alocasia. This varies as Central Miyako (Hirara, Ōgami) /biʋkasːa/, Ikema /bɯbɯːɡamː/, Irabu (Nagahama) /bɭ̆bɭːɡasːa/, Tarama /bivːuɭ̆ɡasːa/.

A short description of the Aragusuku dialect (spoken in the southeastern area of Miyako Island and not to be confused with the Yaeyama language of the same name) was published in 2022 by Wang Danning.

A descriptive grammar of Kurima dialect was published in 2024 by Alexandra Jarosz.

== Phonology ==
The description here is mostly based on the Ōgami dialect, the Central Miyakoan dialect of the smallest of the Miyako islands, from Pellard (2009). There is additional description based on the Irabu dialect, the Ikema-Irabu dialect of the second largest of the Irabu islands.

Central Miyakoan dialects do not have pitch accent; therefore, they are of ikkei type, except for the dialects of Ikema, Karimata, Uechi, and Yonaha, which have at most three types of pitch accent. Tarama distinguishes three types of accent on the phonological word (stem plus clitics), e.g. /juda꞊mai neen/, /jadu꞊maiꜜ neen/, /maduꜜ꞊mai neen/,

Historical /*i *u/ centralized and merged to /ɨ/ as /*e *o/ rose to /i u/. The blade of the tongue in /ɨ/ is close to the alveolar ridge, and this feature has been inaccurately described as "apical" (it is actually laminal). In certain environments /ɨ/ rises beyond vowel space to syllabic [s̩] after /p k/ (especially before another voiced consonant) and, in dialects that have voiced stops, to [z̩] after /b ɡ/:

*pito > pstu 'person', *kimo > ksmu 'liver', *tabi > tabz 'journey' in Shimazato dialect.

=== Ōgami ===
==== Vowels ====
There are five vowels in Ōgami.

	Front	Central	Back
Close	i ~ ɪ	ɨ ~ ɯ	u ~ ʊ
Mid	ɛ ~ æ		
Open	ɛ ~ æ		ɑ

- /ɯ/ is truly unrounded, unlike the compressed Japanese /ɯᵝ/. It is centralized [ɨ] after /s/.
- /i u/ may be realized as near-close [ɪ ʊ].
- /ɛ/ varies from close-mid [e] to near-open [æ].

Numerous vowel sequences occur, and long vowels are treated as sequences of identical vowels, keeping the inventory at five.

Ōgami vowels other than /ɨ/ are not subject to devoicing next to unvoiced consonants the way Japanese high vowels are. Sequences of phonetic consonants have been analyzed by Pellard (2009) as being phonemically consonantal as well.

==== Consonants ====
Unlike most Miyakoan dialects, Ōgami lacks a voicing contrast.

	Labial	Coronal	Dorsal
Nasal	m	n ~ ŋ	
Plosive	p	t	k ~ x
Fricative	f	s ~ ɕ	k ~ x
Liquid	v ~ ʋ	ɾ	(j)

- There is a length distinction for /m n f s ʋ/; geminate plosives do not occur, apart from a single morpheme, the quotative particle tta.
- /p t k/ tend to be somewhat aspirated [pʰ tʰ kʰ] initially and voiced [b d g] medially. There are maybe a dozen words with optionally voiced initial consonants, such as babe ~ pape 'fish sp.' and gakspstu ~ kakspstu 'glutton', (Note: Less likely is 'wolverine'; the French glouton (like the English 'glutton') can both describe people and be a name for the animal, but the Miyakoan word is glossed as being composed of morphemes meaning "hungry ghost" and "person".) but Pellard suggests they may be loans (babe is found in other dialects, and gaks- is a Chinese loan; only a single word gama ~ kama 'grotto, cave' is not an apparent loan).
- /k/ may be spirantized before /ɑ/: /kɑinɑ/ [kɑinɑ ~ xɑinɑ] 'arm', /ɑkɑ/ [ɑkɑ ~ ɑxɑ ~ ɑɣɑ] 'I (nom.)'.
- /n/ is [ŋ] word-finally, and assimilates [m ~ n ~ ŋ] to following consonants. When final [ŋ] geminates, it becomes [nː]; compare /tin/ [tiŋ] 'silver' with /tinnu/ [tinːu] 'silver (acc.)'. It tends to devoice after /f s/.
- /m/, on the other hand, does not assimilate and appears finally unchanged: [mku] 'right', [mtɑ] 'earth', [im] 'sea'.
- /s/ palatalizes to [ɕ] before /i ɛ/: /pssi/ [pɕːi] 'cold'.
- Some speakers insert an epenthetic [t] in /ns/ sequences, as in /ɑnsi/ [ɑnɕi ~ ɑntɕi] 'thus'.
- /ʋ/ tends to become a fricative [v] when emphasized or when geminated, as in /kuʋʋɑ/ [kuvːɑ] 'calf'. It can be syllabic: vv [v̩ː] 'to sell'. Final /ʋ/ contrasts with the close back vowels: /pɑʋ/ 'snake', /pɑu/ 'stick', /pɑɯ/ 'fly'.
- [j] is mainly heard in complementary distribution with /i/, only occurring before /u ɑ/.

==== Phonotactics ====
In Ōgami Ryukyuan, any continuant except /ɾ/ can be syllabic: vowels as well as /m n f s ʋ/ can assume the function of syllable nucleus. Syllabic segments, geminate consonants and codas each bear a mora, and long vowels as well as long syllabic consonants bear two morae. The segments that can bear a mora are thus /i ɯ u ɛ ɑ m n f s ʋ/, i.e. all continuants but /ɾ/.

All consonants as well as the vowel /i/ can be syllable onsets, and the sonorants /m n ʋ/ can also appear in the coda. There are no long or complex onsets nor codas, and there are no medial glides. The syllabic consonants are also subject to restrictions on their possible onsets:

- the sonorant consonants /m n ʋ/ cannot have an onset;
- /s/ can only have /p k/ as its onset;
- /f/ can only have /k/ as its onset.

Various sequences of consonants occur (mna 'shell', sta 'under', fta 'lid'), and long consonants are bimoraic (sta [s̩.tɑ] fta [f̩.tɑ], pstu [ps̩.tu]), so they are analyzed as consonant sequences as well. These can be typologically unusual:

/mmtɑ/ '(sp. small fruit)'
/nnɑmɑ/ 'now'
/ʋʋɑ/ 'you'
/fɑɑ/ 'baby'
/ffɑ/ 'grass'
/fffɑ/ 'comb.TOP' (from /ff/ 'comb') (Note: /ff/ derives historically from /fusi/, but there is no indication of vowels in the Ōgami word.)
/suu/ 'vegetable'
/ssu/ 'white'
/sssu/ 'dust.ACC' (from /ss/ 'dust')
/mmɑ/ 'mother'
/mmmɑ/ 'potato.TOP' (from /mm/ 'potato')
/pssmɑ/ 'day'

Ōgami Ryukyuan is very unique within the Japonic family as it allows words to be constituted by voiceless consonants only, a typologically very uncommon feature, reported hitherto for only a handful of languages in the world (e.g. Nuxalk, Oowekyala and Shilha):

/ss/ 'dust, a nest, to rub'
/kss/ 'breast/milk, hook, to fish, to come'
/pss/ 'day, vulva'
/ff/ 'a comb, to bite, to rain, to close'
/kff/ 'to make'
/fks/ 'to build'
/ksks/ 'month, to listen, to arrive', etc.
/sks/ 'to cut'
/psks/ 'to pull'

The contrast between a voiceless syllable and a voiced vowel between voiceless consonants can be seen in kff puskam [k͡f̩ːpuskɑm] 'I want to make (it)', ff꞊nkɑi [f̩ːŋɡɑi] 'to꞊the.comb', and paks꞊nu꞊tu [pɑksn̥udu] 'bee꞊NOM꞊FOC (with a devoiced nasal after s). There is a contrast between ff꞊mɑi 'comb꞊INCL' and ffu꞊mɑi 'shit꞊INCL'. With tongue twisters, speakers do not insert schwas or other voiced sounds to aid in pronunciation:

/kff ff/ 'the comb that I make'
/kff ss/ 'the nest that I make'
/kff kss/ 'the hook that I make'

The minimal word is either VV, VC, or CC (consisting of a single geminate), as in aa 'millet', ui 'over', is 'rock', ff 'comb'. There are no V or CV words; however, CCV and CVV words are found, as shown above. Syllabification is difficult to analyze, especially in words such as usnkai (us-nkai) 'cow-dir' and saiafn (saiaf-n) 'carpenter-DAT'.

=== Irabu ===
==== Vowels ====
In Irabu there are four main vowels and two rare mid vowels that occur in loanwords and some clitics.

	Front		Central		Back	
	short	long	short	long	short	long
Close	i	iː	ɨ	ɨː	u	uː
Mid	(e)	(eː)			(o)	(oː)
Open			a	aː		

==== Consonants ====
There are 15 to 16 consonants in Irabu, which do have a voicing contrast.

		Labial	Alveolar		Palatal	Velar	Glottal
		Labial	plain	sibilant	Palatal	Velar	Glottal
Nasal	short	m	n		(ɲ)	(ŋ)	
Nasal	long	mː	nː				
Plosive/ Affricate	voiceless	p	t	ts	(tʃ)	k	
Plosive/ Affricate	voiced	b	d	dz		g	
Fricative	voiceless	f		s	(ʃ)		(h)
Fricative	voiced	(v)		z			
Approximant	short	ʋ	ɾ	z̞	j	w	
Approximant	long	ʋː	ɾː	z̞ː			

- The sequences ⟨sj, cj⟩ are pronounced as [ʃ, tʃ].
- Sequences ⟨rr, žž⟩ are heard as [ɭː, z̞z].
- /n/ is pronounced as a velar nasal [ŋ] when preceding /k/.
- /ʋ/ is heard as [v] within consonant clusters.
- /n/ can be heard as [ɲ] when preceding /i/ or /j/.
- ⟨ž⟩ is phonetically an approximant [z̞], i.e. a less-fricated [z].
- /ɾ/ in word-final position is heard as [ɭ].
- /z̞/ is devoiced to [s̞] when occurring after the voiceless bilabial plosive [p].
- Palatalization [ʲ] occurs when consonants are preceding a palatal glide /j/ or a high-front /i/ (i.e. /mj, kj/; [mʲ, kʲ])
- Syllabic nasal sounds [m̩, n̩, (ŋ̍)], are heard in word-initial position when preceding consonants.

== Orthography ==
Miyakoan Orthography
	/i/	/ɿ/	/e/	/a/	/o/	/u/	/ja/	/jo/	/ju/	/wa/
/Ø/	い /i/ [i]	イ゜ /ɿ/ [^{z}ɨ]	え /e/ [e]	あ /a/ [a]	お /o/ [o]	う /u/ [u]	や /ja/ [ja]	よ /jo/ [jo]	ゆ /ju/ [ju]	わ /wa/ [wa]
/k/	き /ki/ [ki]	キ゜ /kɿ/ [k^{s}ɨ]	け /ke/ [ke]	か /ka/ [ka]	こ /ko/ [ko]	く /ku/ [ku]	きゃ /kja/ [kja]	きょ /kjo/ [kjo]	きゅ /kju/ [kju]	くゎ /kwa/ [kwa]
/g/	ぎ /gi/ [gi]	ギ /gɿ/ [g^{z}ɨ]	げ /ge/ [ge]	が /ga/ [ga]	ご /go/ [go]	ぐ /gu/ [gu]	ぎゃ /gja/ [gja]	ぎょ /gjo/ [gjo]		
/s/	すぃ /si/ [ʃi]	す /sɿ/ [sɨ]		さ /sa/ [sa]	そ /so/ [so]	すぅ /su/ [su]	しゃ /sja/ [ʃa]	しょ /sjo/ [ʃo]	しゅ /sju/ [ʃu]	
/z/	じ /zi/ [dʒi]	ず /zɿ/ [dzɨ]		ざ /za/ [dza]	ぞ /zo/ [dzo]	ずぅ /zu/ [dzu]	じゃ /zja/ [dʒa]	じょ /zjo/ [dʒo]	じゅ /zju/ [dʒu]	
/c/	ち /ci/ [tʃi]	つ /cɿ/ [tsɨ]		つぁ /ca/ [tsa]		つゅ /cu/ [tsu]	ちゃ /cja/ [tʃa]	ちょ /cjo/ [tʃo]	ちゅ /cju/ [tʃu]	
/t/	てぃ /ti/ [ti]			た /ta/ [ta]	と /to/ [to]	とぅ /tu/ [tu]	てゃ /tja/ [tja]			
/d/	でぃ /di/ [di]			だ /da/ [da]	ど /do/ [do]	どぅ /du/ [du]	でゃ /dja/ [dja]	でょ /djo/ [djo]		
/n/	に /ni/ [ni]		ね /ne/ [ne]	な /na/ [na]	の /no/ [no]	ぬ /nu/ [nu]	にゃ /nja/ [nja]		にゅ /nju/ [nju]	
/f/	ふぃ /fi/ [fi]			ふぁ /fa/ [fa]	ふぉ /fo/ [fo]	ふ /fu/ [fu]	/fja/ [fja]			
/v/	ヴぃ /vi/ [vi]			ヴぁ /va/ [va]						
/p/	ぴ /pi/ [pi]	ピ /pɿ/ [p^{s}ɨ]	ぺ /pe/ [pe]	ぱ /pa/ [pa]	ぽ /po/ [po]	ぷ /pu/ [pu]	ぴゃ /pja/ [pja]	ぴょ /pjo/ [pjo]	ぴゅ /pju/ [pju]	
/b/	び /bi/ [bi]	ビ /bɿ/ [b^{z}ɨ]	べ /be/ [be]	ば /ba/ [ba]	ぼ /bo/ [bo]	ぶ /bu/ [bu]	びゃ /bja/ [bja]	びょ /bjo/ [bjo]	びゅ /bju/ [bju]	
/m/	み /mi/ [mi]	ミ゜ /mɿ/ [mɨ]	め /me/ [me]	ま /ma/ [ma]	も /mo/ [mo]	む /mu/ [mu]	みゃ /mja/ [mja]	みょ /mjo/ [mjo]	みゅ /mju/ [mju]	
/r/ (Note: Iitoyo et al. (1984) say that the sound corresponding to this consonant is [r], but according to Nakamoto (1976), this is a plucked sound.)	り /ri/ [ɾi]		れ /re/ [ɾe]	ら /ra/ [ɾa]	ろ /ro/ [ɾo]	る /ru/ [ɾu]	りゃ /rja/ [ɾja]	りょ /rjo/ [ɾjo]		
	ん /N/ [n, ŋ]	ム /M/ [m]	ヴ /V/ [v]	ー /ː/ [ː]	/Q/ [k,s,z,t,c,f,v,p]					

== Bibliography ==
- Eberhard, David M.; Simons, Gary F.; Fennig, Charles D., eds. (2020). Ethnologue: Languages of the World (23rd ed.). Dallas, Texas: SIL International.
- Iitoyo, Koichi; Hino, Sukezumi; Satō, Ryōichi (1984). Okinawa/Amami no hōgen 沖縄・奄美の方言 [Okinawa/Amami Dialects]. Kōza hōgengaku (in Japanese). Vol. 10. Kokusho Kankōkai. pp. 257–259. ISBN 978-4-336-01981-3.
- Pellard, Thomas (2009). Ogami : Éléments de description d'un parler du sud des Ryukyus (PDF) (Docteur de l’EHESS thesis). École des hautes études en sciences sociales.
- Shimoji, Michinori (2008). A grammar of Irabu, a southern Ryukyuan language (PhD thesis). Australian National University. doi:10.25911/5d5fc82596df5. hdl:1885/150638.
- Shimoji, Michinori; Pellard, Thomas, eds. (2010). An Introduction to Ryukyuan Languages. Research Institute for Languages and Cultures of Asia and Africa, Tokyo University of Foreign Studies. hdl:2324/7340499. ISBN 978-4-86337-072-2. This article incorporates text available under the CC BY 4.0 license.
