= Japanese destroyer Shinonome (1898) =

Murakumo-class destroyer

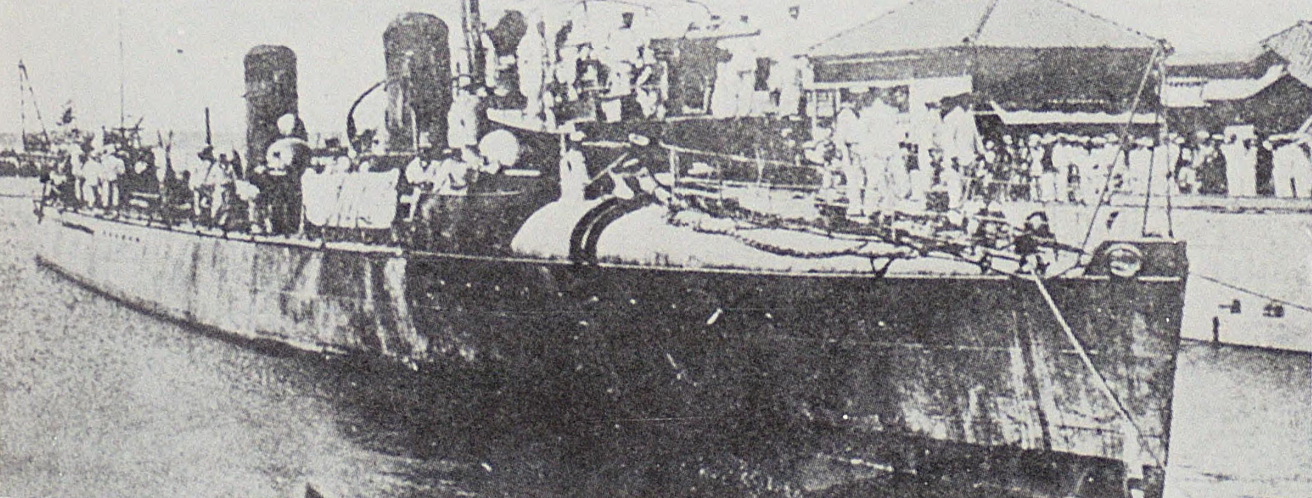

History

Empire of Japan
- Name: Shinonome
- Namesake: 東雲 ("Dawn Cloud")
- Builder: John I. Thornycroft & Company, Chiswick, England
- Yard number: Torpedo Boat Destroyer No. 3
- Laid down: 1 October 1897
- Launched: 14 December 1898
- Completed: 1 February 1899
- Commissioned: 1 February 1899
- Reclassified: From torpedo boat destroyer to destroyer 22 June 1900; Third-class destroyer 28 August 1912
- Identification: GQJW
- Fate: Wrecked 20 July 1913; Sank 23 July 1913
- Stricken: 6 August 1913
- Notes: Wreck sold 29 November 1913

General characteristics
- Type: Murakumo-class destroyer
- Displacement: 275 long tons (279 t) normal; 360.5 long tons (366.3 t) full load
- Length: 208 ft (63 m) waterline, 210 ft (64 m) overall
- Beam: 19 ft 6 in (5.94 m)
- Draught: 6 ft 10 in (2.08 m)
- Depth: 13 ft 6 in (4.11 m)
- Propulsion: Reciprocating engine, 3 boilers, 5,800 ihp (4,300 kW), 2 shafts
- Speed: 30 knots (56 km/h; 35 mph)
- Complement: 50
- Armament: 1 × QF 12-pounder gun; 5 × QF 6 pounder Hotchkiss guns; 2 × 450 mm (18 in) torpedoes

Service record
- Operations: Russo-Japanese War; Battle of Port Arthur; Battle of the Yellow Sea; Battle of Tsushima

Shinonome (東雲, "Dawn Cloud") was one of six Murakumo-class destroyers built for the Imperial Japanese Navy in the late 1890s. Shinonome took part in several major engagements during the Russo-Japanese War (1904–1905) and was wrecked in 1913.

Some sources regard Shinonome as the lead ship of her class and refer to the Murakumo class as the Shinonome class.

== Construction and commissioning ==
Authorized under the 1896 naval program, Shinonome was laid down on 1 October 1897 by John I. Thornycroft & Company at Chiswick, England, as Torpedo Boat Destroyer No. 3. On 16 March 1898, she was named Shinonome. When the Imperial Japanese Navy established its Naval Warship and Torpedo Boat Classification Standards on 21 March 1898, she was classified as a torpedo boat destroyer. Launched on 14 December 1898, she was completed on 1 February 1899 and commissioned the same day.

== Service history ==
Shinonome completed her delivery voyage from England to Japan on 15 April 1899 with her arrival at Yokosuka. On 22 June 1900, the Imperial Japanese Navy established its Naval Vessel Classification Standard, abolishing the classification of "torpedo boat destroyer" and establishing the classification of "destroyer" as a type of warship, and under the new classification scheme Shinonome was classified as a destroyer. Also as of 22 June 1900, she was assigned to the Sasebo Naval District and incorporated into the Standing Fleet.

While cruising in the waters of the Miyako Islands in Okinawa Prefecture on 7 June 1902, Shinonome ran aground in Yabiji, a coral reef group north of Ikema Island. The protected cruisers Akashi and Saien and the destroyer Usugumo came to her assistance. Eventually refloated, she returned to Sasebo on 5 August 1902.

When the Russo-Japanese War broke out in February 1904, Shinonome was part of the 3rd Destroyer Division of the 1st Fleet. During the Battle of Port Arthur on 8 February 1904, she hit the Imperial Russian Navy protected cruiser Pallada with a torpedo.

During the predawn hours of 10 March 1904, a force consisting of Shinonome, Usugumo, the protected cruiser Chitose, and the destroyers Akebono and Sazanami intercepted the Russian destroyers Reshitel‘nyi and Steregushchiy as they approached Port Arthur from the south-southeast during their return from a reconnaissance mission. As the Japanese moved to cut them off from Port Arthur, Reshitel‘nyi and Steregushchiy turned to starboard and made for the shelter of Russian minefields off Dalniy. With superior speed, the Japanese destroyers closed to a range of 300 metres (330 yd), and the two sides opened gunfire on one another. The Russians scored a number of hits on the Japanese ships, but at 06:40 a Japanese shell detonated in one of Steregushchiy′s coal bunkers, damaging two of her boilers and causing her speed to drop off quickly. Reshitel‘nyi′s commanding officer was wounded, forcing her engineering officer to take command, and she also suffered a shell hit which knocked out one of her boilers, but she managed to keep her speed up and reach waters within range of Russian coastal artillery at daybreak. As Reshitel‘nyi again altered course toward Port Arthur, where she arrived safely, the coastal artillery opened fire on the Japanese and discouraged them from continuing the chase.

Giving up their pursuit of Reshitel‘nyi, the Japanese closed with the limping Steregushchiy. The Japanese destroyers were larger and more heavily armed than Steregushchiy, and they opened an overwhelming fire on her in broad daylight. Chitose and the Japanese armored cruiser Tokiwa also joined the action. Aboard Steregushchiy, a Japanese shell exploded in the No. 2 boiler room, opening a hole in the hull through which water entered the compartment, flooded the fireboxes, and forced Steregushchiy′s crew to abandon the room. As the unequal fight continued, Japanese shell hits brought down all of Steregushchiy′s funnels and masts. Her commanding officer and gunnery officer died at their posts, her executive officer was killed while trying to launch her whaleboat, and her engineering officer was blown overboard by the explosion of a Japanese shell. One by one, Steregushchiy′s guns fell silent, and by 07:10 she was a motionless wreck with her hull mangled and almost her entire crew dead or dying. She struck her colors to surrender.

The Japanese ships ceased fire and gathered around the destroyers′ flagship Usugumo, finding that Usugumo and Shinonome had sustained only minor damage, Sazanami had suffered eight shell hits, and Akebono had taken about 30 hits. The Japanese destroyers had suffered a number of killed and wounded. The Japanese attempted to take possession of the Russian destroyer, but Steregushchiy′s crew had opened her Kingston valves to scuttle her, and two members of her crew locked themselves in her engine room to prevent the Japanese from closing the valves, sacrificing their lives to ensure that she sank. At 08:10, a Japanese tug arrived, and Sazanami began an attempt to tow Steregushchiy to port. At around the same time, however, the Russian armored cruiser Bayan and protected cruiser Novik approached under the personal command of the commander of the Russian First Pacific Squadron, Vice Admiral Stepan Osipovich Makarov, and the Japanese abandoned their towing attempt, rescued Steregushchiy′s four surviving crew members, and withdrew to avoid combat. At 09:07, Steregushchiy sank 7 nautical miles (13 km; 8.1 mi) southeast of Mount Laoteshan and 6 nautical miles (11 km; 6.9 mi) from the Lushun Lighthouse with the loss of 49 members of her crew.

Shinonome later participated in the Battle of the Yellow Sea in August 1904 and the Battle of Tsushima in May 1905, among other actions. During the Battle of Tsushima, she served as flagship of the 3rd Destroyer Division. After the war ended in early September 1905, she participated in a triumphant naval review held off Yokohama, Japan, on 23 October 1905 and was placed in the fourth row.

On 28 August 1912, the Imperial Japanese Navy revised its ship classification standards. It established three categories of destroyers, with those of 1,000 displacement tons or more defined as first-class destroyers, those of 600 to 999 displacement tons as second-class destroyers, and those of 599 or fewer displacement tons as third-class destroyers. Under this classification scheme, Shinonome became a third-class destroyer.

During a voyage from Tamsui, Formosa, to Makeng in the Pescadores Islands, Shinonome encountered high winds and was wrecked on 20 July 1913 off the coast of Formosa northwest of Anping. Her hull broke up and she sank on 23 July 1913. She was stricken from the naval register on 6 August 1913, and her wreck was sold for scrap on 29 November 1913.

== Commanding officers ==
- Lieutenant Commander Ken Isobe 22 June 1900 – 4 September 1902
- Lieutenant Mencius Yoshida 11 December 1903 – 14 June 1905
- Lieutenant Yoshihiro Morimoto 14 June 1905 – 12 December 1905
- Lieutenant Commander Yoshihiro Morimoto, 12 December 1905 – 25 January 1906
- Lieutenant Commander Shunzo Mori 25 January 1906 – 1 April 1906
- Lieutenant Gokichi Shibauchi 1 April 1906 – 28 September 1907
- Lieutenant Kaori Samejima 28 September 1907 – 1 February 1908
- Lieutenant Shinzaburo Ito 1 February 1908 – 16 May 1908
- Lieutenant Tameyoshi Noda 16 May 1908 – 23 December 1908
- Lieutenant Shigenosuke Sakai 23 December 1908 – 1 February 1909
- Lieutenant Masajiro Okada 1 February 1909 – 1 December 1909
- Lieutenant Kumazo Nakamura 1 December 1909 – 1 April 1911
- Lieutenant Captain Matsudaira 1 April 1911 – 17 April 1911
- Lieutenant Torao Yamada 17 April 1911 – 13 July 1912
- Lieutenant Yoichi Nomura 13 July 1912 – 8 January 1913
- Lieutenant Yutaka Shiraki 8 January 1913 – unknown
