= Japanese destroyer Usugumo (1900) =

Murakumo-class destroyer

History

Empire of Japan
- Name: Usugumo
- Namesake: 薄雲 ("Thin Clouds")
- Ordered: 1897
- Builder: John I. Thornycroft & Company, Chiswick, England
- Yard number: Torpedo Boat Destroyer No. 10
- Laid down: 1 September 1898
- Launched: 16 January 1900
- Completed: 1 February 1900
- Commissioned: 1 February 1900
- Reclassified: From torpedo boat destroyer to destroyer 22 June 1900; Third-class destroyer 28 August 1912; Special service vessel (second-class minesweeper) 1 April 1922; Second-class minesweeper 30 June 1923
- Stricken: 1 August 1923
- Renamed: No. 2525 1 August 1923
- Reclassified: General utility vessel (cargo ship) 1 August 1923
- Fate: Hulked 25 February 1925; Sunk as target 29 April 1925

General characteristics
- Type: Murakumo-class destroyer
- Displacement: 275 long tons (279 t) normal; 360.5 long tons (366.3 t) full load
- Length: 208 ft (63 m) waterline, 210 ft (64 m) overall
- Beam: 19 ft 6 in (5.94 m)
- Draught: 6 ft 10 in (2.08 m)
- Depth: 13 ft 6 in (4.11 m)
- Propulsion: Reciprocating engine, 3 boilers, 5,800 ihp (4,300 kW), 2 shafts
- Speed: 30 knots (56 km/h; 35 mph)
- Complement: 50
- Armament: 1 × QF 12-pounder gun; 5 × QF 6 pounder Hotchkiss guns; 2 × 450 mm (18 in) torpedoes

Service record
- Operations: Russo-Japanese War; Battle of Port Arthur; Battle of the Yellow Sea; Battle of Tsushima; World War I; Siege of Tsingtao

Usugumo (薄雲, "Thin Clouds") was one of six Murakumo-class destroyers built for the Imperial Japanese Navy in the late 1890s and the only one not completed until 1900. Usugumo took part in several major engagements during the Russo-Japanese War (1904–1905) and served during World War I (1914–1918).

== Construction and commissioning ==
Authorized under the 1897 naval program, Usugumo was laid down on 1 September 1898 by John I. Thornycroft & Company at Chiswick, England, as Torpedo Boat Destroyer No. 10. Launched on 16 January 1900, she was completed on 1 February 1900 and commissioned the same day, classified as a torpedo boat destroyer.

== Service history ==
Usugumo completed her delivery voyage from England to Japan on 14 May 1900 with her arrival at Kagoshima. She was reclassified as a destroyer on 22 June 1900.

After the destroyer Shinonome ran aground in Yabiji, a coral reef group north of Ikema Island in the Miyako Islands in Okinawa Prefecture, on 7 June 1902, Usugumo and the protected cruisers Akashi and Saien came to her assistance. Shinonome eventually was refloated and made port at Sasebo, Japan, on 5 August 1902.

When the Russo-Japanese War broke out in February 1904, Usugumo was part of the 3rd Destroyer Division of the 1st Fleet. She took part in the Battle of Port Arthur on 8 February 1904.

During the predawn hours of 10 March 1904, a force consisting of Usugumo, Shinonome, the protected cruiser Chitose, and the destroyers Akebono and Sazanami — with Usugumo serving as the destroyer division's flagship — intercepted the Russian destroyers Reshitel‘nyi and Steregushchiy as they approached Port Arthur from the south-southeast during their return from a reconnaissance mission. As the Japanese moved to cut them off from Port Arthur, Reshitel‘nyi and Steregushchiy turned to starboard and made for the shelter of Russian minefields off Dalniy. With superior speed, the Japanese destroyers closed to a range of 300 metres (330 yd), and the two sides opened gunfire on one another. The Russians scored a number of hits on the Japanese ships, but at 06:40 a Japanese shell detonated in one of Steregushchiy′s coal bunkers, damaging two of her boilers and causing her speed to drop off quickly. Reshitel‘nyi′s commanding officer was wounded, forcing her engineering officer to take command, and she also suffered a shell hit which knocked out one of her boilers, but she managed to keep her speed up and reach waters within range of Russian coastal artillery at daybreak. As Reshitel‘nyi again altered course toward Port Arthur, where she arrived safely, the coastal artillery opened fire on the Japanese and discouraged them from continuing the chase.

Giving up their pursuit of Reshitel‘nyi, the Japanese closed with the limping Steregushchiy. The Japanese destroyers were larger and more heavily armed than Steregushchiy, and they opened an overwhelming fire on her in broad daylight. Chitose and the Japanese armored cruiser Tokiwa also joined the action. Aboard Steregushchiy, a Japanese shell exploded in the No. 2 boiler room, opening a hole in the hull through which water entered the compartment, flooded the fireboxes, and forced Steregushchiy′s crew to abandon the room. As the unequal fight continued, Japanese shell hits brought down all of Steregushchiy′s funnels and masts. Her commanding officer and gunnery officer died at their posts, her executive officer was killed while trying to launch her whaleboat, and her engineering officer was blown overboard by the explosion of a Japanese shell. One by one, Steregushchiy′s guns fell silent, and by 07:10 she was a motionless wreck with her hull mangled and almost her entire crew dead or dying. She struck her colors to surrender.

The Japanese ships ceased fire and gathered around Usugumo, finding that Usugumo and Shinonome had sustained only minor damage, Sazanami had suffered eight shell hits, and Akebono had taken about 30 hits. The Japanese destroyers had suffered a number of killed and wounded. The Japanese attempted to take possession of the Russian destroyer, but Steregushchiy′s crew had opened her Kingston valves to scuttle her, and two members of her crew locked themselves in her engine room to prevent the Japanese from closing the valves, sacrificing their lives to ensure that she sank. At 08:10, a Japanese tug arrived, and Sazanami began an attempt to tow Steregushchiy to port. At around the same time, however, the Russian armored cruiser Bayan and protected cruiser Novik approached under the personal command of the commander of the Russian First Pacific Squadron, Vice Admiral Stepan Osipovich Makarov, and the Japanese abandoned their towing attempt, rescued Steregushchiy′s four surviving crew members, and withdrew to avoid combat. At 09:07, Steregushchiy sank 7 nautical miles (13 km; 8.1 mi) southeast of Mount Laoteshan and 6 nautical miles (11 km; 6.9 mi) from the Lushun Lighthouse with the loss of 49 members of her crew.

Usugumo later took part in the Battle of the Yellow Sea on 10 August 1904 and the Battle of Tsushima in late May 1905. During the Battle of Tsushima, Usugumo was part of the force escorting surrendered Imperial Russian Navy warships to Japan during the night of 28–29 May 1905 when the captured Russian battleship Oryol, which was under the control of a Japanese prize crew with her Russian crew still aboard as prisoners-of-war, began to slow and finally stopped altogether due to mechanical defects. The rest of the force proceeded with its voyage, leaving Oryol behind with only Usugumo standing by. The ugly mood of the Russian prisoners aboard Oryol prevented her Japanese commander from ordering Usugumo to go for help, as he believed he might need Usugumo′s crew to maintain order aboard Oryol, but around dawn on 29 May the Russians became more cooperative, and the Japanese commander sent Usugumo to request the assistance of a tug. Usugumo soon encountered the Japanese armored cruiser Asama, which proceeded to assist Oryol. By the time Asama rendezvoused with Oryol, Oryol was back underway, and a few minutes later the main Japanese force also arrived, having turned back to find Oryol after discovering that she was missing. Oryol reached Japan, where she was repaired and incorporated into the Imperial Japanese Navy with the name Iwami.

On 28 August 1912, the Imperial Japanese Navy revised its ship classification standards. It established three categories of destroyers, with those of 1,000 displacement tons or more defined as first-class destroyers, those of 600 to 999 displacement tons as second-class destroyers, and those of 599 or fewer displacement tons as third-class destroyers. Under this classification scheme, Usugumo became a third-class destroyer.

After Japan entered World War I in August 1914, Usugumo operated off Tsingtao, China, in support of the Siege of Tsingtao. Later that year, she took part in the Japanese seizure of the German Empire′s colonial possessions in the Caroline, Mariana, and Marshall Islands.

On 1 April 1922, Usugumo was reclassified as a "special service vessel" for use as a second-class minesweeper. On 30 June 1923 she was reclassified as a second-class minesweeper. On 1 August 1923, she stricken from the navy list, reclassified as a "general utility vessel" for use as a cargo ship, and simultaneously renamed No. 2525. She was hulked on 25 February 1925. On 29 April 1925 she was sunk as a live-fire target in the Philippine Sea off Izu Ōshima in the Izu Islands.

== Commanding officers ==
- Lieutenant Commander Shuzo Matsuoka February 14, 1899 – unknown (pre-commissioning)
- Lieutenant Taijiro Nagata 22 June 1900 – 25 September 1900
- Lieutenant Commander Yoshiomi Mori 25 September 1900 – 10 April 1901
- Lieutenant Commander Mitsuki Kaneko 17 April 1901 – 25 May 1903
- Lieutenant Commander Takanosuke Oyama 25 May 1903 – 11 September 1904
- Lieutenant Commander Shunzo Mori 12 December 1905 – 10 May 1906
- Commander Nao Kasama 10 May 1906 – 3 October 1906
- Lieutenant Gokichi Shibauchi 3 October 1906 – 12 January 1907
- Lieutenant Kiichi Yamaguchi 12 January 1907 – 20 April 1908
- Lieutenant Shinzaburo Ito 20 April 1908 – 16 May 1908
- Lieutenant Tameyoshi Noda 16 May 1908 – 25 September 1908
- Lieutenant Abe Sanpei 25 September 1908 – 10 December 1908
- Lieutenant Yoshizo Matsushita 10 December 1908 – 1 February 1909
- Lieutenant Masafuyu Ogawa 1 February 1909 – 26 September 1910
- Lieutenant Matsudaira 26 September 1910 – 1 March 1912
- Lieutenant Inao Takayanagi 1 March 1912 – 1 December 1912
- Lieutenant Minoru Shimura 1 December 1912 – 10 July 1913
- Lieutenant Commander Nobuo Hamura 10 July 1913 – 14 October 1913
- Lieutenant Commander Toyo Horie 14 October 1913 – unknown
- Lieutenant Yagoro Morita unknown – 13 December 1915
- Lieutenant Toshiro Tajiri 13 December 1915 – 1 December 1916
- Lieutenant Taichi Miki 1 December 1916 – 1 December 1917
- Lieutenant Kyozo Murashima 1 December 1917 – 1 December 1919
- Lieutenant Akira Okuno 1 December 1919 – 21 August 1920
- Lieutenant Commander Junichi Yamanaka 23 August 1920 – 10 November 1921
- Lieutenant Tadashi Hiraoka 10 November 1921 – 1 February 1922
- Lieutenant Shinya Oshima 1 February 1922 – unknown
