= Russian destroyer Steregushchiy =

Russian destroyer Steregushchiy or Soviet destroyer Steregushchy may refer to various ships of the Imperial Russian Navy or Soviet Navy.

- Russian destroyer Steregushchiy (1903), an Imperial Russian Navy Sokol-class destroyer launched in 1903 and sunk in 1904 during the Russo-Japanese War.
- Russian destroyer Steregushchiy (1905), an Imperial Russian Navy Ukraina-class destroyer launched in 1905 which later served in the Soviet Navy and was scrapped in 1924.
- Soviet destroyer Steregushchy (1938), a Soviet Navy Gnevny-class destroyer completed in 1939 and scrapped in 1959.
- Soviet destroyer Steregushchy (1966), a Soviet Navy Kashin-class destroyer in commission from 1966 to 1993.

== See also ==
- Russian corvette Steregushchiy
- Steregushchiy-class corvette
