= Providence Reef =

Providence Reef may refer to:

- Providence Reef in Fiji
- Yabiji, formerly known as Providence Reef, a coral reef group in Japan's Miyako Islands

== See also ==
- Providence Atoll
