= Japanese destroyer Usugumo =

Two destroyers of the Imperial Japanese Navy have been named Usugumo (薄雲, "thin clouds"):

- Japanese destroyer Usugumo (1900), a Murakumo-class destroyer of the Imperial Japanese Navy during the Russo-Japanese War
- Japanese destroyer Usugumo (1927), a Fubuki-class destroyer of the Imperial Japanese Navy during World War II
