= Shinonome =

Shinonome may refer to:

== Places ==
- Shinonome, Tokyo (東雲), an area in Koto Ward, Tokyo

== Transport and vehicles ==
=== Rail ===
- Shinonome Station (disambiguation), 東雲駅 Shinonome-eki, several Japanese train stations
  - Shinonome Station (Kyoto) (東雲駅 Shinonome-eki), a train station in Kyoto, Japan
  - Shinonome Station (Tokyo) (東雲駅 Shinonome-eki), a train station in Tokyo, Japan

=== Naval ===
- Japanese destroyer Shinonome
  - Japanese destroyer Shinonome (1898) (東雲), a Murakumo-class destroyer of the Imperial Japanese Navy during the Russo-Japanese War
  - Shinonome-class destroyer (東雲型駆逐艦 Shinonomegata kuchikukan), an alternate name for the Murakumo destroyer class
  - Japanese destroyer Shinonome (1927) (東雲), a Fubuki-class destroyer built for the Imperial Japanese Navy following World War I.

== People with the surname ==
- Mizuo Shinonome (東雲 水生), a Japanese manga artist

=== Fictional ===
- Hitomi Shinonome, a character in Loveless
- Various members of the Shinonome family, characters in Eiken
- Satsuki Shinonome and Hazuki Shinonome, characters in Love, Elections & Chocolate
- Kon Shinonome, a character in Amatsuki
- Nano Shinonome, Professor Shinonome and Principal Shinonome, characters in Nichijou
- Shinonome, dragon sister to the Eliatrope Qilby, characters in Wakfu
- Ena Shinonome, a character in Hatsune Miku: Colorful Stage!
- Akito Shinonome, a character in Hatsune Miku: Colorful Stage!

== Other ==
- Shinonome, a raster font family from which Mona Font is derived
