= Japanese destroyer Sazanami (1899) =

Japanese destroyer

Coordinates: 35.007°N 139.836°E

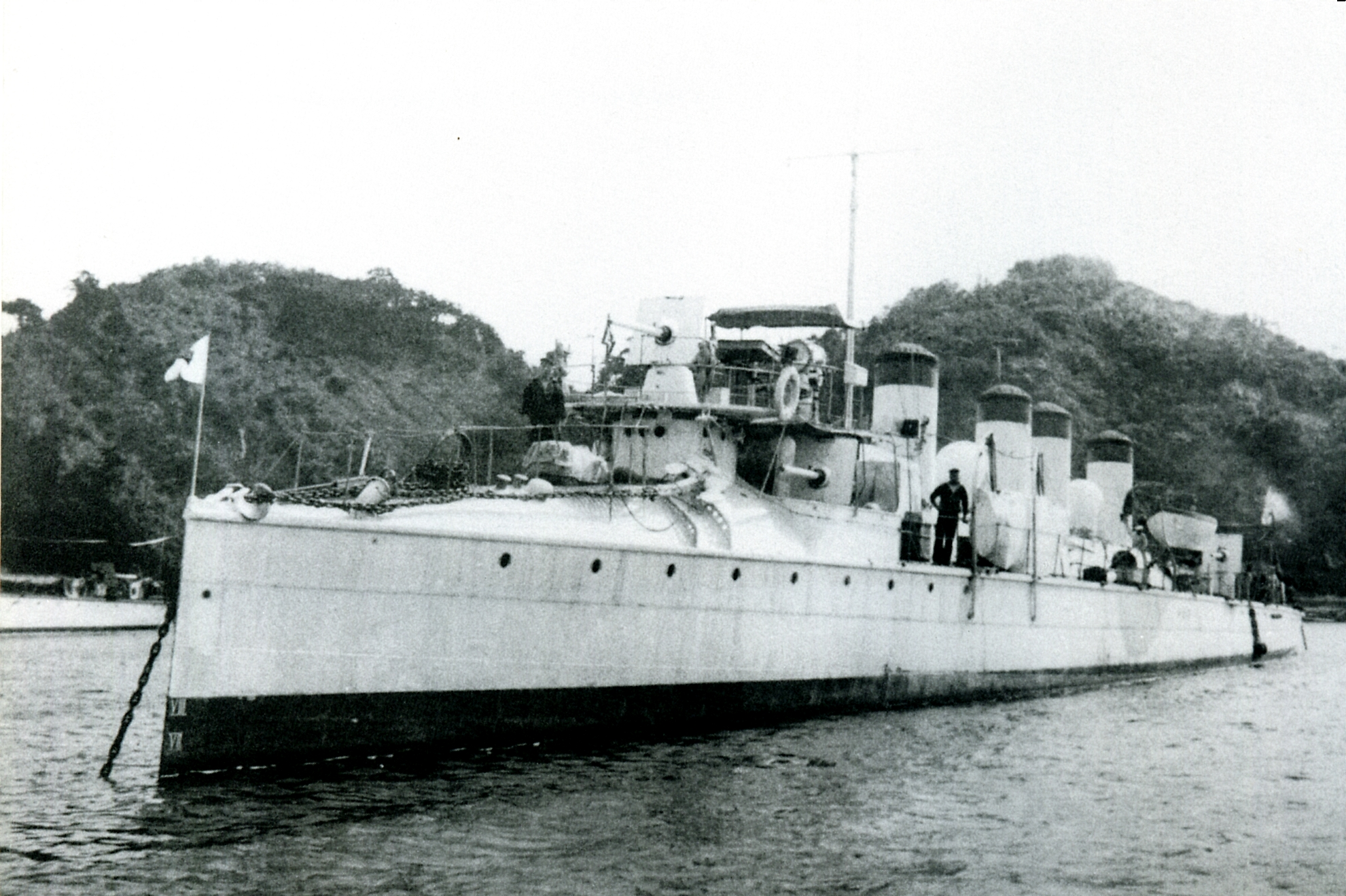
- Sazanami at Yokosuka, 1900

History

Empire of Japan
- Name: Sazanami
- Builder: Yarrow & Company
- Laid down: 1 June 1897
- Launched: 8 July 1899
- Completed: 28 August 1899
- Decommissioned: 1 April 1913
- Renamed: Sazanami Maru 23 August 1914
- Reclassified: Miscellaneous service vessel 23 August 1914
- Fate: Sunk as target 29 August 1916; Wreck sold for scrap 9 January 1917

General characteristics
- Class & type: Ikazuchi-class destroyer
- Displacement: 305 long tons (310 t) normal, 410 long tons (420 t) full load
- Length: 67.2 m (220 ft) pp, 68.4 m (224 ft) overall
- Beam: 6.2 m (20 ft)
- Draught: 1.57 m (5.2 ft)
- Propulsion: 2-shaft reciprocating, 4 Yarrow boilers, 6,000 ihp (4,500 kW)
- Speed: 30 knots (56 km/h)
- Complement: 55
- Armament: 1 × QF 12 pounder gun; 5 × QF 6 pounder Hotchkiss gun; 2 × 18 in (460 mm) torpedoes

Sazanami (漣, "Ripples") was an Ikazuchi-class destroyer of the Imperial Japanese Navy. She was one of the earliest and smallest Japanese destroyers. Only 220 feet (67 m) long, she could make 30 to 32 knots (56 to 59 km/h; 35 to 37 mph) on 6,000 horsepower (4,474 kW).

== Service history ==
Completed on 28 August 1899, Sazanami arrived at Sasebo on 24 March 1900, where she was classified as a destroyer.

During the Russo-Japanese War (1904–1905), Sazanami participated in the Battle of Port Arthur on 8–9 February 1904. During the predawn hours of 10 March 1904, a force consisting of Sazanami, the protected cruiser Chitose, and the destroyers Akebono, Shinonome, and Usugumo intercepted the Russian destroyers Reshitel‘nyi and Steregushchiy as they approached Port Arthur from the south-southeast during their return from a reconnaissance mission. As the Japanese moved to cut them off from Port Arthur, Reshitel‘nyi and Steregushchiy turned to starboard and made for the shelter of Russian minefields off Dalniy. With superior speed, the Japanese destroyers closed to a range of 300 metres (330 yd), and the two sides opened gunfire on one another. The Russians scored a number of hits on the Japanese ships, but at 06:40 a Japanese shell detonated in one of Steregushchiy′s coal bunkers, damaging two of her boilers and causing her speed to drop off quickly. Reshitel‘nyi′s commanding officer was wounded, forcing her engineering officer to take command, and she also suffered a shell hit which knocked out one of her boilers, but she managed to keep her speed up and reach waters within range of Russian coastal artillery at daybreak. As Reshitel‘nyi again altered course toward Port Arthur, where she arrived safely, the coastal artillery opened fire on the Japanese and discouraged them from continuing the chase.

Giving up their pursuit of Reshitel‘nyi, the Japanese closed with the limping Steregushchiy. The Japanese destroyers were larger and more heavily armed than Steregushchiy, and they opened an overwhelming fire on her in broad daylight. Chitose and the Japanese armored cruiser Tokiwa also joined the action. Aboard Steregushchiy, a Japanese shell exploded in the No. 2 boiler room, opening a hole in the hull through which water entered the compartment, flooded the fireboxes, and forced Steregushchiy′s crew to abandon the room. As the unequal fight continued, Japanese shell hits brought down all of Steregushchiy′s funnels and masts. Her commanding officer and gunnery officer died at their posts, her executive officer was killed while trying to launch her whaleboat, and her engineering officer was blown overboard by the explosion of a Japanese shell. One by one, Steregushchiy′s guns fell silent, and by 07:10 she was a motionless wreck with her hull mangled and almost her entire crew dead or dying. She struck her colors to surrender.

The Japanese ships ceased fire and gathered around the destroyers′ flagship Usugumo, finding that Usugumo and Shinonome had sustained only minor damage, Sazanami had suffered eight shell hits, and Akebono had taken about 30 hits, and that the Japanense destroyers had suffered a number of killed and wounded. The Japanese attempted to take possession of the Russian destroyer, but Steregushchiy′s crew had opened her Kingston valves to scuttle her, and two members of her crew locked themselves in her engine room to prevent the Japanese from closing the valves, sacrificing their lives to ensure that she sank. At 08:10, a Japanese tug arrived, and Sazanami began an attempt to tow Steregushchiy to port. At around the same time, however, the Russian armored cruiser Bayan and protected cruiser Novik approached under the personal command of the commander of the Russian First Pacific Squadron, Vice Admiral Stepan Osipovich Makarov, and the Japanese abandoned their towing attempt, rescued Steregushchiy′s four surviving crew members, and withdrew to avoid combat. At 09:07, Steregushchiy sank 7 nautical miles (13 km; 8.1 mi) southeast of Mount Laoteshan and 6 nautical miles (11 km; 6.9 mi) from the Lushun Lighthouse with the loss of 49 members of her crew.

Sazanmi later took part in the Battle of the Yalu River (30 April–1 May 1904). At the Battle of Tsushima (27–28 May 1905), the Imperial Russian Navy destroyer Bedovii, which was carrying the wounded commander of the Russian Second Pacific Squadron, Vice Admiral Zinovy Rozhestvensky, surrendered to her.

On 1 April 1913, Sazanami was decommissioned. On 23 August 1914, she was reclassified as a miscellaneous service ship, designated as a target ship, and renamed Sazanami Maru. On 29 August 1916, she was sunk as a target off Tateyama, Japan. Her wreck was sold for scrap on 9 January 1917.
