= Russian destroyer Steregushchiy (1905) =

Ukraina-class destroyer

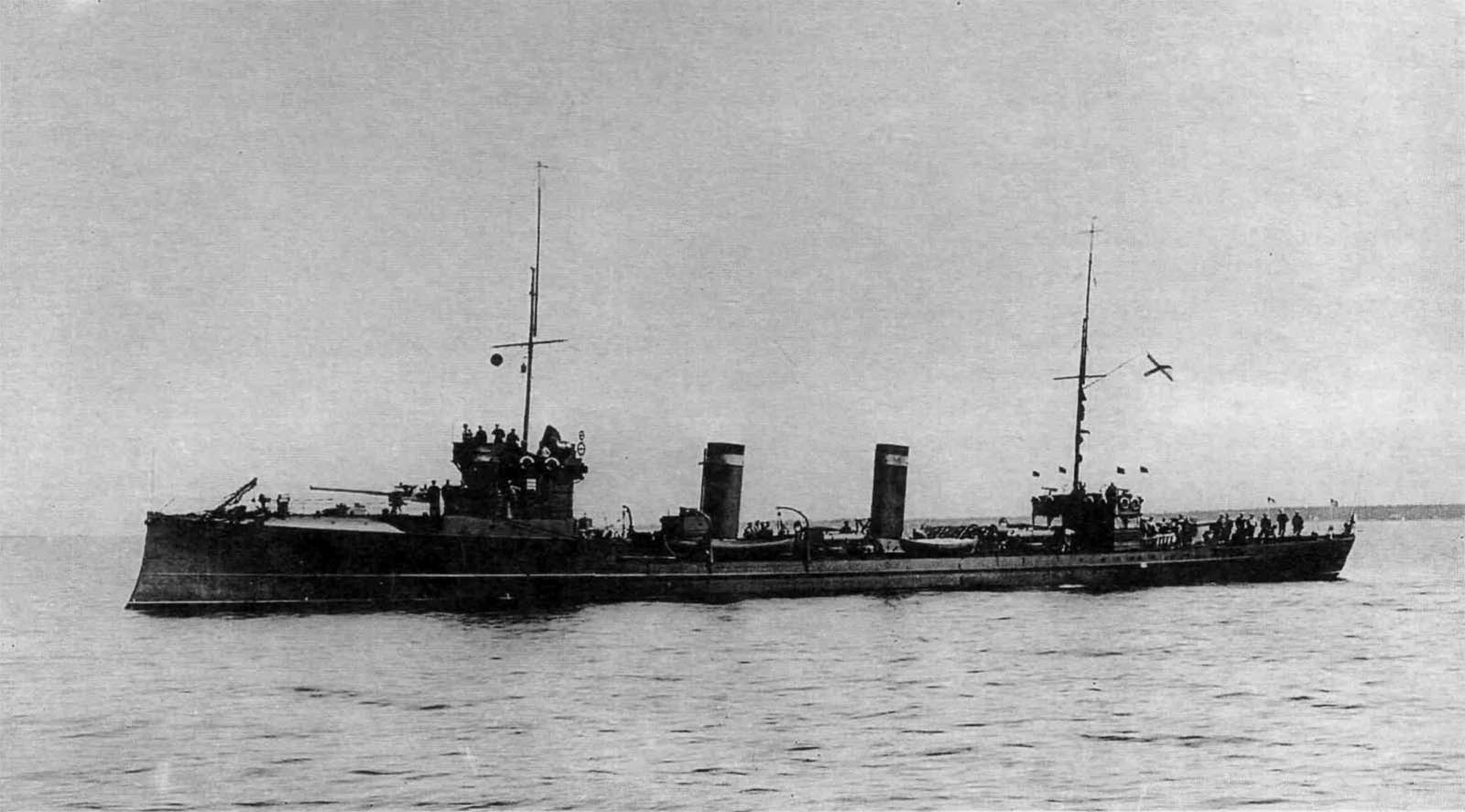

History

Russian Empire
- Name: Steregushchiy
- Namesake: The Russian destroyer Steregushchiy (English "Guardian") of 1903
- Builder: Lange & Sohn, Riga, Russia
- Laid down: 20 August [O.S. 7 August] 1904
- Launched: 4 July [O.S. 21 June] 1904
- Commissioned: 17 May [O.S. 4 May] 1906
- Reclassified: From "mine cruiser" to destroyer 10 October [O.S. 27 September] 1907
- Fate: To Russian Republic March [O.S. February] 1917

Russian Republic
- Acquired: March [O.S. February] 1917
- Fate: To Russian Soviet Federated Socialist Republic 7 November [O.S. 25 October] 1917

Russian Soviet Federated Socialist Republic
- Acquired: 7 November [O.S. 25 October] 1917
- Fate: Scrapped 1922 or 1924 (see text)
- Stricken: 21 November 1925

General characteristics
- Class & type: Ukraina-class destroyer
- Displacement: 500 long tons (510 t) (standard); 630 long tons (640 t) (full load)
- Length: 63.2 m (207 ft 4 in)
- Beam: 7.24 m (23 ft 9 in)
- Height: 3.35 m (11 ft 0 in)
- Draught: 2.3 m (7 ft 7 in)
- Propulsion: 2 x vertical triple expansion steam engines, 4 x Normand boilers, 6,325 hp (4,717 kW)
- Speed: 25.9 knots (48.0 km/h; 29.8 mph)
- Range: 1,105 nautical miles (2,046 km; 1,272 mi)
- Complement: 90
- Armament: As built: 1 × 75 mm 50 caliber Pattern 1892 guns; 4 × 57 mm guns; 4 × Maxim machine guns; 3 x 456 mm (18 in) torpedo tubes; 16 x mines; From 1910: 2 x 102 mm 60 caliber Pattern 1911 guns; 1 x 37 mm gun; 2 x 456 mm (18 in) torpedo tubes; 16 x mines; From 1916: 2 x 102 mm 60 caliber Pattern 1911 guns; 1 x 40 mm antiaircraft gun; 2 x machine guns; 2 x 456 mm (18 in) torpedo tubes; 16 x mines

Service record
- Operations: World War I; Battle of the Gulf of Riga; Battle of Moon Sound; Russian Civil War; Ice Cruise of the Baltic Fleet

Steregushchiy (Стерегущий, English "Guardian") was a Ukraina-class destroyer built for the Imperial Russian Navy in the early 20th century. She served in the Baltic Sea, seeing action in World War I between 1914 and 1917 in the Imperial Russian Navy and its successor, the navy of the Russian Republic. She then joined the naval forces of what would become the Russian Soviet Federated Socialist Republic — forces which later became the Soviet Navy upon the foundation of the Soviet Union — and served in them during the Russian Civil War (1917–1921).

Steregushchiy was named for the previous Russian destroyer Steregushchiy, which was sunk in 1904 in a heroic action in the Yellow Sea during the Russo-Japanese War.

== Construction and commissioning ==
Steregushchiy was laid down on 20 August [O.S. 7 August] 1904 in Riga, Latvia — then a part of the Russian Empire – at the shipyard of Lange i syn (Ланге и сын, English "Lange & Sohn"), and her name was entered on the rolls of the Baltic Fleet on 3 April [O.S. 21 March] 1905. She was launched on 4 July [O.S. 21 June] 1905. She completed her official acceptance trials on 17 May [O.S. 4 May] 1906 and was commissioned that day.

== Service history ==
From 1905 to 1908, Steregushchiy operated as part of a detachment that practiced the defense of the Russian Empire's Baltic Sea coast. She was classified as a "mine cruiser" until 10 October [O.S. 27 September] 1907, when she was reclassified as a destroyer. In 1909, she was assigned to the 1st Mine Division, and she underwent an overhaul at the shipyard of the joint-stock company Creighton & Company in 1909–1910 in which her gun and torpedo tube armament was modified, the hot-water pipes in her boilers were replaced, her mainmast was moved to her after bridge, and the bulky ventilation cowls leading to her boiler rooms were replaced with mushroom-shaped ones.

The Russian Empire entered World War I in August 1914, and during the war Steregushchiy served in the 6th Division of the Mine Division. She took part in raids against German communications and patrols in the Baltic Sea, the defense of the coast of Courland and the Gulf of Riga, minelaying operations in the southeastern and central parts of the Baltic Sea, and escorting and carrying out the anti-submarine defense of the main forces of the Baltic Fleet. From 8 to 21 August [O.S. 26 July to 8 August] 1915 she participated in the Battle of the Gulf of Riga. In 1916, she underwent modernization at the Creighton & Company shipyard, in which her gun armament again was altered, and her boiler tubes were replaced.

Steregushchiy took part in the February Revolution of 8 to 16 March [O.S. 23 February to 3 March] 1917, in which Emperor Nicholas II was overthrown and the Russian Provisional Government took control of the country and established the Russian Republic. Her World war I service continued, and from 12 to 19 October [O.S. 29 September to 6 October] 1917 she participated in the operations related to the Battle of Moon Sound.

On 7 November [O.S. 25 October] 1917 the Russian Provisional Government was overthrown in the October Revolution, beginning the Russian Civil War. That day, Steregushchiy joined the Red Baltic Fleet in the armed forces of what in 1918 would become the new Russian Soviet Federative Socialist Republic (RSFSR) and would eventually become part of the Soviet Navy after the establishment of the Soviet Union.

On 3 March 1918, the RSFSR signed the Treaty of Brest-Litovsk with the Central Powers and Russia exited World War I. That day, Steregushchiy was at Helsingfors. She took part in the Ice Cruise of the Baltic Fleet, moving to Kronshtadt by April 1918. She was laid up at Kronshtadt.

Again assigned to the Baltic Fleet on 21 April 1921, Steregushchiy later moved to the Baltic Shipyard in Petrograd. She was scrapped in 1922 or 1924, according to different sources. She was stricken from the naval register on 21 November 1925.
