= Japanese destroyer Shinonome =

Two destroyers of the Imperial Japanese Navy have been named Shinonome (東雲, ”dawn” or "daybreak"):

- Japanese destroyer Shinonome (1898), lead ship of her class of the Imperial Japanese Navy during the Russo-Japanese War
- Japanese destroyer Shinonome (1927), a Fubuki-class destroyer of the Imperial Japanese Navy during World War II

== See also ==
- Shinonome (disambiguation)
- Shinonome-class destroyer, also called Murakumo-class destroyer, a class of destroyer of the Imperial Japanese Navy
