= Shinonome Station =

Shinonome Station (東雲駅 Shinonome-eki) is the name of two train stations in Japan:

- Shinonome Station (Kyoto)
- Shinonome Station (Tokyo)

== See also ==
- Shinonome (disambiguation)
- Tōun Station
