= Ikema Wetland =

Wetland in Ikema Island, Japan

Coordinates: 24°55′55″N 125°14′35″E

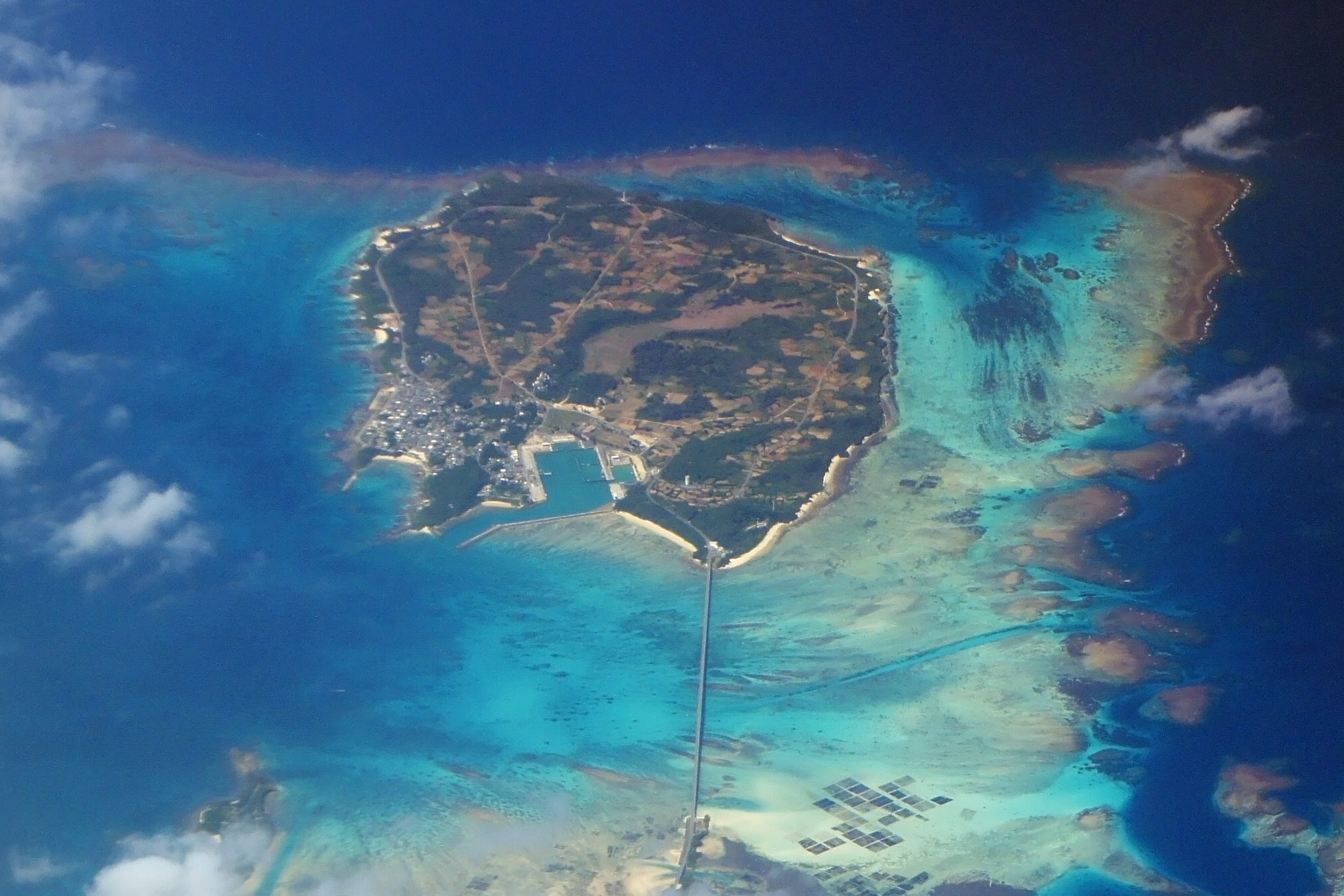
Ikema in the Miyako Islands, connected with Miyakojima to the south by bridge

The Ikema Wetland (池間湿原, Ikema-shitsugen) are wetlands in the center of Ikema Island, Miyakojima, Okinawa, Japan. It is also called Yunimui or Īnubū in the local dialect. The wetland area extends for 38 hectares (94 acres) and is the largest in Okinawa Prefecture. The "Wetlands and Coral Reefs of Ikema-jima" have been selected by the Ministry of the Environment as one of the "500 Important Wetlands in Japan" (日本の重要湿地500) and the entire island, totaling 282 hectares (700 acres). It was designated a Wildlife Protection Area on November 1, 2011.

== History ==
The island of Ikema-jima was formerly divided into an eastern and a western island, with a water lane between. The king of the four islands built a bridge between the two. Eventually, the two islands were connected. The northern water lane was called Īnubū with an opening in the south which was about 60 hectares (150 acres). For the purposes of land reclamation, the water lane was interrupted between 1924 and 1934. Two area of land became reclaimed, one of 47 hectares (120 acres), the other of 20 hectares (49 acres). The wetland area outside the dike, combining both freshwater and seawater, was called Yunimui ("sand elevated area"). Between 1963 and 1982, Ikema Fishing Port was built and the wetland area was completely separated from the sea.

== Observation Platform ==
A wooden observation platform was replaced in 2009 with a steel platform. A road and parking lots were constructed.

A problem in the 21st century is that the wetland is shrinking with the growth of weeds.

== Biota ==
=== Fauna ===
==== Birds ====
The wetland is visited by Eurasian wigeon, mallard, eastern spot-billed duck, northern shoveler, garganey, Eurasian coot, アササギ (asasagi), and Eurasian bittern. Purple heron and bean goose are rare visitors.

==== Fish and crustacean ====
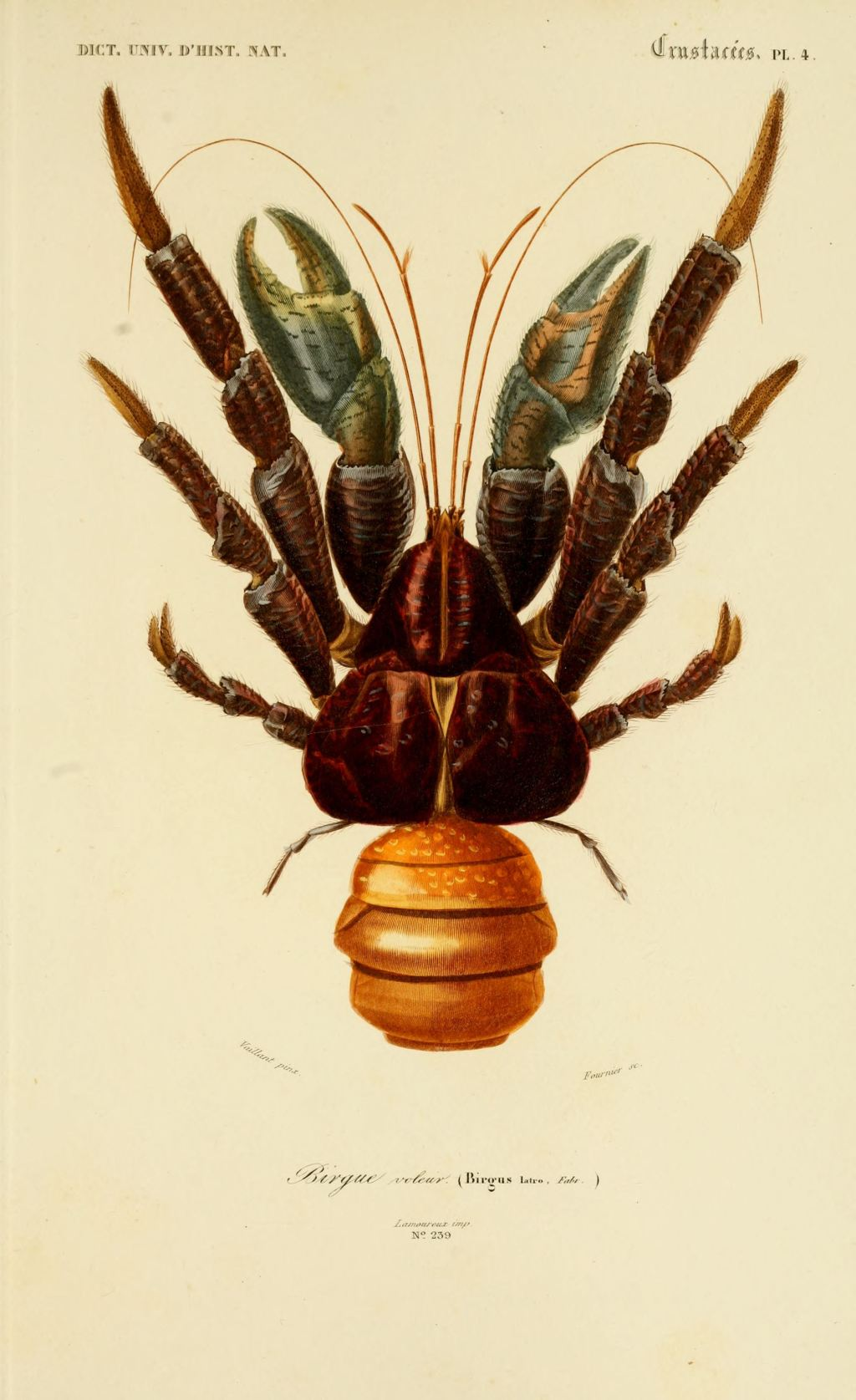
Print of a coconut crab from the Dictionnaire d'Histoire Naturelle of 1849

Tilapia and guppy of foreign origin are found. Discoplax or Okagani (オカガニ, Okagani) cross the road for reproduction every June. Coconut crabs are also found.

==== Insects ====
Ceriagrion latericium ryukyuuanum, Cercion sexlineatum, Ictingomphus pertinax, Brachydiplax chalybea flavovittat, Tholymis tillarga are found. Other insects include Gerridae and Hydrophilidae.

=== Flora ===
In 1983 the previous wetland was found to have become partly grassland with Panicum repens L. and Miscanthus sinensis. In the wetland were Panicum paludosum Roxb., Cyperus tenuispica Streud, Cyperus pilosus Vahl, Cyperus difformis, Eleocharis geniculata, Fimbristylis miliacea and Aeschynomene indica. As a reminder of the Bay vegetation was Exoecaria agallocha L. as of 1978. At the frontline of water surface was Typha domingensis, toward the shore were Scirpus tabemaemontanic Gmelin, Paspalum vaginatum Schwarz and Cladium chinense Nees; they were seen in line. At the periphery of the Ikema Island were trees of Pandanus tectorius, while in the eastern muddy area was Clerodendrum inerme.

== See also ==
- Ramsar Sites in Japan
