= Zinovy Rozhestvensky =

Russian admiral (1848–1909)

Vice Admiral Zinovy Rozhestvensky
- Зиновий Петрович Рожественский
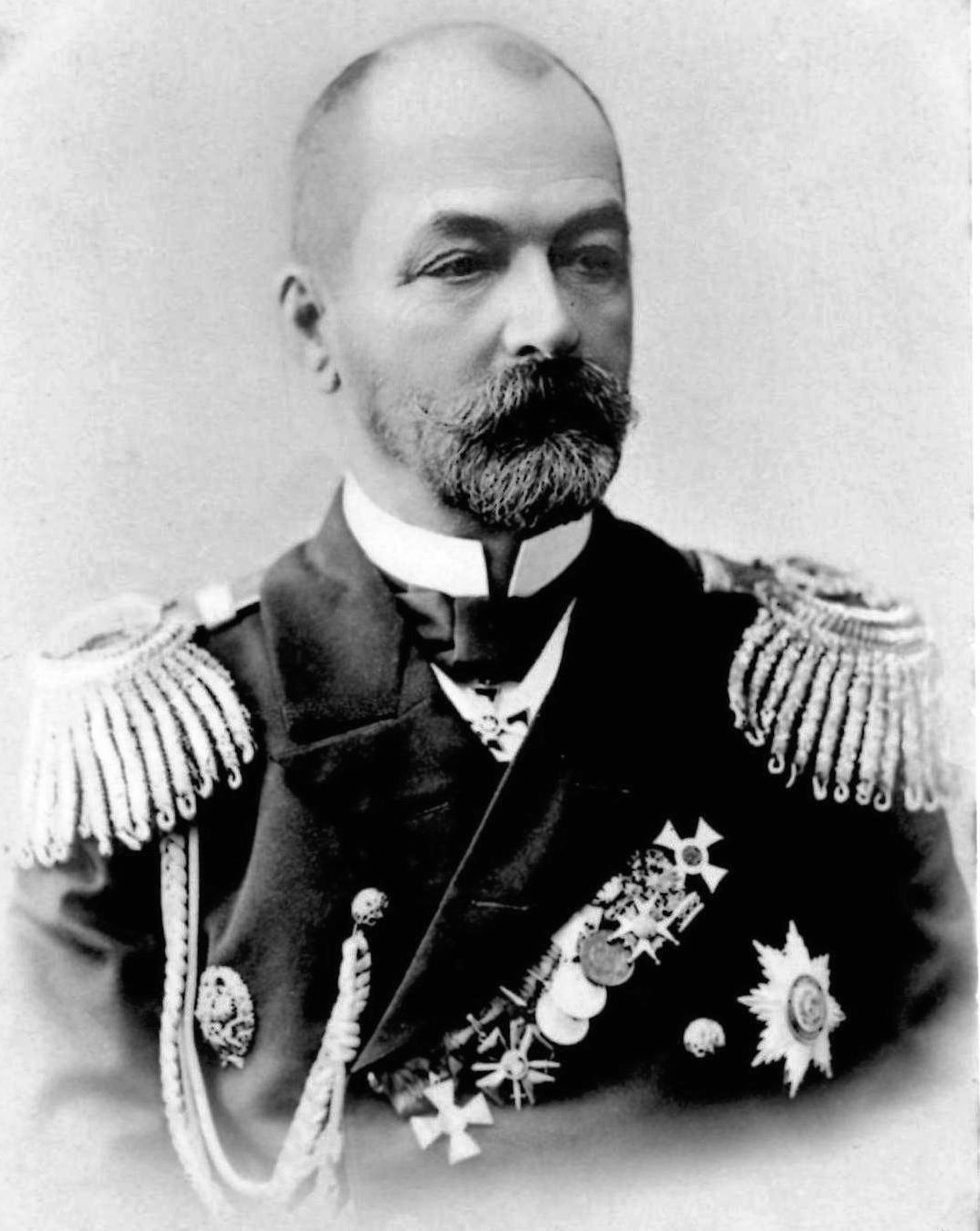
- Rozhestvensky c. 1904–1905
- Born: Zinovy Petrovich Rozhestvensky; November 11, 1848
- Died: January 14, 1909 (aged 60); Saint Petersburg, Russian Empire
- Burial place: Alexander Nevsky Lavra
- Education: Naval Cadet Corps
- Spouse: Olga Antipova (m. 1877)
- Children: 1
- Military career
- Known for: Baltic Expedition
- Military career
- Allegiance: Russian Empire
- Branch: Imperial Russian Navy
- Service years: 1868–1906
- Rank: Vice Admiral
- Nickname: Mad Dog
- Commands: Baltic Fleet; Knyaz Suvorov
- Conflicts: Russo-Turkish War; Russo-Japanese War; Dogger Bank incident; Battle of Tsushima (WIA) (surrendered)
- Awards: See § Awards

Zinovy Petrovich Rozhestvensky (Russian: Зиновий Петрович Рожественский, tr. Zinoviy Petrovich Rozhestvenskiy; 11 November [O.S. 30 October] 1848 – January 14, 1909) was a Russian admiral of the Imperial Russian Navy. He was in command of the Second Pacific Squadron in the Battle of Tsushima, during the Russo-Japanese War.

Under Admiral Rozhestvensky's command, the Russian navy accomplished a feat of steaming an all-steel, coal-powered battleship fleet over 18,000 miles (29,000 km) one way to engage an enemy in decisive battle (the Battle of Tsushima, which ended in a disastrous defeat of the Russian force.) The Knyaz Suvorov, one of four brand-new battleships of the French-designed Borodino class, was his flagship for the voyage to the Pacific.

== Early naval career ==
Rozhestvensky was the son of a physician from St Petersburg, and joined the Imperial Russian Navy at the age of 17. He graduated from the Sea Cadet Corps, where he mastered English and French, in 1868, and the Mikhailovsky Artillery Academy in 1873. He initially served with the Baltic Fleet as a gunnery officer. In 1876 he transferred to the Black Sea Fleet.

During the Russo-Turkish War Rozhestvensky served on board the gunboat Vesta. On June 10, 1877, six torpedo boats, five of which were armed with spar torpedoes, attempted to attack four ironclads of the Ottoman Navy at Sulina. Rozhestvensky volunteered to lead the first attack against the Turkish warships but his torpedo boat became caught up in the rope boom defenses that protected the enemy ships. The attack was beaten back by Turkish gunfire which destroyed one torpedo boat and the remaining boats withdrew, leaving the enemy ironclads intact. In July 1877 while still assigned to Vesta, he engaged and damaged an Ottoman battleship, Feth-i Bülend, in a five-hour battle. Rozhestvensky was awarded the Order of Saint Vladimir and Order of St George for this action and was promoted to lieutenant commander. However, after the war he revealed in a newspaper article that he had falsified his reports, and that the overloaded Feth-i Bülend escaped with only minor damage. This revelation had no adverse impact on his career. From 1883 to 1885 Rozhestensky was seconded to the newly formed Bulgarian Navy. He also designed a defense plan for the Bulgarian coastline, and was one of the founders of the Technology Association of Bulgaria.

Rozhestvensky returned to Russian service and was senior officer on the battery ship Kreml and the cruiser Gerzog Edinburgski. He then commanded the clipper Naezdnik and gunboat Grozyachiy. From 1891 to 1893 he was naval attaché to London. In 1894 he commanded the Vladimir Monomakh which was part of the Russian Mediterranean Squadron under the command of Admiral Stepan Makarov. From 1896 to 1898 he commanded the coast defence ship Pervenets. In 1898 he was promoted to rear admiral and became commander of the gunnery school of the Baltic Fleet. In 1900 he commanded the salvage operation for the General Admiral Graf Apraksin. In 1902 he was appointed Chief of the Naval Staff and proposed a plan for strengthening the Imperial Russian Navy in the Far East.

== Russo-Japanese War ==
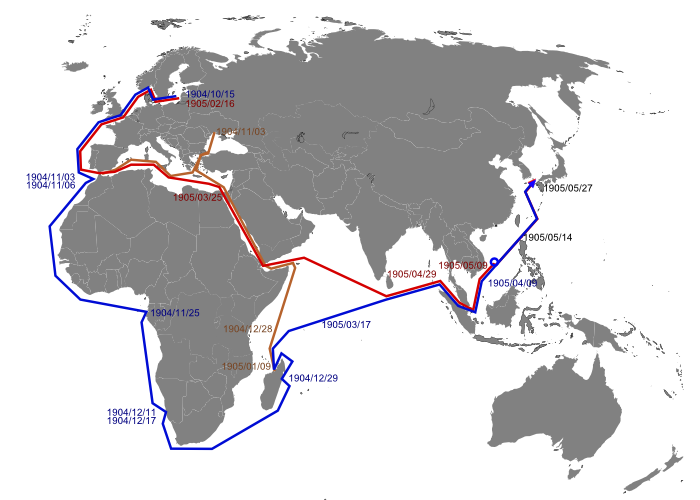
Route of Baltic Fleet to the Battle of Tsushima.

Prior to the war against Japan starting in 1904, Rozhestvensky was commander of the Baltic Fleet. Tsar Nicholas II ordered Rozhestvensky to take the Baltic Fleet to East Asia to protect the Russian naval base of Port Arthur. Rozhestvensky believed from the start that the plan to send the Baltic Fleet to Port Arthur was ill-conceived, and vehemently opposed plans to include a motley collection of obsolete vessels, the Third Pacific Squadron to his fleet (referred to by the Admiral and his staff as the 'self-sinkers'), to the extent of refusing to reveal to the Admiralty his exact routing from Madagascar and to share his battle plan with Third Pacific Squadron commander Nikolai Nebogatov.

The Tsar had selected the right man for the job, for it would take an iron-fisted commander to sail an untested fleet of brand new battleships (for some of the new Borodinos, this voyage was their shakedown cruise) and new untrained sailors on the longest coal-powered battleship fleet voyage in recorded history. Rozhestvensky was fully aware that he had a new untrained fleet under his command; and that both the shakedown testing of the new battleships and the gunnery practice/training would have to occur during the voyage.

As a consequence of these circumstances, the mission-minded commander would sometimes fire service ammunition (live gunfire) across the bows of an errant warship, and in a fiery moment fling his binoculars from the bridge into the sea. When his battleship fleet set sail in 1904, Rozhestvensky's staff ensured that his flagship, Knyaz Suvorov, had a good supply of binoculars on board. Rozhestvensky had a fiery temper when dealing with a subordinate, and both officers and men knew to stand clear of "Mad Dog" when a subordinate either disobeyed orders, was incompetent, or both.

Nevertheless, the inexperience of the Russian Baltic Fleet almost triggered a war between Russia and Great Britain as it sailed through the North Sea. After several Russian ships mistook British fishing trawlers at Dogger Bank for torpedo boats from the Imperial Japanese Navy, they opened fire on the unarmed civilian vessels. The Dogger Bank incident on the night of 21–22 October 1904 resulted in the deaths of three British fishermen and many wounded. One sailor and a priest aboard a Russian cruiser were also killed in the crossfire.

The Russian government agreed to investigate the incident following a great deal of international diplomatic pressure. Rozhestvensky was ordered to dock in Vigo, Spain, while battleships of the Royal Navy from the British Home Fleet were prepared for war. Several British cruiser squadrons shadowed Rozhestvensky's fleet as it made its way through the Bay of Biscay. On arrival in Spain, Rozhestvensky left behind those officers he considered responsible for the incident (as well as at least one officer who had been critical of him). On November 25, 1904, the British and the Russian governments signed a joint agreement in which they agreed to submit the issue to an International Commission of Inquiry at The Hague. On February 26, 1905, the commission published its report. It criticized Rozhestvensky for allowing his ships to fire upon the British ships, but noted that "as each [Russian] vessel swept the horizon in every direction with her searchlights to avoid being taken by surprise, it was difficult to prevent confusion". The report also concluded that once the mistake was known "Admiral Rozhestvensky personally did everything he could, from beginning to end of the incident, to prevent [the trawlers] from being fired upon by the squadron". Russia eventually paid £66,000 (£5.8m today) in compensation.

Concerns that the draught of the newer battleships, which had proven to be considerably greater than designed, would prevent their passage through the Suez Canal caused the fleet to separate after leaving Tangiers on 3 November 1904. These concerns though may have been an excuse to hide worries over passing through British controlled waters. The newer battleships and a few cruisers proceeded around the Cape of Good Hope under Rozhestvensky while the older battleships and lighter cruisers passed through the Suez Canal under the command of Admiral Dmitry Gustavovich von Fölkersahm. Both sections of the fleet then rendezvoused at Madagascar as planned.

Few re-coaling stations would be available during the journey, due to Britain's alliance with Japan. After the Dogger Bank incident, the British pressured the French and Portuguese not to let the Russians fleet in their colonial ports, forcing the Russians to recoal in the open ocean or at anchorages which was much more inefficient. Being denied docking at ports also exacerbated existing problems in the fleet, such as rotting food supplies, irregular mail delivery, and lack of shore leave. All of these plus the long voyage further sapped Russia sailors' health and morale, so for the upcoming battle they would be facing Japanese sailors who were well-rested by contrast.

Remote and distrustful of his staff, Rozhestvensky grew increasingly bitter and pessimistic as he approached Asia. Almost as soon as the Baltic Fleet arrived in the Far East in May 1905, it was engaged by the Japanese Navy at the decisive Battle of Tsushima (27–28 May 1905) in the Sea of Japan.

=== Battle of Tsushima ===
Japanese Admiral Tōgō Heihachirō drew upon his experiences from the battles of Port Arthur and the Yellow Sea, and this time would not split his fires nor engage Rozhestvensky at excessive ranges, as he had done with Admiral Vitgeft at the Battle of the Yellow Sea the year previously. He would instead, with the proper use of reconnaissance vessels and Wireless communications position his battle fleet in such a way as to "preserve his interior lines of movement", which would allow him to have shorter distances to cover while causing Rozhestvensky to have longer distances to travel, regardless of battleship speeds.

Naval intelligence had already informed Togo of Rozhestvensky's mission, that of reaching Vladivostok, and avoiding contact with the Japanese navy if at all possible, and fighting as little as possible, if forced into it. Rozhestvensky's objective was to reinforce the Vladivostok Squadron, and then, when the Russian navy felt sufficiently prepared, they would engage the Japanese navy in a decisive action.

With this knowledge in possession, Togo planned on preempting the Russian plan, by positioning his battle fleet to "bring the Russian fleet to battle, regardless of the speed of either battlefleet." Admiral Togo was able to appear directly across Rozhestvensky's line of advance (Rozhestvensky's T had been crossed). With only most of his bow guns to use, Rozhestvensky's main batteries were "thrown successively out of bearing" as he continued to advance. Other than surrender or retreat, Rozhestvensky had but two choices; fight a pitched battle or charge Togo's battleline. He chose the former, and by the evening of 27 May 1905, Rozhestvensky's flagship and the majority of his fleet were on the bottom of the Tsushima Straits. The Russians had lost 5,000 sailors.

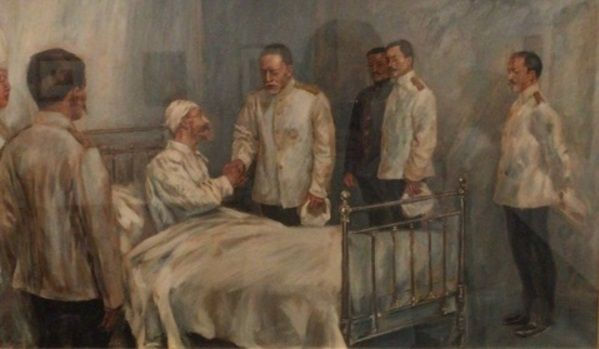
Admiral Tōgō Visits Rozhestvensky, by yōga painter Fujishima Takeji

During the battle, Rozhestvensky was wounded at least twice. The first time not seriously but the second time, he suffered significant injuries to the head and legs. He then retreated with the other survivors from the conning tower to the lower fighting position before leaving to find somewhere to observe the battle from. He was later found sitting in the remains of the ship's right 6-inch turret where he remained for about an hour before losing consciousness. The unconscious admiral was transferred to the destroyer Buiny. Rozhestvensky regained consciousness but may have been slipping in and out of delirium. Later, with the Buiny suffering from engine damage and running low on coal, he was transferred to the destroyer Bedovy. He was taken prisoner when the Bedovy was later captured by the Sazanami of the Imperial Japanese Navy. After the signing of the Treaty of Portsmouth he returned to St Petersburg via the Trans-Siberian Railway. The victorious Admiral Tōgō would later visit him (while being treated for his injuries in a Japanese hospital), comforting him with kind words:

Defeat is a common fate of a soldier. There is nothing to be ashamed of in it. The great point is whether we have performed our duty.

With the end of the war Rozhestvensky left Japan on November 23 aboard the transport Yakut. This has been delayed by a bit over a week first by Rozhestvensky's insistence on taking a Russian ship but then by riots in Vladivostok and mutiny on the first ship he attempted to take.

=== Aftermath ===
In 1906, Rozhestvensky faced court-martial for the disaster, along with each of his surviving battleship commanders. Some were sentenced to prison and some to firing squad for either losing the battle or surrendering on the high seas. The Tsar's court was fully aware that Admiral Nikolai Nebogatov had surrendered the Russian fleet, as Rozhestvensky had been wounded and unconscious for most of the battle, and was very reluctant to accept his statements of responsibility. Nonetheless, Rozhestvensky was adamant in his defense of his subordinate commanders and maintained total responsibility, pleading guilty to losing the battle. As was expected (and hoped) by the courts, the Tsar commuted the death-sentenced captains to short prison terms and pardons for the remaining officers.

== Later life ==
Rozhestvensky lived out the last years of his life quietly in St Petersburg. He died in the early hours of New Year's Day 1909 and was buried in the Alexander Nevsky Lavra.

== Personal life ==
He married Olga Antipova with whom he had one daughter. He had a number of affairs including beginning around 1900 one with Capitalina Makarova the wife of admiral Stepan Makarov.

== Awards ==
- Order of St. George, 4th class
- Order of St. Vladimir, 3rd class and 4th class with ribbon
- Order of St. Anna, 2nd and 3rd classes
- Order of St. Stanislav, 1st, 2nd and 3rd classes

== See also ==
- Nikolai Kolomeitsev
