= Russian destroyer Steregushchiy (1903) =

Sokol-class destroyer

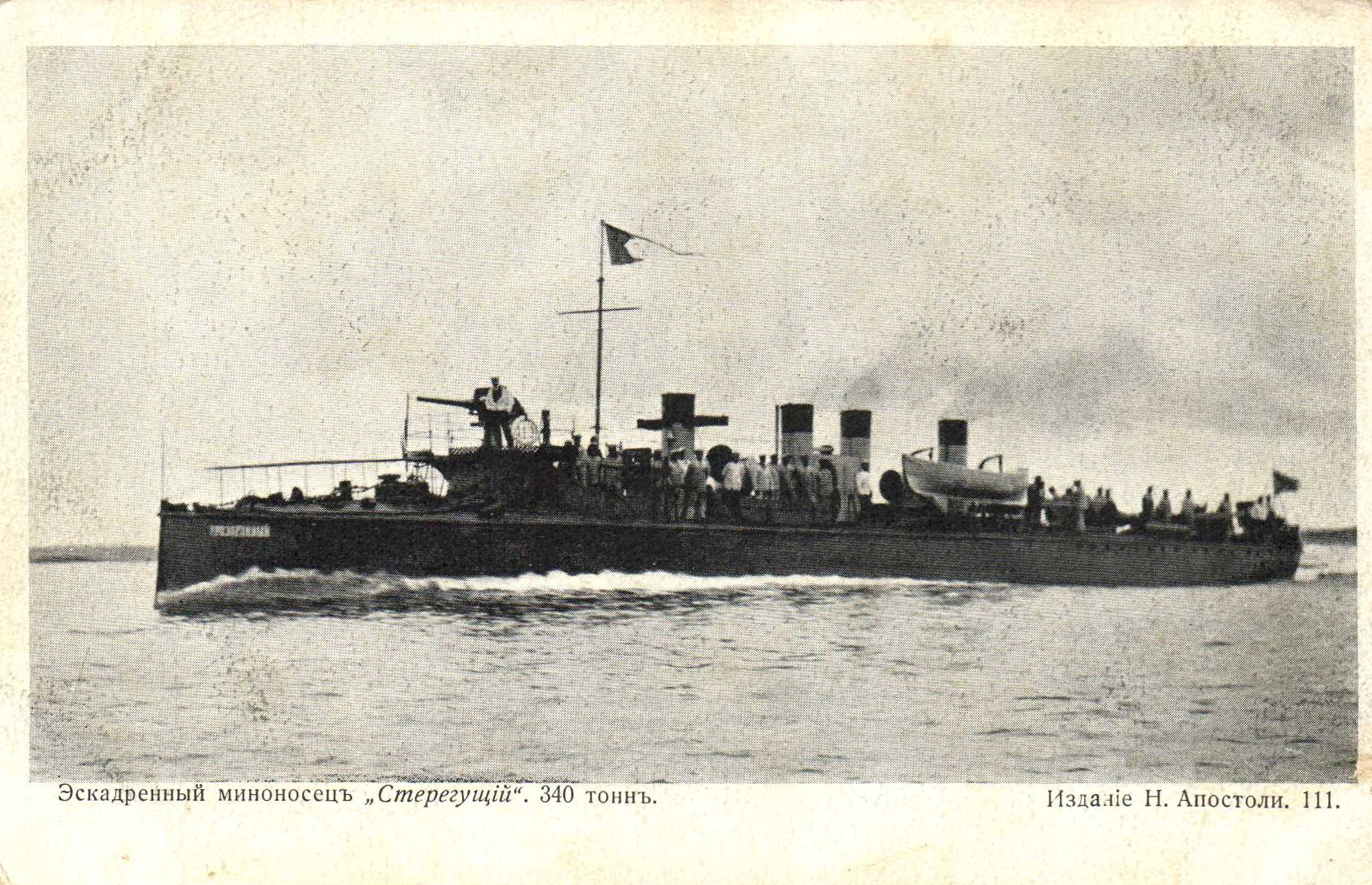
- Photograph purportedly of Steregushchiy from a series of post cards depicting warships of the Imperial Russian Navy, although the name on her bow indicates a name starting with "P" (Cyrillic "П"), suggesting it is a photograph of a different Sokol-class destroyer, perhaps Prozorliviy.

History

Russian Empire
- Name: Kulik
- Namesake: Curlew
- Builder: Nevsky Works, Saint Petersburg, Russia
- Laid down: 1900
- Launched: June 1902
- Renamed: Steregushchiy
- Namesake: Guardian
- Commissioned: August 1903
- Fate: Sunk 10 March [O.S. 26 February] 1904

General characteristics
- Type: Sokol-class destroyer
- Displacement: 258 long tons (262 t)
- Length: 57.91 m (190 ft 0 in)
- Beam: 5.67 m (18 ft 7 in)
- Draught: 2.3 m (7 ft 7 in)
- Propulsion: 2 x vertical triple expansion steam engines, 8 x Yarrow boilers, 3,800 hp (2,834 kW), 2 shafts, 60 tons coal
- Speed: 25.75 knots (47.69 km/h; 29.63 mph)
- Range: 660 nautical miles (1,200 km; 760 mi)
- Complement: 52 (4 officers, 48 enlisted men)
- Armament: 1 × 75 mm gun; 3 × 47 mm guns; 2 × single 381 mm (15 in) torpedo tubes, 2 x torpedoes (as built); 2 x single 450 mm (18 in) torpedo tubes, 2 x torpedoes (1905)

Service record
- Operations: Russo-Japanese War; Battle of Port Arthur

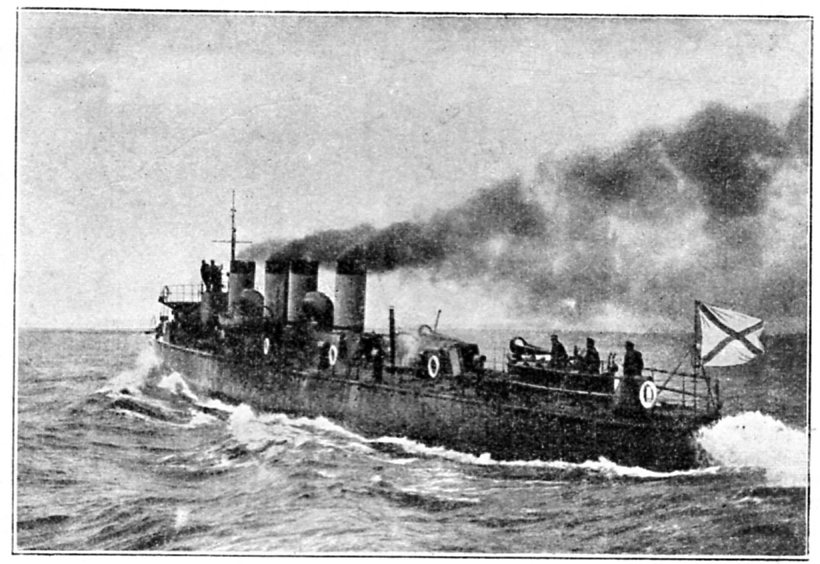
Steregushchiy underway, from the Russian magazine Niva, No.11, 26 March [O.S. 13 March] 1904.

Steregushchiy (Стерегущий, English "Guardian") was a Sokol-class destroyer built for the Imperial Russian Navy at the beginning of the 20th century. She served in the Russo-Japanese War (1904–1905), seeing action in the Battle of Port Arthur before she was sunk in 1904.

== Construction and commissioning ==
Laid down in 1900 in Saint Petersburg, Russia, at the Nevsky Works, Steregushchiy was shipped in pieces to the Imperial Russian Navy base at Port Arthur, China, and assembled there. Launched at Port Arthur in June 1902 with the name Kulik (Кулик, English "Curlew"), she subsequently was renamed Steregushchiy. She entered service at Port Arthur in August 1903.

== Service history ==
Steregushchiy was at Port Arthur when the Russo-Japanese War began on the evening of 8 February [O.S. 26 January] 1904 with the Battle of Port Arthur, a surprise Imperial Japanese Navy attack on Russian ships in the outer roadstead there. At dawn on 9 February [O.S. 27 January] 1904, two pairs of Russian destroyers – one of them consisting of Steregushchiy and her sister ship Reshitel‘nyi — sortied to attack the Japanese ships off Port Arthur. The Japanese opened gunfire on the Russian destroyers, preventing them from getting close enough to launch torpedoes, and they received orders to return to Port Arthur. Several Japanese shells struck Steregushchiy, but Reshitel‘nyi received no hits.

On the night of 9–10 March [O.S. 25–26 February] 1904, the 2nd Destroyer Detachment, consisting of Steregushchiy and Reshitel‘nyi, conducted a reconnaissance of either the Elliot Islands in the Yellow Sea or the inner harbor at Thornton Haven on the coast of China, or perhaps both (sources are unclear). While returning to Port Arthur in the predawn hours of 10 March [O.S. 26 February] 1904, they had to alter course farther out to sea to avoid a Japanese cruiser and a force of Japanese destroyers. As they approached Port Arthur from the south-southeast they encountered another Japanese force consisting of the protected cruiser Chitose and the destroyers Akebono, Sazanami, Shinonome, and Usugumo. As the Japanese moved to cut them off from Port Arthur, Steregushchiy and Reshitel‘nyi turned to starboard and made for the shelter of Russian minefields off Dalniy. With superior speed, the Japanese destroyers closed to a range of 300 metres (330 yd), and the two sides opened gunfire on one another.

The Russians scored a number of hits on the Japanese ships, but at 06:40 a Japanese shell detonated in one of Steregushchiy′s coal bunkers, damaging two of her boilers and causing her speed to drop off quickly. Stoker Ivan Khirinsky, soon joined by Machinist 2nd Class Vasily Novikov, went to the upper deck to report the damage. Reshitel‘nyi also suffered a shell hit which knocked out one of her boilers, but she managed to keep her speed up and reach waters within range of Russian coastal artillery at daybreak. As Reshitel‘nyi again altered course toward Port Arthur, where she arrived safely, the coastal artillery opened fire on the Japanese and discouraged them from continuing the chase.

Giving up their pursuit of Reshitel‘nyi, the Japanese closed with the limping Steregushchiy. The Japanese destroyers were larger and more heavily armed than Steregushchiy, and they opened an overwhelming fire on her in broad daylight. Chitose and the Japanese armored cruiser Tokiwa also joined the action. Below deck aboard Steregushchiy, Fireman Quartermaster Pyotr Khasanov and Fireman Aleksey Osinin tried to repair her damage, but another shell exploded in her No. 2 boiler room, wounding Osinin and opening a hole in the hull through which water entered the compartment and flooded the fireboxes. After closing the boiler room's hatches behind them, the men climbed to the upper deck.

During the unequal fight, Japanese shell hits brought down all of Steregushchiy′s funnels and masts. Her commanding officer, Lieutenant Alexander Semyonovich Sergeev, and gunnery officer, Midshipman Konstantin V. Kudrevich, died at their posts. Her executive officer, Lieutenant Nikolai S. Goloviznin II, was killed while trying to launch her whaleboat. Her engineering officer, Vladimir Spiridonovich Anastasov, was blown overboard by the explosion of a Japanese shell. One by one, Steregushchiy′s guns fell silent, and by 07:10 she was a motionless wreck with her hull mangled and almost her entire crew dead or dying. She struck her colors to surrender.

The Japanese ships ceased fire and gathered around the destroyers′ flagship Usugumo, finding that Usugumo and Shinonome had sustained only minor damage, Sazanami had suffered eight shell hits and Akebono had taken about 30 hits, and the Japanese destroyers had suffered a number of killed and wounded. The Japanese attempted to take possession of the Russian destroyer, but Steregushchiy′s crew had opened her Kingston valves to scuttle her, and two members of her crew locked themselves in her engine room to prevent the Japanese from closing the valves, sacrificing their lives to ensure that she sank. At 08:10, a Japanese tug arrived, and Sazanami began an attempt to tow Steregushchiy to port. At around the same time, however, the Russian armored cruiser Bayan and protected cruiser Novik approached under the personal command of the commander of the Russian First Pacific Squadron, Vice admiral Stepan Osipovich Makarov, and the Japanese abandoned their towing attempt, rescued Steregushchiy′s four surviving crew members – Khirinsky, Osinin, Novikov, and Acting Boatswain Fyodor Yuryev – and withdrew to avoid combat. At 09:07, Steregushchiy sank 7 nautical miles (13 km; 8.1 mi) southeast of Mount Laoteshan and 6 nautical miles (11 km; 6.9 mi) from the Lushun Lighthouse with the loss of 49 members of her crew.

== Honors, awards, and commemoration ==
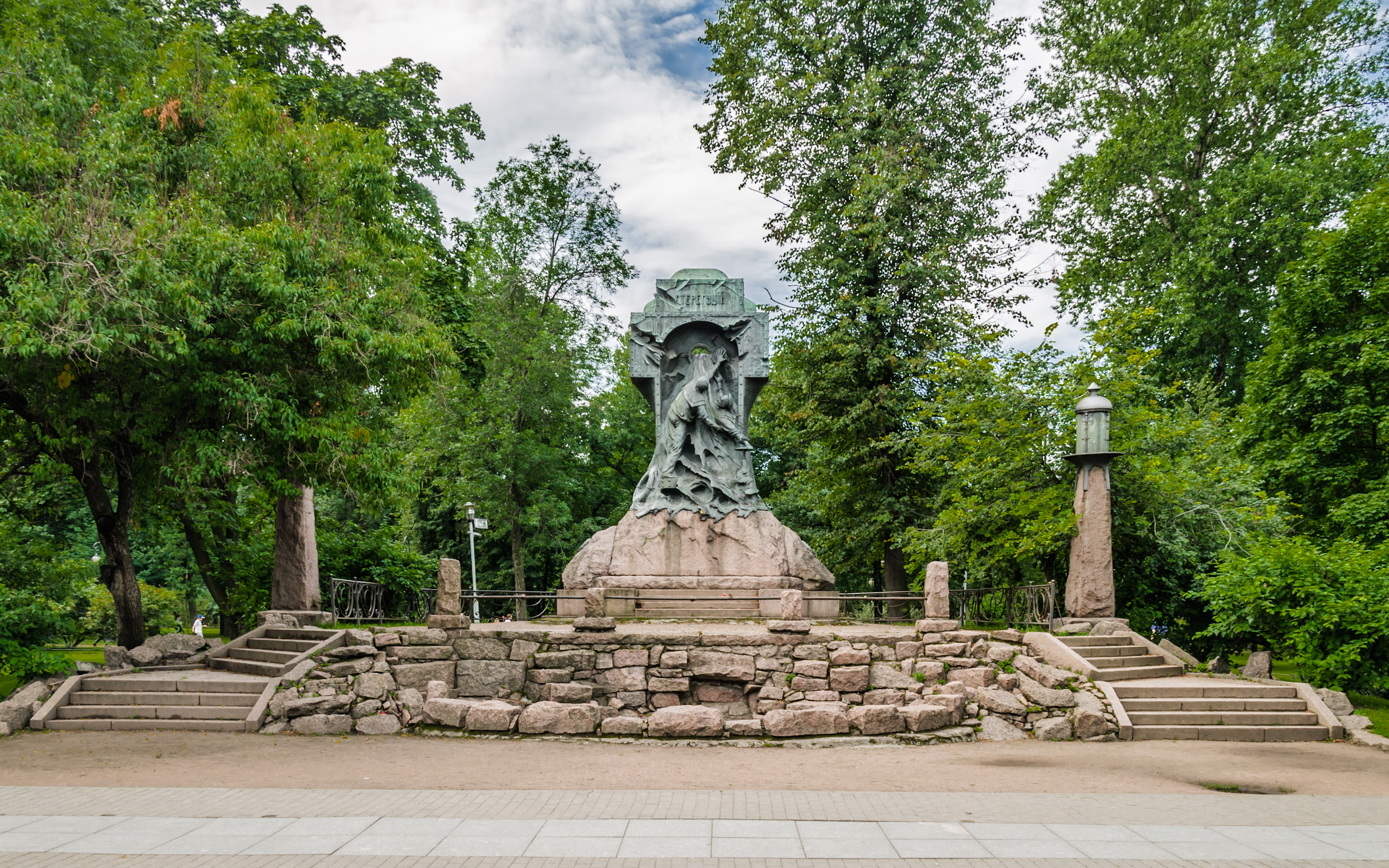
The Steregushchiy memorial in Alexander Park in St. Petersburg, Russia, on 26 July 2012.

Upon their repatriation to Russia, Khirinsky, Osinin, Novikov, and Yuryev were award the Cross of St. George.

On 23 May [O.S. 10 May] 1911, a monument dedicated to Steregushchiy′s loss in action was opened in Alexander Park on Kamennoostrovsky Prospekt in St. Petersburg in the presence of Emperor Nicholas II. The sculptor Konstantin Vasilievich Isenberg and the architect Aleksandr Ivanovich von Gauguin designed the monument, Professor V. N. Sokolovsky made the calculations for its foundation, and V. Z. Gavrilov cast the sculpture. The monument depicts two sailors – V. Novikov and I. Bukharev – opening Steregushchiy′s Kingston valves to scuttle her and prevent her capture by the Japanese. In May 1911, the Russian magazine Iskra published photographs of the monument's opening ceremony, with a caption under one of them reading "The monument to the heroes of the destroyer 'Steregushchiy' opened on May 10 in St. Petersburg in the Highest Presence with a stream of water pouring from an open porthole."

A later Imperial Russian Navy destroyer and two Soviet Navy destroyers have borne the name Steregushchiy in honor of the ship, as does the Russian Federation Navy corvette Steregushchiy, lead ship of the Steregushchiy-class corvettes.

In 1962, a small island in the Severnaya Zemlya archipelago in the Russian high Arctic was named after Steregushchiy.

An Imperial Russian Navy destroyer, Leitenant Sergeev, was named for Steregushchiy′s commanding officer Alexander Semyonovich Sergeev. In Kursk, Sergeev's home town, School No. 18 is named for him. The school's anthem, "Pesnya o 'Steregushchem'" (Песня о „Стерегущем», English "Song of the Guardian"), with music by Viktor Mezentsev and lyrics by Vasily Zolotorev, was first performed on 10 March 2004.

The Imperial Russian Navy torpedo boat Inzhener-mekhanik Anastasov was named for Steregushchiy′s engineering officer, Vladimir Spiridonovich Anastasov.

== In popular culture ==
The popular song "Gibel' „Steregushchego“" ("Гибель „Стерегущего“", English "The Death of the Guardian"), performed by the singer Zhanna Bichevskaya, is about the sinking of Steregushchiy.

Steregushchiy′s final battle is mentioned in the book Kreysera (Крейсера, English "Cruisers") by Valentin Pikul.

Aleksandr Kharitanovsky based his novel Gospoda Ofitsery! (Господа офицеры!, English "Gentlemen Officers!") on the fate of Sergeev and Steregushchiy.
