= Yabiji =

Coral reef group in Japan

- IUCN category III (natural monument or feature)
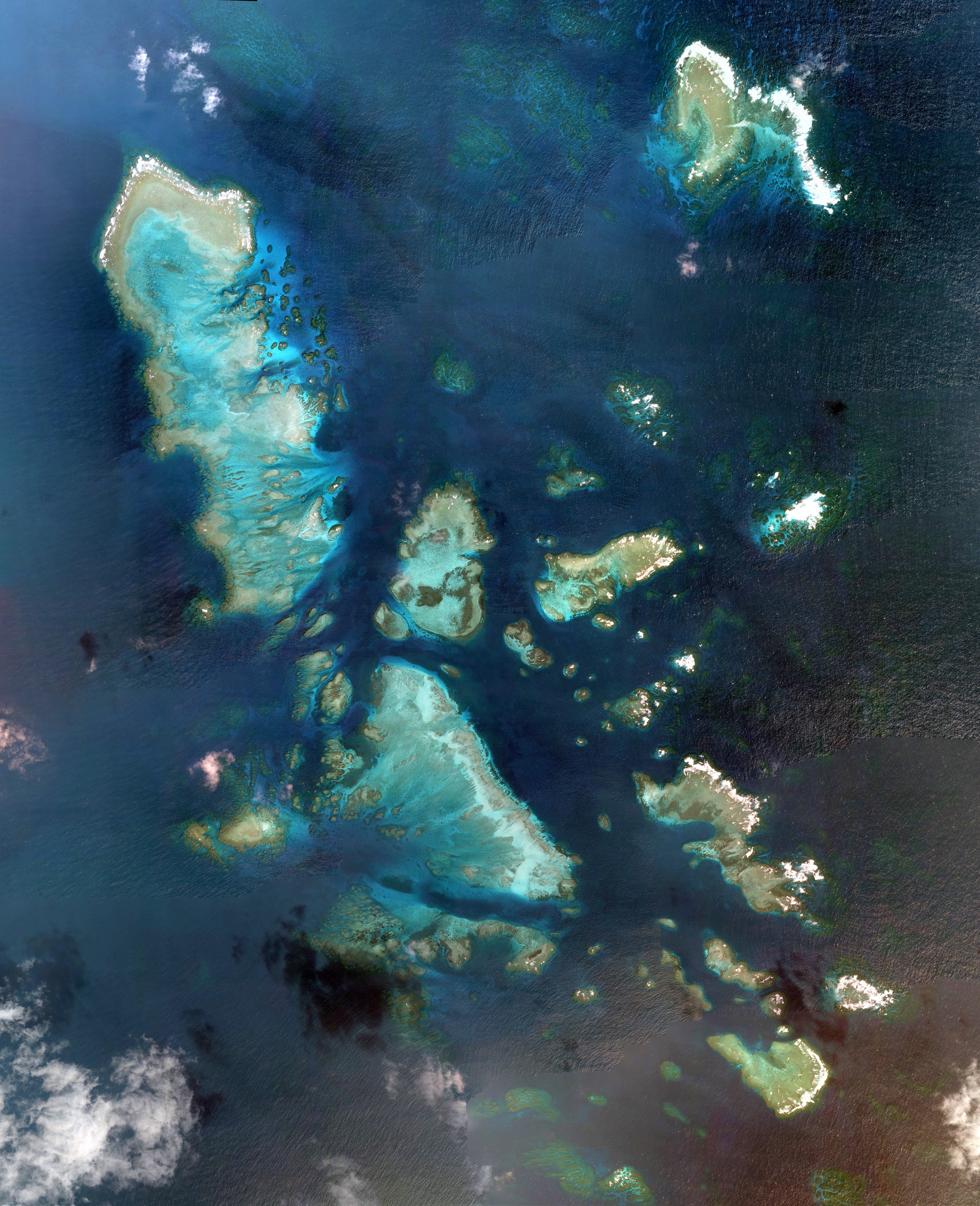
- Aerial view of Yabiji in 2008.

- Location within Okinawa Prefecture Location within Japan
- Location: Miyako Islands, Okinawa Prefecture, Japan
- Nearest city: Miyakojima
- Coordinates: 25°00′N 125°16′E
- Length: 17 km (11 mi)
- Width: 6.5 km (4.0 mi)
- Elevation: 0
- Established: March 27, 2013
- National Place of Scenic Beauty Natural Monument

Map

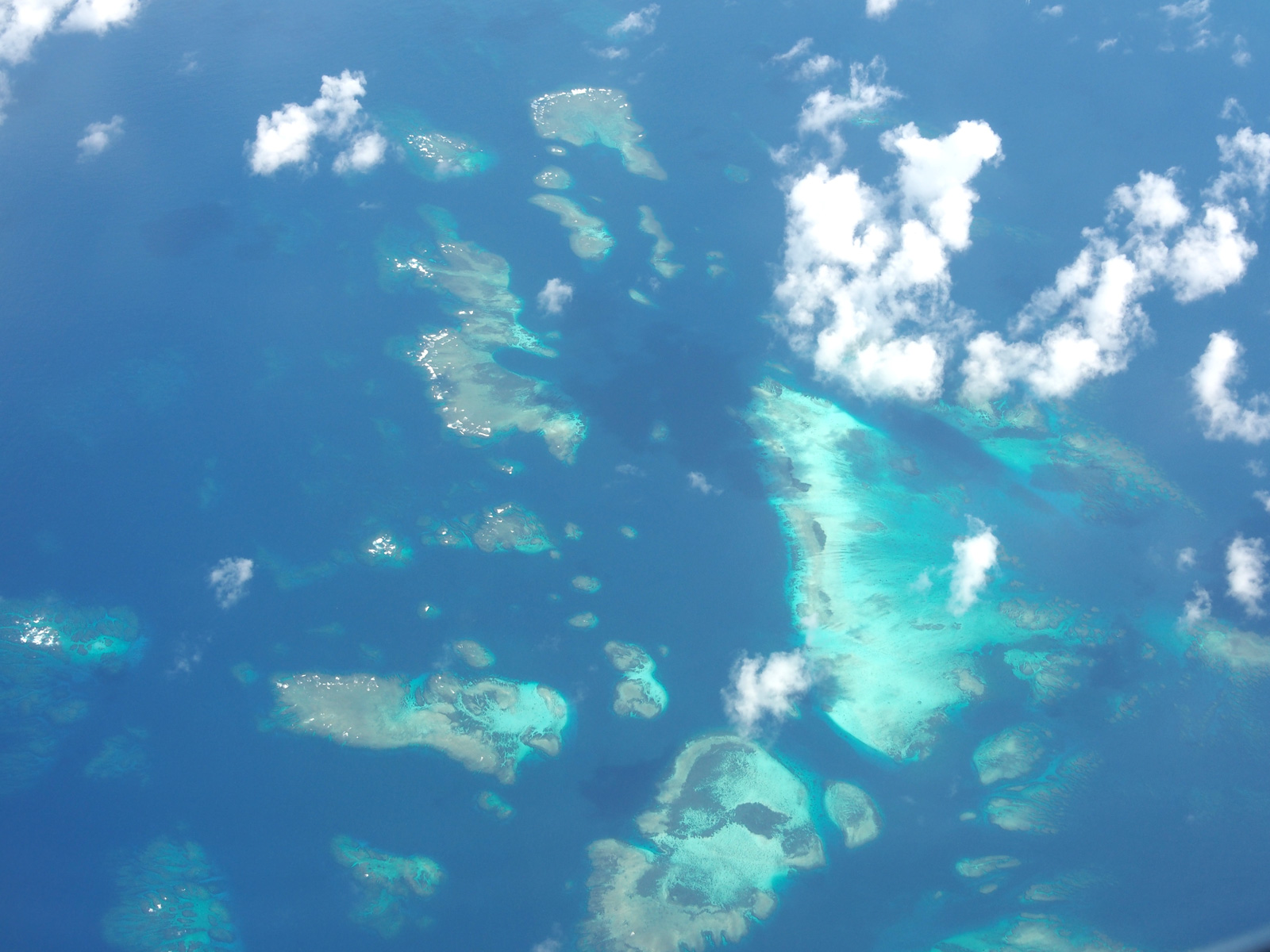
Yabiji from the north.

Yabiji (八重干瀬; Miyako: /jaːpɨ̥ɕi/), also known as Yaebiji, Yaebise, Yaebishi, and Yapiji and appearing on some historical Western nautical charts as Providence Reef, is the largest coral reef group in Japan. Located in the Miyako Islands, it contains over 100 coral reefs. Known for being above water level several times a year, most visibly around March 3 of the lunar calendar (around the beginning of April in the Gregorian calendar), it was made a Natural Monument of Japan in 2013.

== Geography ==
Centered roughly around 25°00′N 125°16′E, Yabiji stretches across an area between 5 or 6 kilometres (3.1 or 3.7 mi; 2.7 or 3.2 nmi) and 22 kilometres (14 mi; 12 nmi) north of Ikema Island in the Miyako Islands in Okinawa Prefecture in the Ryukyu Islands. It measures about 17 kilometres (11 mi; 9.2 nmi) from north to south and 6.5 kilometres (4.0 mi; 3.5 nmi) from east to west. It is formed by a cluster of smaller coral reefs (reef groups) centered on eight large coral reefs that form what is known as the Main Reef (or Great Reef). The total number of coral reefs is over 100.

Most of the reefs that make up Yabiji are named after various parts of the human body, such as Kanamara (カナマラ), meaning head, Du (ドゥ) meaning torso, or body in Ryukyuan, and Ifu (胃) meaning stomach. Other reefs in Yabiji are named for animals, for example, Budai (ブダイ), meaning parrotfish. The reefs also have local names, such as Irautsu (要ら打つ), meaning "exile", and Fugausa (フガウサ), meaning "flea", and there are about 130 of these names..

The Main Reef extends from north to south with the largest of its eight reefs, Du ("Torso"), at its center, and parallel to it are two to three rows of table reefs, other reefs, and shoals. Yabiji′s structure is geographically consistent with the direction of the geological structure of the Miyako Islands, and it is estimated that the lower part of Yabiji has the same geology as the Miyakos. There is a strong possibility that the lower part of Yabiji was dry land during the Last Glacial Period.

Yabiji is usually below the sea surface, but some parts emerge above the surface during low spring tides. In particular, during the period from spring to summer when the tidal range is large, there are some reefs that appear on the sea surface like islands, leading to Yabiji sometimes being called the "Phantom Continent." The greatest tidal difference of the year is on March 3 of the lunar calendar (around early April in the Gregorian calendar).

Yabiji′s intermittent land area during low tides is approximately one-tenth that of Miyako Island, which has an area of 158.70 square kilometres (61.27 sq mi; 46.27 sq nmi). Including reefs and reef slopes that never rise above the sea surface, Yabiji′s area is approximately one-third that of Miyako Island.

== Name ==
There are various views on the origin of the name Yabiji. According to one explanation, the name is derived from Yabiji being made up of eight main coral reefs, while another claims that the name is based on Yabiji being formed from layers of reefs.

There are variations of Yabiji′s name in different localities. The reef group is called "Yabiji" on Ikema Island and in the Shimajiri area of Miyakojima, but in the Karimata area of Miyakojima it is called "Yapiji." It also sometimes is called or transliterated as "Yaebiji", "Yaebise", and "Yaebishi."

In 1999, the Geospatial Information Authority of Japan called for standardization of the name upon the publication of a 1/25,000-scale topographic map of Yabiji, and the city of Hirara (which in 2005 became part of the city of Miyakojima) decided to make "Yabiji" the official name because that was the name used on Ikema Island, the island closest to Yabiji, and also because municipal events traditionally used the name "Yabiji" as well.

== Culture and recreation ==
Each year on March 3 of the lunar calendar (around the beginning of April in the Gregorian calendar), when the largest annual tidal difference takes place in Yabiji, a traditional event known in the Miyako Islands as Sanitsu (サニツ), meaning "going down the beach", takes place in which women gather to drive off bad luck and ward off evil spirits.

Yabiji is a good fishing ground because it is home to coral colonies. It is a popular spot for freediving, scuba diving, snorkeling, and recreational fishing.

== Flora and fauna ==
Yabiji′s reefs contain about 300 kinds of coral.

Coral reefs and sea life in Yabiji

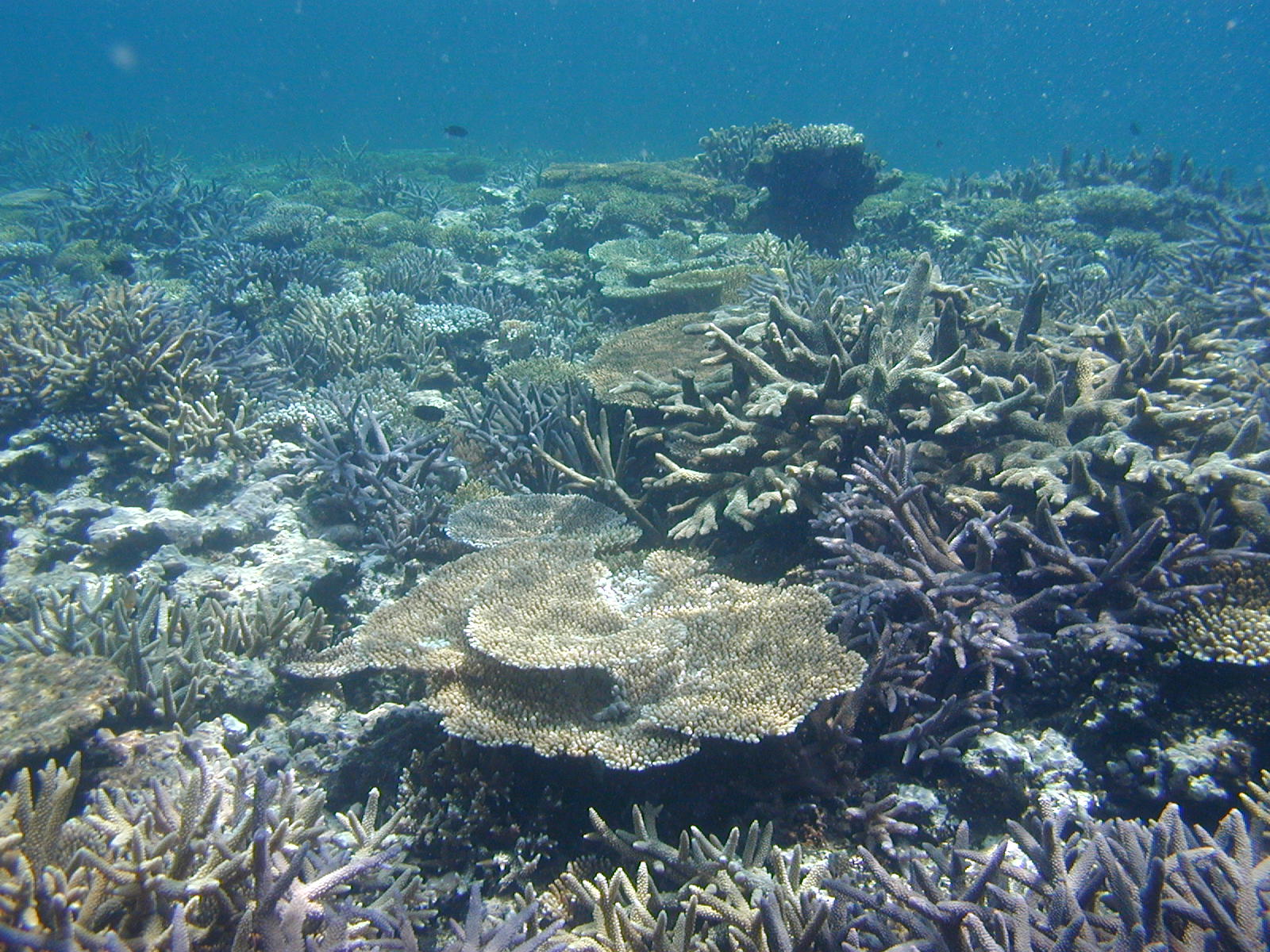
Coral reef

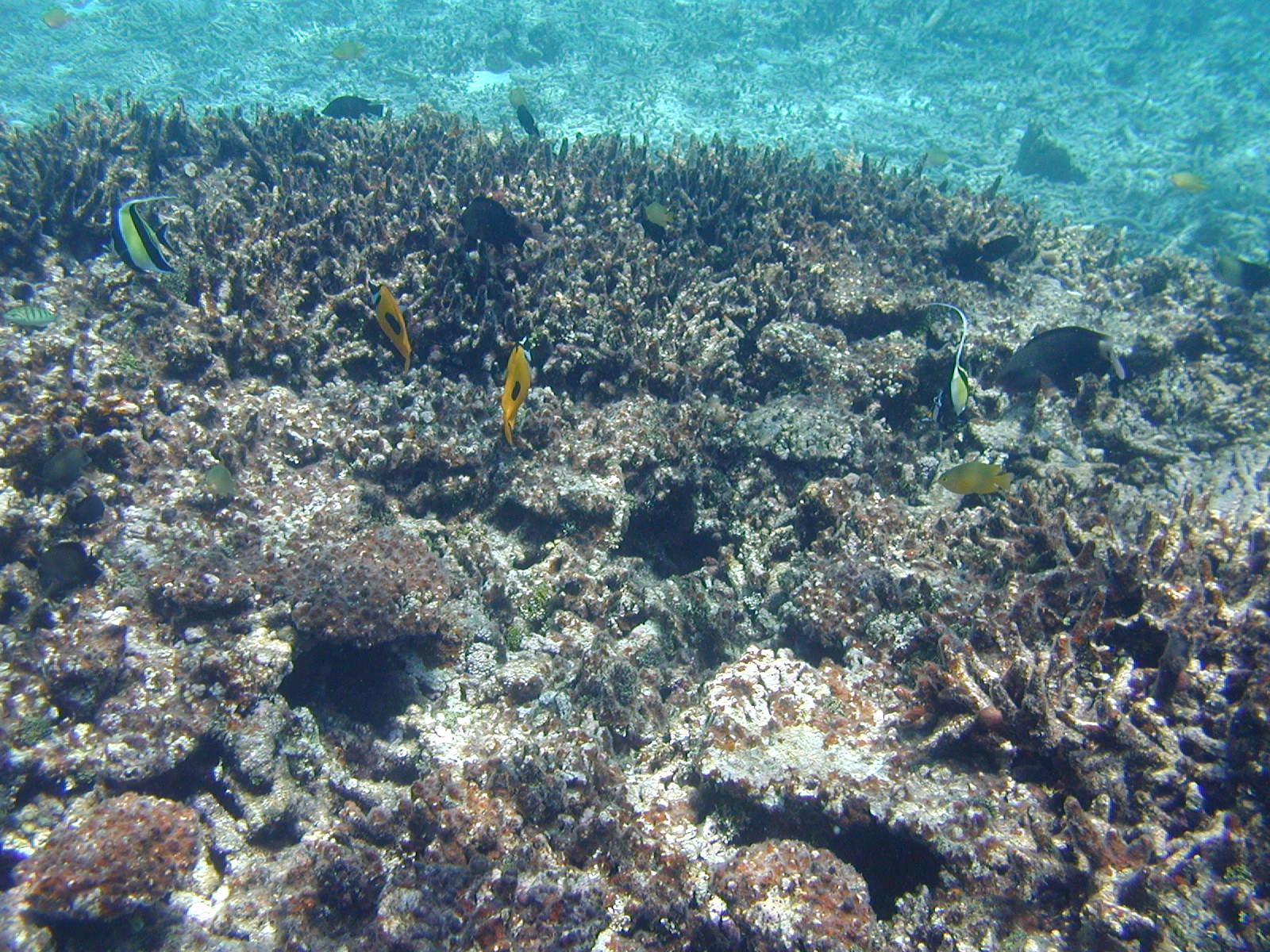
Coral reef

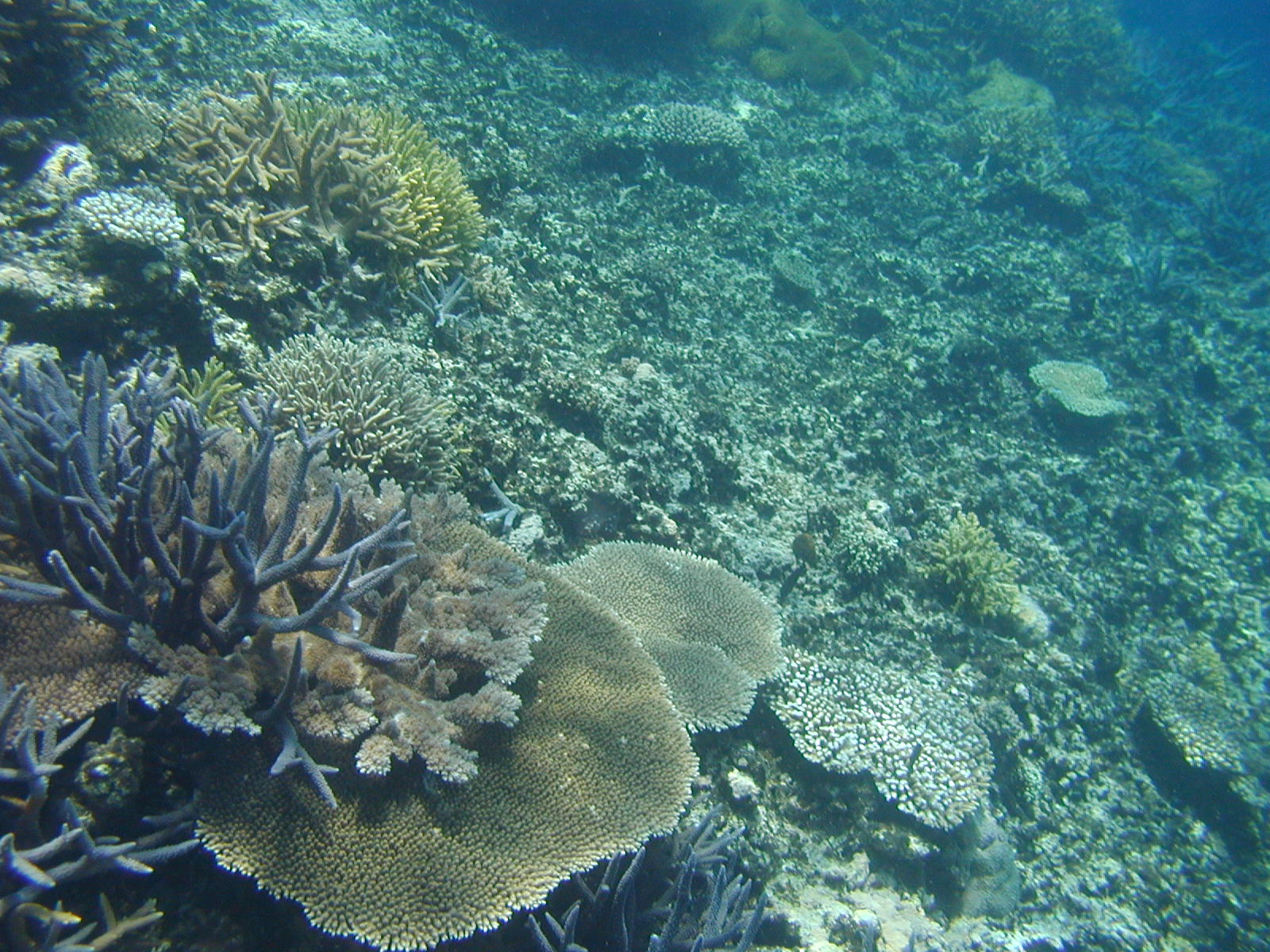
Coral reef

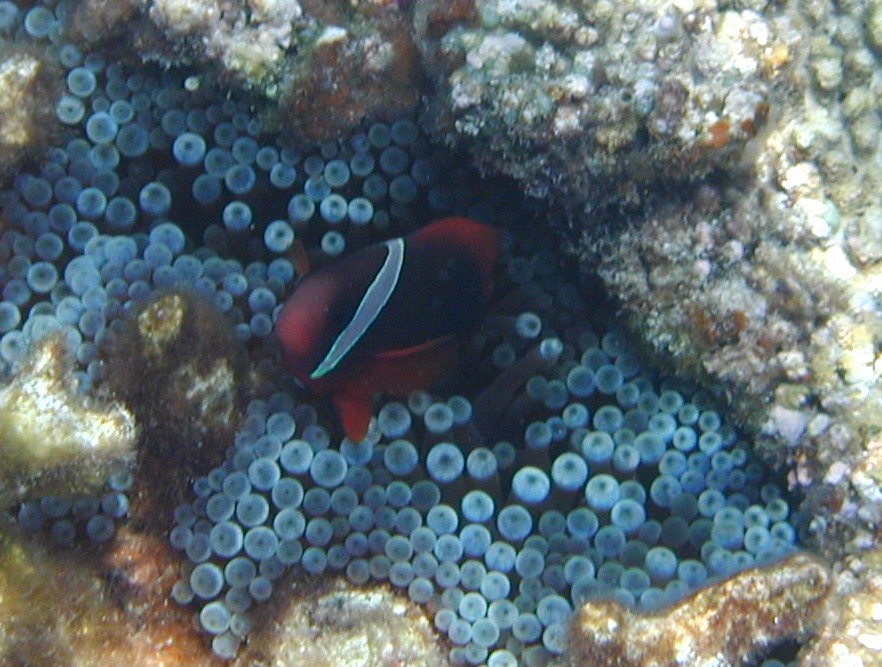
Anemonefish

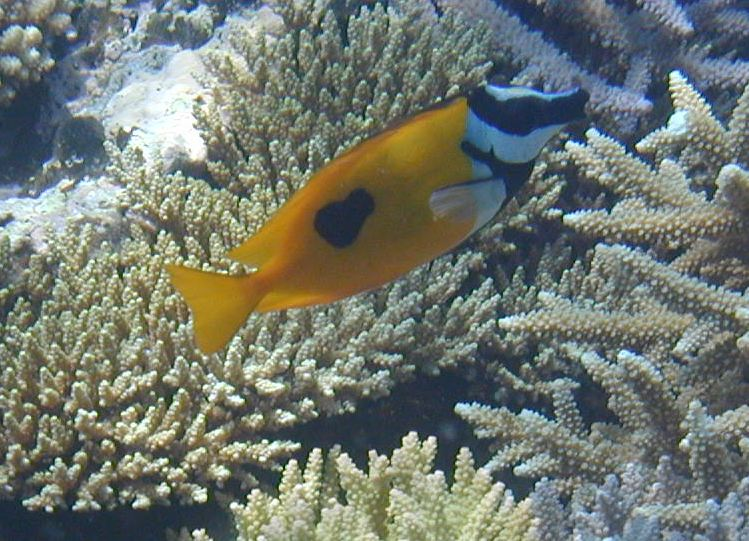
Foxface rabbitfish

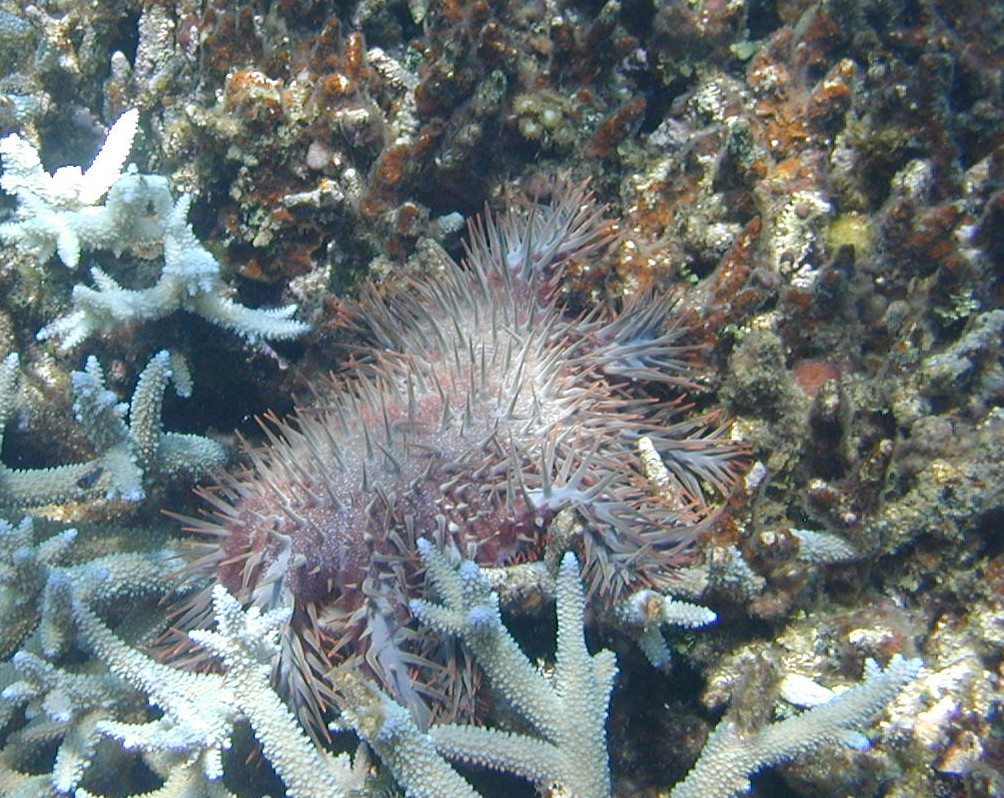
Crown-of-thorns starfish

== History ==
Fishing apparently had begun in Yabiji by 1350.

A 1697 map known as the Genroku Kuni Eu (元禄国絵図) depicted Yabiji with great precision and included its name and an explanation that its range is one and a half ri from east to west and five ri from north to south.

On May 16, 1797, the British Royal Navy sloop-of-war HMS Providence was surveying East Asia under the command of William Robert Broughton when she ran aground on a coral reef at the northwestern tip of Yabiji, flooded from the bottom, and sank. After this, nautical charts began to refer to Yabiji as "Providence Reef."

While cruising in the waters of the Miyako Islands on June 7, 1902, the Imperial Japanese Navy destroyer Shinonome ran aground in Yabiji. The protected cruisers Akashi and Saien and the destroyer Usugumo came to her assistance. Eventually refloated, she reached Sasebo, Japan on August 5, 1902.

In 1983, the Miyako Ferry company and the Hayate Company began holding tours of Yabiji in conjunction with the annual Yabiji Festival in which their ferries landed tourists on the reefs that emerged above the sea surface during low tides for several days before and after Sanitsu (March 3 on the lunar calendar, around the beginning of April in the Gregorian calendar). During these tours between 2,000 and 3,000 people landed on Yabiji's emergent reefs every year through 2014. The tourist landings faced criticism that they would lead to the devastation of the Yabiji ecosystem, and countermeasures were taken such as the pilot introduction of coral reef guides and efforts to formulate guidelines for the landings.

In response to a request from the city of Hirara (since 2005 a part of the city of Miyakojima), the Geospatial Information Authority of Japan published a 1:25,000 topographic map of Yabiji on December 1, 1999. It was the first map to color-code the coral reefs that appear above the sea surface at maximum low tide and the coral reefs that are below the sea surface. It sometimes is credited as the first topographic map in Japan that included only tidal flats, without dry land, but it also included Ikema Island and other land areas to clearly show Yabiji's geographic relationship with land areas. The creation of this map prompted the city of Hirara to choose the name "Yabiji" as the official name of the reef group in 1999 at the request of the Geospatial Information Authority of Japan.

In December 2001, Japan's Ministry of the Environment listed Yabiji as one of Japan's 500 important wetlands.

In 2008, a diving survey conducted by the Okinawa Prefectural Buried Cultural Properties Center found the remains of a foreign ship, believed to be HMS Providence. Iron ingots believed to be cargo or belongings of Providence′s crew, ceramics from China and Europe, glass bottles, and glass beads have been discovered at the shipwreck site.

On August 1, 2008, the Geospatial Information Authority of Japan published a re-edited version of the 1:25,000 topographic map of Yabiji that included Fudeiwa (フデ岩), or Fude Rock. Yabiji also is included in the 1:50,000 topographic map of northern Miyako Island.

On March 27, 2013, the Government of Japan′s Agency for Cultural Affairs recognized Yabiji as a place of great importance — an "excellent coastal scenic landscape that has been enjoyed for its connection with Miyakojima's unique lifestyle culture" and "the largest coral reef group in Japan" — and designated it as a Place of Scenic Beauty (名勝; meishō) and a Natural Monument (記念物, kinenbutsu) of Japan. In 2014, Fude Rock and its surrounding waters were added to the Yabiji natural monument.

The last landing tours of Yabiji took place in 2014. With the opening of the Irabu Ohashi Bridge between Miyako Island and Irabu Island in January 2015, both Miyako Ferries and Hayate discontinued their operation of regular ferry service between Hirara Port in Miyakojima on Miyako Island and Sarahama Port on Irabu and sold their ferries, bringing the landing tours to an end before the low-tide season of 2015.

In April 2016, the Japanese Ministry of the Environment upgraded Yabiji′s status on the list of Japan's wetlands, making it a wetlands of high importance from a biodiversity perspective.

Between 2008 and 2018, the living part of the reef decreased by an estimated 70% due to coral bleaching resulting from rising water temperatures in Yabiji.

== Access ==
Private operators conduct snorkeling and recreational diving tours of Yabiji. In addition, from April to August of each year the Hayate Company cruise ship Mont Blanc conducts tours of Yabiji about twice a month, coinciding with the emergence of some of Yabiji's reefs above the sea surface during the spring and summer tides, although landing on Yabiji during these periods is not possible.
