= Ikema Island =

Island within Ryukyu Islands

Native name: Ikyaama (池間島)
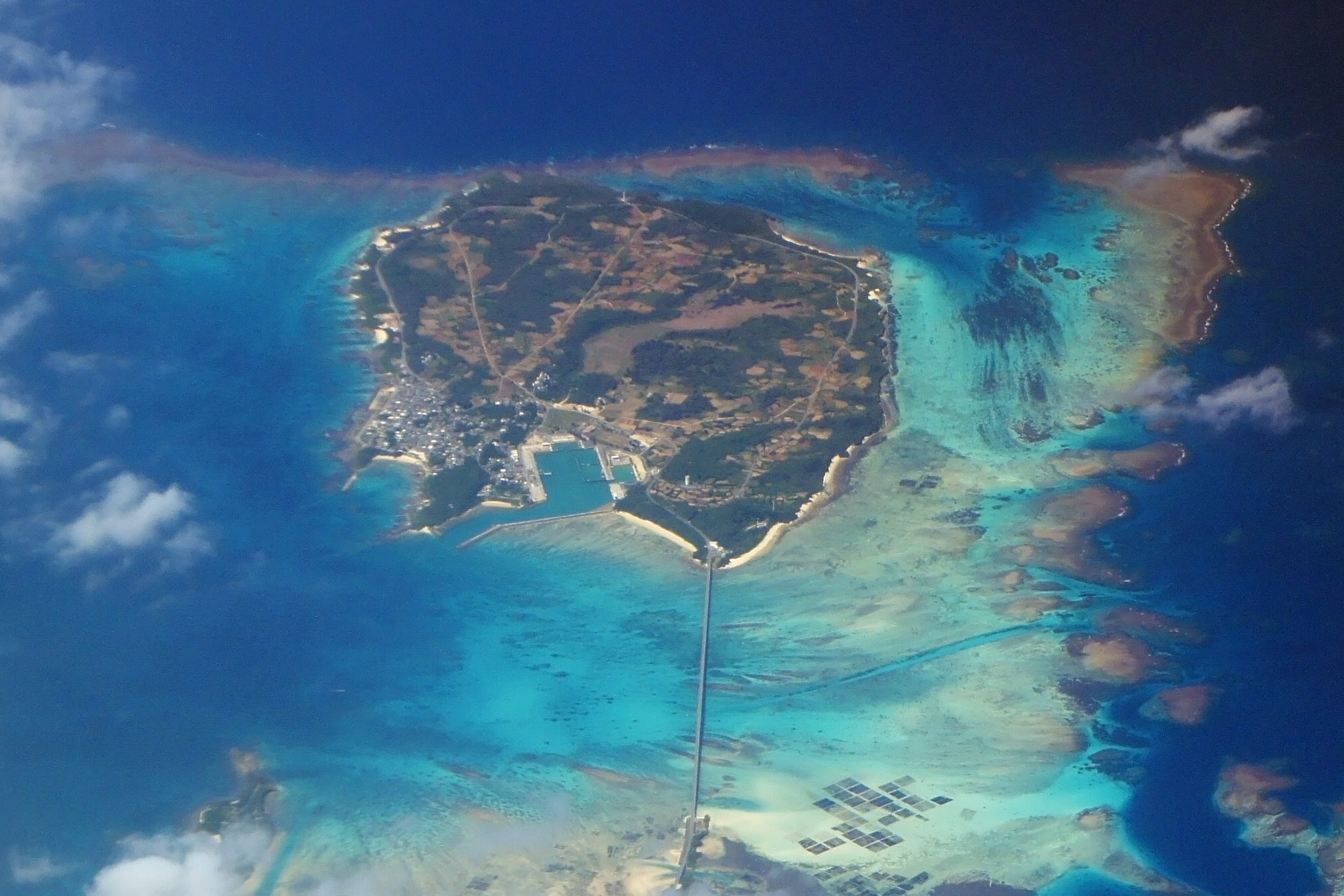
- Aerial view of Ikema-jima from southeast

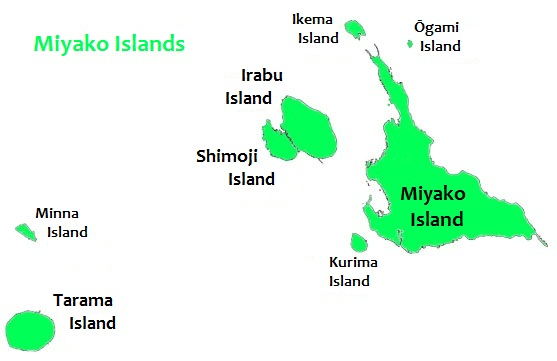
- Ikema Island is located to the north of Miyako Island

Geography
- Location: Okinawa Prefecture
- Coordinates: 24°55′N 125°15′E
- Archipelago: Miyako Islands
- Area: 2.83 km^{2} (1.09 sq mi)
- Highest elevation: 28 m (92 ft)
- Highest point: Unknown

Administration
- Japan

Demographics
- Population: 774 (2018)
- Ethnic groups: Ryukyuan, Japanese

Ikema Island (池間島, Miyako: Ikyaama), is located to the north of Miyako Island in Okinawa Prefecture, Japan. The island is connected to Miyako Island with a 1,425-metre-long (4,675 ft) bridge (池間大橋), which was completed in February 1992. There is a pond in the centre of the island. To the north-east is the Ikema-jima Block Beach (池間島ブロックビーチ). The variety of Miyakoan language spoken here is also called Ikema (Ikima in the vernacular). It is set apart from closely related language variants by its lexical word-tone system.

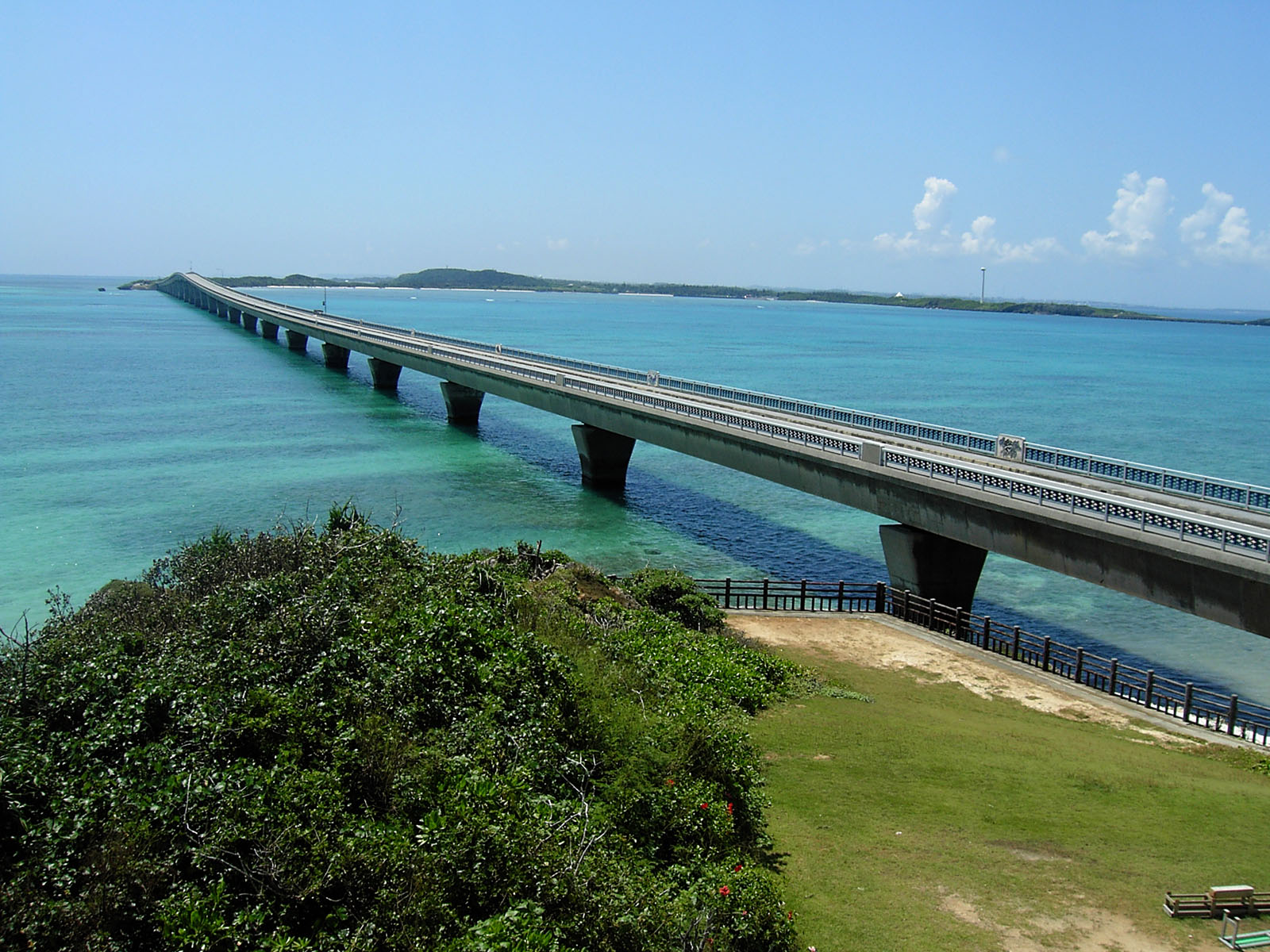
The 1,425-metre (4,675 ft) long Ikema bridge connects Ikema Island with Miyako Island.

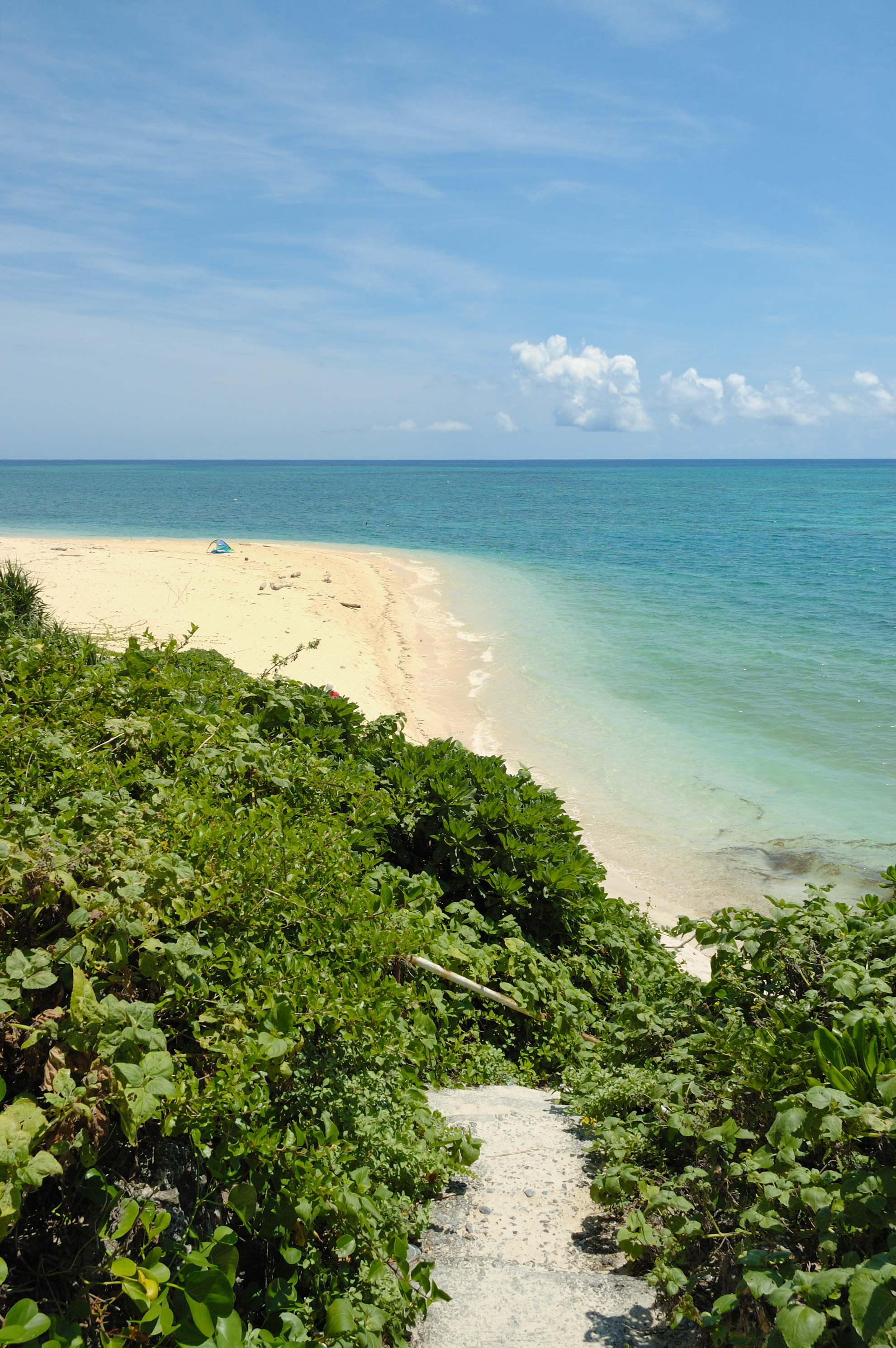
Ikemajima Block Beach

== See also ==
- Ikema Wetland
- Sakishima Beacons
