= Fuel bunker =

Container for solid fuel in ships, railway engines, or furnaces

Fuel bunkers, commonly simply known as bunkers, are containers for the storage of fuel on steam-powered boats or steam tank engines, or rooms for the storage of fuel in furnaces.

The term "bunker" or "fuel bunker" is typically only used for storage areas for solid fuels, especially coal; the term "fuel tank" is typically used for liquid fuels (such as gasoline or petrol), or gaseous fuels (such as natural gas).

== Usage ==
=== Steamships ===
For example, on the Titanic the propulsion boilers were heated by burning coal. 6,611 tons of coal were carried in its official bunkers, with a further 1,092 tons carried in Hold 3. The furnaces required over 600 tons of coal a day to be shoveled into them by hand, requiring the services of 176 firemen working around the clock.

=== Furnaces ===
Fuel oil depots built in reinforced concrete and heated with steam to maintain a minimum temperature of 140 °F and pump it to other heat exchangers in the boiler building.

== See also ==
- Coal bunker
- Bunkering
- Bunker fuel
