= Russian destroyer Pogranichnik =

WWI-era Russian destroyer

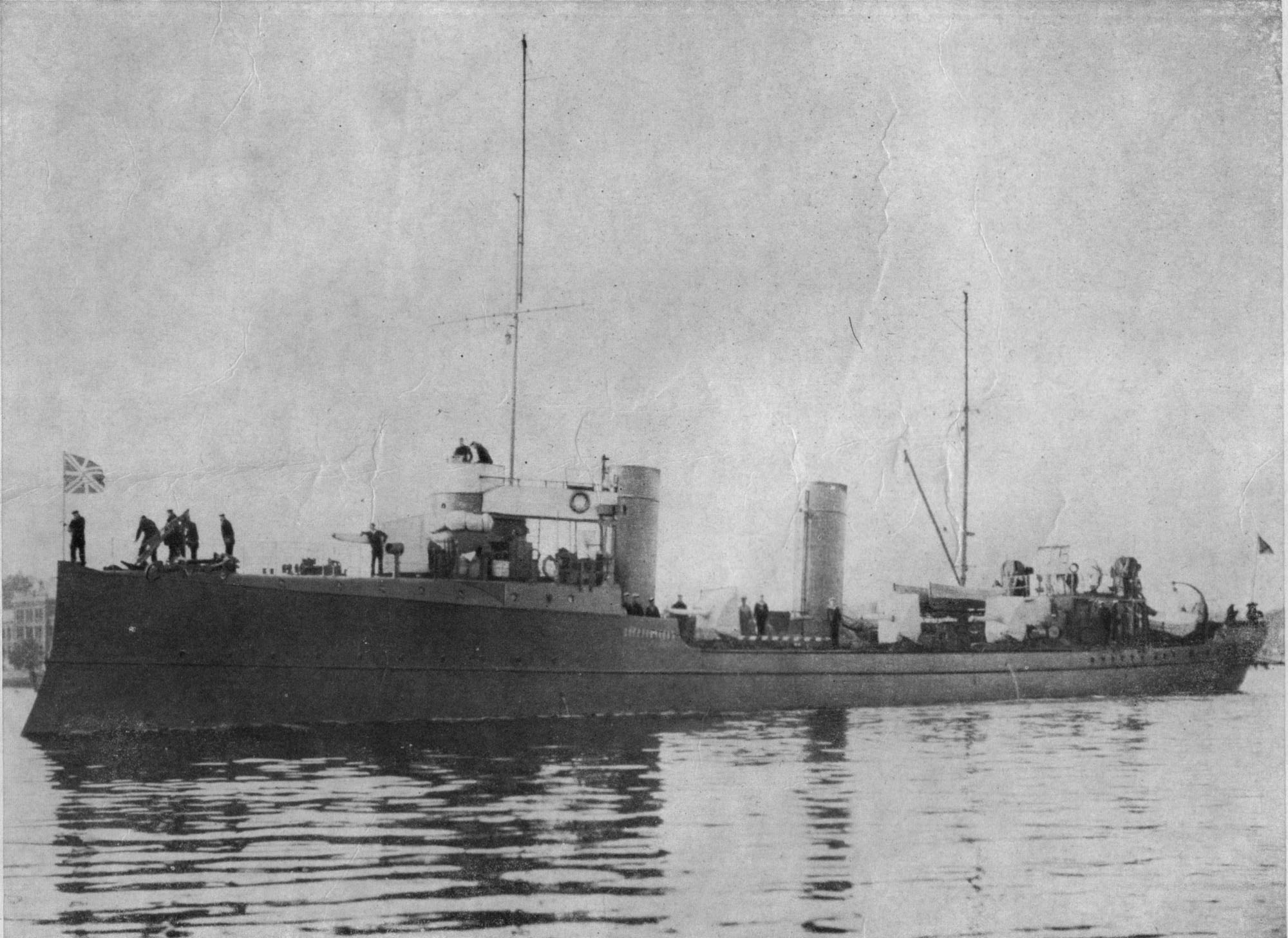

History

Russian Empire
- Name: Pogranichnik
- Builder: Wm. Crichton & Co., Abo, Grand Duchy of Finland
- Laid down: March 1905
- Launched: Early 1906
- Completed: July 1906
- Fate: Scrapped, 1924

General characteristics (as built)
- Class & type: Okhotnik-class destroyer
- Displacement: 740 t (730 long tons)
- Length: 75.18 m (246 ft 8 in)
- Beam: 8.15 m (26 ft 9 in)
- Draft: 3.51 m (11 ft 6 in) (deep load)
- Installed power: 4 Normand boilers; 7,300 ihp (5,444 kW)
- Propulsion: 2 shafts; 2 triple-expansion steam engines
- Speed: 25 knots (46 km/h; 29 mph)
- Range: 2,200–2,400 nmi (4,100–4,400 km; 2,500–2,800 mi) at 12 knots (22 km/h; 14 mph)
- Complement: 95
- Armament: 2 × single 75 mm (3 in) guns; 6 × single 57 mm (2.2 in) guns; 3 × single 450 mm (17.7 in) torpedo tubes; 41 mines

Pogranichnik (Russian: Пограничник) was a Okhotnik-class destroyer built for the Imperial Russian Navy during the first decade of the 20th century. The ship was paid for by public donations raised during the Russo-Japanese War and built by Wm. Crichton & Co. in Abo Finland and was completed in 1906. Pogranichnik was initially classed as a Torpedo Cruiser but was redesignated a destroyer in 1907. The ship served in the Baltic Fleet and participated in the First World War.

== Design and construction ==
After the outbreak of the Russo-Japanese War in 1904, large orders for destroyers were placed by the Russian Admiralty Board, with 25 destroyers being ordered from foreign shipyards and eight from Russian yards. In addition, the "Committee for the Strengthening of the Russian Fleet through Voluntary Contributions" placed orders for 18 large destroyers, in four classes, funded by donations from the Russian public. The Okhotnik-class was an improved version of the Ukraina class, which had been built in Riga and Saint Petersburg to a design by the German company AG Vulcan, but had suffered from stability problems. Contracts for four Okhotnik-class ships were placed in January 1905, with two (Pogranichnik and Okhotnik) to be built by Wm. Crichton & Co., and two (General Kondratenko and Sibirsky Strelok) to be built by Sandvikens.

The ships were 75.18 m (246 ft 8 in) long overall, 73.1 m (239 ft 10 in) at the waterline and 72.4 m (237 ft 6 in) between perpendiculars, with a beam of 8.18 m (26 ft 10 in) and a draught of 2.44 m (8 ft 0 in). Design displacement was 615 long tons (625 t), but as built displaced 750 long tons (760 t). Four coal-fired Normand boilers supplied steam to two sets of three-cylinder triple expansion engines with a total power of 7,300 ihp (5,400 kW), giving a design speed was 25 kn (29 mph; 46 km/h). Pogranichnik reached 25.48 knots (29.32 mph; 47.19 km/h) during sea trials.

The ship carried a gun armament of two 75 mm guns and six 57 mm guns and four machine guns. Torpedo armament was three 457 mm (18 inch) torpedo tubes. 41 mines could be carried. The ship was re-armed in 1910, with two 102 mm (4 in) and two 47 mm (1.9 in) guns replacing the original guns, while in 1916 an additional 102 mm gun was fitted. The ship had a crew of 95–102.

Work began on the construction of Pogranichnik in March 1905 at Chrichton's shipyard in Abo in the Grand Duchy of Finland. The ship was officially entered into the lists of the Imperial Russian Navy on 13 October 1905, and was launched in early 1906. Pogranichnik started acceptance trials in June 1906, and entered service in the Baltic Fleet in July that year.

== Service ==
Initially, Pogranichnik was classified as a Torpedo Cruiser by the Imperial Russian Navy, being larger, heavier armed and more seaworthy than the small torpedo-boat destroyers. In early 1907, as part of a major reorganisation of the Baltic Fleet, Pogranichnik, along with the other large destroyers of the Baltic Fleet, joined the 1st Division based at Liepāja, serving as a division leader. On 27 September 1907, Pogranichnik was redesignated as a destroyer. In 1911–1912, the ship was refitted at Crichton's Saint Petersburg yard, her boilers being retubed. The four destroyers of the Okhotnik-class were assigned to the Half Flotilla for Special Purposes from 1910, as they were some of the most effective destroyers in the Baltic fleet.

=== First World War ===
On 1 August 1914, as part of Russia's initial actions on the outbreak of the First World War, the Baltic fleet laid a large minefield of over 2,000 mines in the western part of the Gulf of Finland. Pogranichnik accompanied the fleet flagship Rurik during these operations. On the night of 31 October/1 November 1914, Pogranichnik, together with sister ships Okhotnik and General Kondratenko and the larger Novik were tasked to lay mines off Memel, East Prussia (now Klaipėda, Lithuania) and the coast of Courland. Heavy seas forced Novik, which was meant to lay mines in open water, to abandon the operation, but the three smaller destroyers, which were operating in more sheltered waters closer to the coast, managed to lay their field of 105 mines. The Special Half Flotilla and Novik carried out more minelaying operations on the night of 5/6 November 1914, with the four Okhotnik-class destroyers laying 140 mines off Memel and Novik 50 mines off Pillau (now Baltiysk). The minefield off Memel sank the German armoured cruiser Friedrich Carl on 17 November 1914.

On the night of 6/7 May 1915, in response to a German offensive towards Libau (now Liepāja), Pogranichnik was one of 11 Russian destroyers (Note: Novik, all four Okhotniks and six Ukraina-class destroyers.) that were ordered to lay mines off Libau, in areas that had already been swept by German minesweepers. Although there was a clash between the covering force of cruisers and the German cruiser München, the minelaying operations were undisturbed. Later that month, Pogranichnik ferried Admiral Essen, commander of the Baltic Fleet from Helsingfors (now Helsinki) to Reval (now Tallinn), where Essen died of pneumonia on 20 May, and then carried his body to Petrograd. On 25 September 1915, Pogranichnik formed part of a force which included the battleship Slava, a gunboat and seven destroyers that shelled German troops on the south coast of the Gulf of Riga. On 6 January 1916, Pogranichnik was one of six destroyers that set out to lay a minefield off Steinort, Prussia (now Gleźnowo, Poland). The operation was aborted when the destroyer Zabiyaka hit floating mines that had broken from their moorings and was damaged, with Zabiyaka being towed back to Reval by Novik.

On 22 June 1916, Pogranichnik carried the British liaison officer, Rear Admiral Richard Phillimore on a visit to Russian forces in Moon Sound. On 12 September 1916, German forces launched an operation to draw out Russian forces, particularly the battleship Slava towards to the Irbe Strait where they could be attacked by submarines and aircraft. A force of minesweepers, supported by the cruisers Augsburg, Kolberg and Strassburg advanced up the Irben Strait. In response, the Russians sent out the cruiser Diana and eight destroyers, (Note: Novik, Kapitan Izylmetev, Letun, Zabiyaka, Pogranichnik, Sibirsky Strelok, Strashny and Voiskovoy) including Pogranichnik, supported by Slava. The German submarine UB-31 made an unsuccessful torpedo attack against Diana, while an attack by four German torpedo bombers was made at too long a range and also resulted in no hits.

On 2 March 1917, most of the crew from Pogranichnik, which was berthed with the rest of her division, left the ship to take part in the February Revolution, leaving the ship manned with her officers and only a few seamen who chose to remain aboard. On 9 May 1917 the newly appointed ship's captain, Captain 2nd rank Baron N. A. Tipolt, was approached by one of his crew, who said that he had been ordered by revolutionaries to kill Tipolt. Tipolt allowed the man to leave the ship, but was then accused of collusion with a German spy by members of the ship's crew, and a resolution of no confidence in Tipolt was raised. Tipolt was replaced as captain of the ship on 10 May, allowing the ship to leave for active duty at Moonsound on 17 May 1917.

In October 1917, the Germans carried out Operation Albion, an amphibious assault to capture Ösel and Muhu islands off the coast of Estonia. Pogranichnik and General Kondratenko were the Russian duty destroyers on 12 October 1917, when the German landings began, they were sent to carry out a reconnaissance, and encountered the German torpedo boat T130 and three minesweepers in Soelo Sound. The Russian destroyers opened fire and drove the German ships back, but were themselves fired by the German cruiser Emden and forced to turn back. Later that day, the five torpedo boats of the German 13th half-flotilla (Note: S61, S63, S64, V74 and V82) advanced up Soelo Sound, and were engaged by the gunboat Grozyaschchi, which was not supported by Pogranichnik or General Kondratenko and was ordered to return to the two destroyers, allowing the German ships to break into the Kassar Weick. The large Russian destroyer Desna then came up in support, followed by four more destroyers, and the German ships withdrew to the west. On 14 October, Pogranichnik formed part of the escort for the armoured cruiser Bayan on a sortie to the Irbe Strait. During this sortie, a German submarine attacked, with a torpedo was observed to pass close to Bayan and under the stern of Pogranichnik. On 18 October, Pogranichnik and General Kondratenko were assigned to provide distant cover to shallow-draught minesweepers that were tasked with evacuating the Russian garrison from Muhu. On the afternoon that day, the Russian destroyers Zaibaikalets and Sil'nyi were laying mines off Kuivastu when they were spotted by two German torpedo boats, V180 and V184. The German torpedo boats pursued the two Russian destroyers which withdrew northwards towards Pogranichnik, General Kondratenko and the gunboat Chivinetz. Chivinetz, Pogranichnik and General Kondratenko then advanced southwards, and engaged the German torpedo boats, which turned away southwards and broke off the engagement.

On 7 November 1917, during the October Revolution, Pogranichnik joined the Bolshevik Red Fleet. The ship was laid up in reserve at Kronstadt in May 1918, and in 1924 was disarmed and sent for disposal.

== Bibliography ==
- Apalkov, Yu. V. (1996). Боевые корабли русского флота: 8.1914-10.1917г [Combat ships of the Russian fleet: 8.1914-10.1917] (in Russian). Saint Petersburg, Russia: ИНТЕК. ISBN 5-7559-0018-3.
- Berezhnoy, S.S. (2002). Крейсера и Миносцы: Справочик [Cruisers and Destroyers: A Directory] (in Russian). Moscow: Ввоенное Ииздательство. ISBN 5-203-01780-8.
- Breyer, Siegfried (1992). Soviet Warship Development: Volume 1: 1917–1937. London: Conway Maritime Press. ISBN 0-85177-604-3.
- Budzbon, Przemysław (1985). "Russia". In Gray, Randal (ed.). Conway's All the World's Fighting Ships 1906–1921. Annapolis, Maryland: Naval Institute Press. pp. 291–325. ISBN 0-85177-245-5.
- Campbell, N. J. M. (1979). "Russia". In Chesneau, Roger & Kolesnik, Eugene M. (eds.). Conway's All the World's Fighting Ships 1860–1905. New York: Mayflower Books. pp. 170–217. ISBN 0-8317-0302-4.
- Fock, Harald (1981). Schwarze Gesellen: Band 2: Zerstörer bis 1914 (in German). Herford, Germany: Koelers Verlagsgesellschaft mBH. ISBN 3-7822-0206-6.
- Fock, Harald (1989). Z-Vor! Internationale Entwicklung und Kriegseinsätze von Zerstörern und Torpedobooten 1914 bis 1939 (in German). Herford, Germany: Koehlers Verlagsgesellschaft mBH. ISBN 3-7822-0207-4.
- von Gagern, Ernst (1962). Der Krieg in der Ostsee: Dritter Band: Von Anfang 1916 bis zum Kriegsende (in German). Frankfurt: Verlag von E.S. Mittler & Sohn.
- Goldrick, James (2018). After Jutland: The Naval War in Northern European Waters, June 1916–November 1918. Barnsley, UK: Seaforth Publishing. ISBN 978-1-5267-4298-8.
- Halpern, Paul G. (1994). A Naval History of World War I. London: UCL Press. ISBN 1-85728-498-4.
- Harris, Mark (2025). The First World War in the Baltic Sea. Vol. 1: Essen's Triumph, 1914 to February 1915. Helion. ISBN 978-1-804519-10-3.
- Melnikov, R. M. (1999). Эскадренные миноносцы класса Доброволец [Volunteer-class destroyers] (in Russian). St. Petersburg: Ed. Almanac Ships & Battles. OCLC 62741262.
- Staff, Gary (2008). Battle for the Baltic Islands 1917: Triumph of the Imperial German Navy. Barnsley, UK: Pen & Sword Maritime. ISBN 9781783033188.
- Watts, Anthony J. (1990). The Imperial Russian Navy. London: Arms and Armour. ISBN 0-85368-912-1.
