= Okhotnik-class destroyer =

Early 20th-century Imperial Russian destroyer class

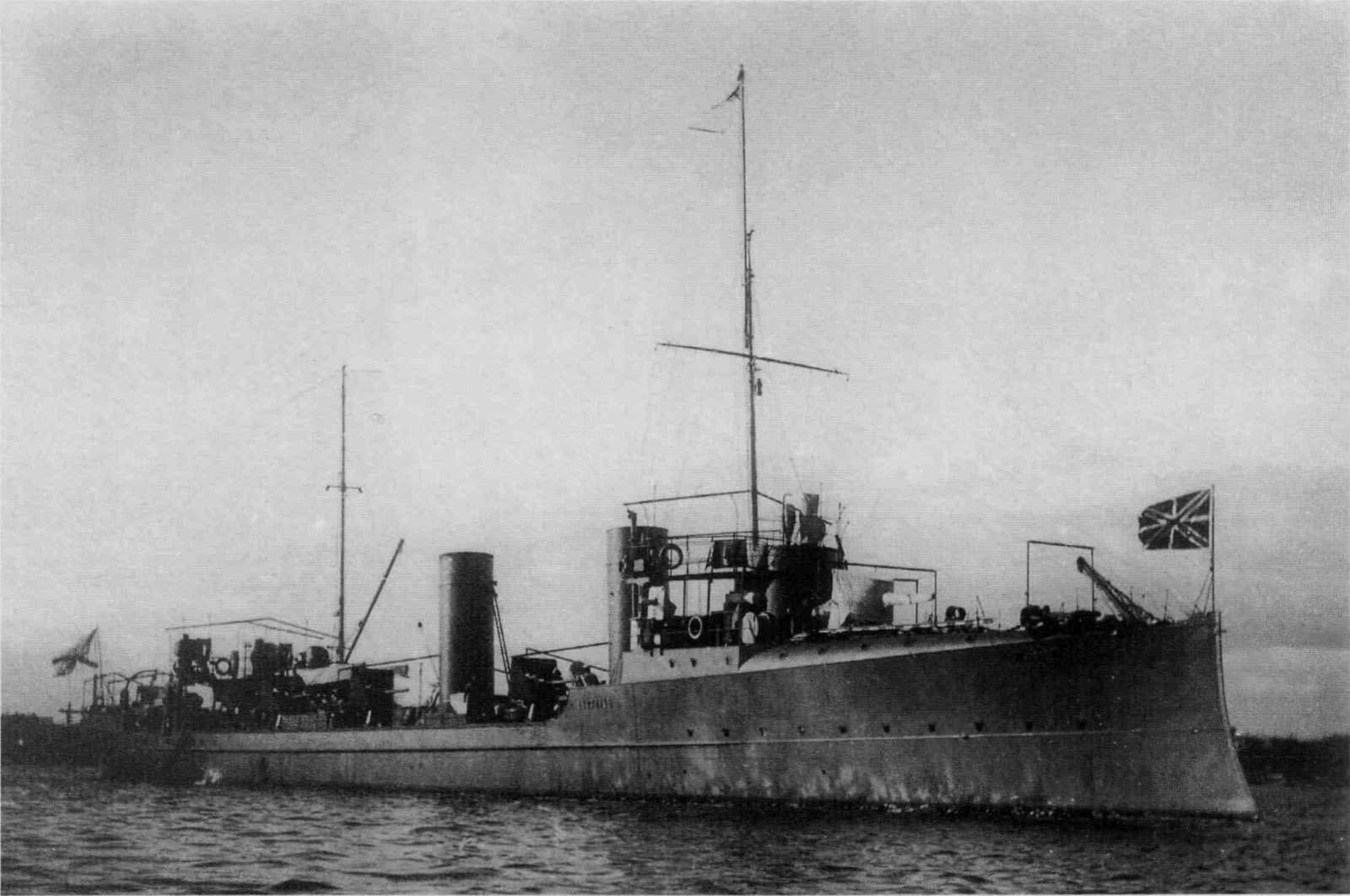
- Okhotnik

Class overview
- Operators: Imperial Russian Navy; (Russian Soviet Federative Socialist Republic) Red Fleet
- Preceded by: Gaidamak class
- Succeeded by: Novik
- Built: 1905–1907
- Completed: 4
- Lost: 1
- Scrapped: 3

General characteristics (as built)
- Type: Destroyer
- Displacement: 740–750 t (730–740 long tons)
- Length: 75.2 m (246 ft 9 in)
- Beam: 8.2 m (26 ft 11 in)
- Draft: 2.9–3 m (9 ft 6 in – 9 ft 10 in) (deep load)
- Installed power: 4 Normand boilers; 7,300 ihp (5,444 kW)
- Propulsion: 2 shafts; 2 triple-expansion steam engines
- Speed: 25 knots (46 km/h; 29 mph)
- Range: 2,200–2,400 nmi (4,100–4,400 km; 2,500–2,800 mi) at 12 knots (22 km/h; 14 mph)
- Complement: 95
- Armament: 2 × single 75 mm (3 in) gun; 6 × single 57 mm (2.2 in) guns; 4 × single 7.62 mm (0.30 in) machine guns; 3 × single 450 mm (17.7 in) torpedo tubes; 24 × mines

The Okhotnik class consisted of four destroyers built for the Imperial Russian Navy during the first decade of the 20th century. The ships served in the Baltic Fleet and participated in the First World War.

== Design and description ==
The Okhotnik-class ships were enlarged and improved versions of the preceding Ukraina class. The ships normally displaced 615 metric tons (605 long tons) and 740–750 metric tons (730–740 long tons) at full load. They measured 75.2 meters (246 ft 9 in) long overall with a beam of 8.2 meters (26 ft 11 in), and a draft of 2.9–3 meters (9 ft 6 in – 9 ft 10 in). The ships were propelled by two vertical triple-expansion steam engines, each driving one propeller shaft using steam from four Normand boilers. The engines were designed to produce a total of 7,300 indicated horsepower (5,400 kW) for an intended maximum speed of 25 knots (46 km/h; 29 mph). During the ships' sea trials, they slightly exceeded this figure. The Okhtniks normally carried 190 metric tons (187 long tons) of coal, but could carry a maximum of 210 metric tons (207 long tons). This gave them a range of 2,200–2,400 nautical miles (4,100–4,400 km; 2,500–2,800 mi) at 12 knots (22 km/h; 14 mph). Their crew numbered 95 officers and men.

The main armament of the Okhotnik class consisted of two 50-caliber 75-millimeter (3 in) guns, one gun each at the forecastle and stern. Their secondary armament included six 57-millimeter (2.2 in) guns positioned on the main deck amidships, three guns on each broadside. All of the guns were fitted with gun shields. They were also fitted with four 7.62-millimeter (0.30 in) machine guns. The ships were equipped with three 450-millimeter (17.7 in) torpedo tubes in rotating mounts. One of the single-tube mounts were located between the funnels while the other two were fore and aft of the mainmast. The destroyers could carry 24 mines.

Around 1911–1912 the ships were rearmed with a pair of 102-millimeter (4 in) Pattern 1911 Obukhov guns that replaced the 75 mm guns. All of the 57 mm guns were removed and replaced by a pair of 47-millimeter (1.9 in) guns. The destroyers may have been modified to increase their mine storage to 40–42 at this time.

== Ships ==
Construction data
Name	Laid down	Launched	Completed	Fate
Okhotnik	13 October 1905	1 August 1906	27 September 1906	Sunk by mine, 13 September 1917, raised and scrapped
General Kondratenko	18 August 1905	25 May 1906	27 September 1907	scrapped, 1925
Pogranichnik	13 October 1905	6 July 1906	27 September 1907	scrapped, 1925
Sibirsky Strelok	March 1905	6 October 1905	3 July 1906	Renamed Konstruktor, 1926, and converted into experimental ship. Scrapped, 1957

== Bibliography ==
- Apalkov, Yu. V. (1996). Боевые корабли русского флота: 8.1914-10.1917г [Combat ships of the Russian fleet: 8.1914-10.1917] (in Russian). ИНТЕК. ISBN 5-7559-0018-3.
- Berezhnoy, S.S. (2002). Крейсера и Миносцы: Справочик [Cruisers and Destroyers: A Directory] (in Russian). Ввоенное Ииздательство. ISBN 5-203-01780-8.
- Breyer, Siegfried (1992). Soviet Warship Development: Volume 1: 1917–1937. Conway Maritime Press. ISBN 0-85177-604-3.
- Budzbon, Przemysław (1985). "Russia". In Gray, Randal (ed.). Conway's All the World's Fighting Ships 1906–1921. Naval Institute Press. pp. 291–325. ISBN 0-85177-245-5.
- Campbell, N. J. M. (1979). "Russia". In Chesneau, Roger & Kolesnik, Eugene M. (eds.). Conway's All the World's Fighting Ships 1860–1905. Mayflower Books. pp. 170–217. ISBN 0-8317-0302-4.
- Halpern, Paul G. (1994). A Naval History of World War I. UCL Press. ISBN 1-85728-498-4.
- Harris, Mark (2025). The First World War in the Baltic Sea. Vol. 1: Essen's Triumph, 1914 to February 1915. Helion. ISBN 978-1-804519-10-3.
- Melnikov, R. M. (1999). Эскадренные миноносцы класса Доброволец [Volunteer-class Destroyers] (in Russian). Ed. Almanac Ships & Battles. OCLC 62741262.
- Watts, Anthony J. (1990). The Imperial Russian Navy. Arms and Armour. ISBN 0-85368-912-1.
