= Russian destroyer Turkmenets-Stavropolsky =

Imperial Russian and Soviet destroyer

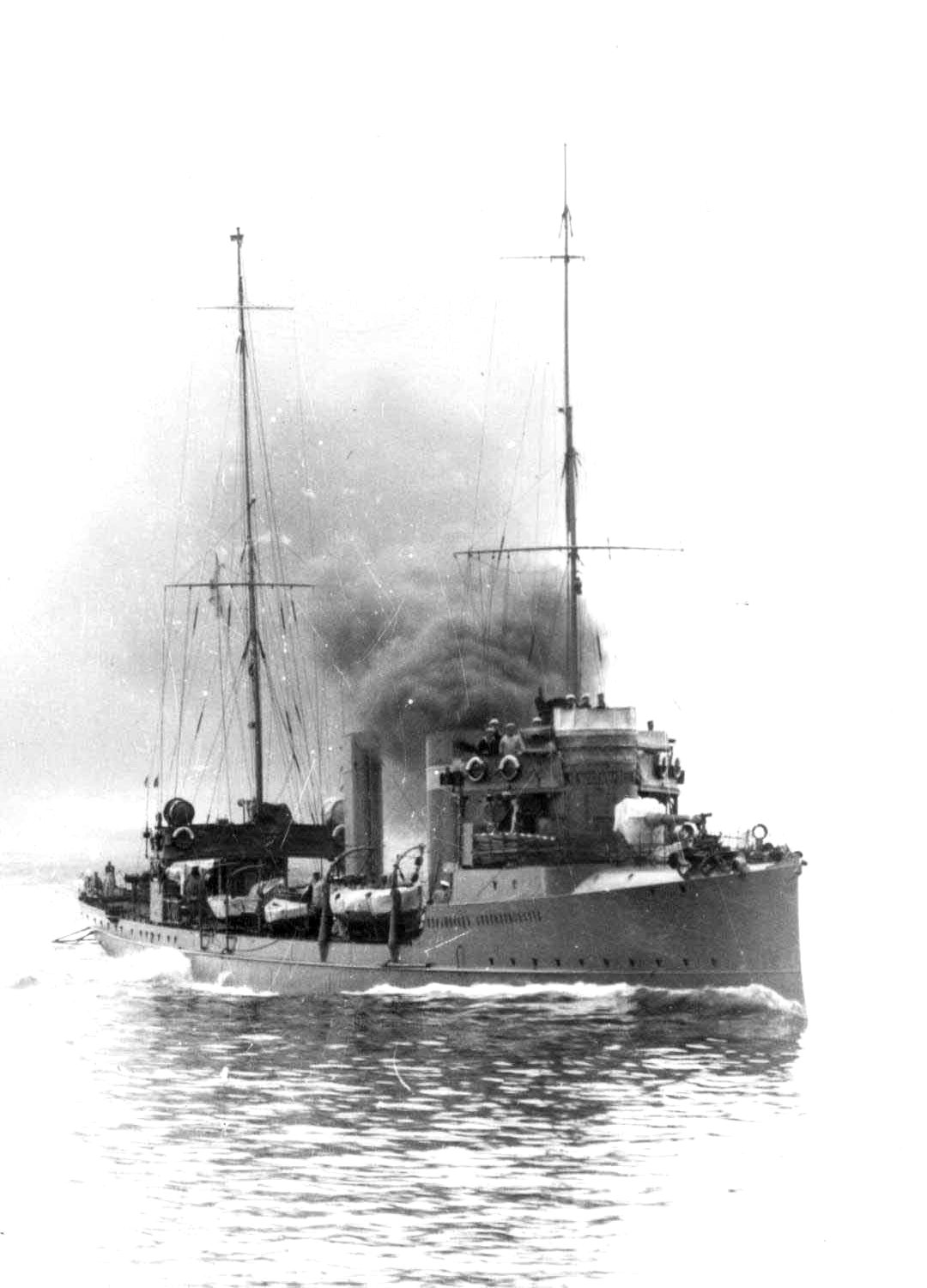
- As Turkmenets-Stavropolsky

History

Russian Empire
- Name: Trukhmenets
- Builder: Lange & Sohn, Riga, Governorate of Livonia
- Laid down: 1904
- Launched: 5 February 1905
- Completed: 1905
- Renamed: Turkmenets-Stavropolsky, 6 June 1908
- Fate: Scrapped, 30 July 1962

General characteristics (as built)
- Type: Ukraina-class destroyer
- Displacement: 730 t (720 long tons) (deep load)
- Length: 73.18 m (240 ft 1 in)
- Beam: 7.1 m (23 ft 4 in)
- Draft: 3.35 m (11 ft 0 in) (deep load)
- Installed power: 4 Normand boilers; 6,200 ihp (4,623 kW)
- Propulsion: 2 shafts; 2 triple-expansion steam engines
- Speed: 25 knots (46 km/h; 29 mph)
- Complement: 90
- Armament: 2 × single 75 mm (3 in) guns; 4 × single 57 mm (2.2 in) guns; 1 × twin, 1 × single 380 mm (15 in) torpedo tubes

Turkmenents-Stavropolsky (Russian: Туркменец-Ставропольский) was a Ukraina-class destroyer built for the Imperial Russian Navy during the first decade of the 20th century. The ship's original name was Trukhmenets (Russian: Трухменец), but she was renamed Turkmenents-Stavropolsky on 10 October 1908. Completed in 1905, the destroyer served in the Baltic Fleet and participated in the First World War.

== Design and description ==
Turkmenents-Stavropolsky normally displaced 580 metric tons (570 long tons) and 730 metric tons (720 long tons) at full load. She measured 73.18 meters (240 ft 1 in) long overall with a beam of 7.1 meters (23 ft 4 in), and a draft of 3.35 meters (11 ft 0 in). The ships were propelled by two 4-cylinder vertical triple-expansion steam engines, each driving one propeller shaft using steam from four Normand boilers. The turbines were designed to produce a total of 6,000 indicated horsepower (4,500 kW) for an intended maximum speed of 25 knots (46 km/h; 29 mph). During Turkmenents-Stavropolsky's sea trials, she reached 26.1 knots (48.3 km/h; 30.0 mph) from 6,491 ihp (4,840 kW). Her crew numbered 90 officers and men.

The main armament of the Ukraina class consisted of two 50-caliber 75-millimeter (3 in) guns, one gun each at the forecastle and stern. Their secondary armament included four 57-millimeter (2.2 in) guns positioned on the main deck amidships, two guns on each broadside. All of the guns were fitted with gun shields. Turkmenents-Stavropolsky was equipped with three 380-millimeter (15 in) torpedo tubes in two rotating mounts. The twin-tube mount was located between the middle and rear funnels while the single mount was between the aft superstructure and the rear funnel.

In 1909–1910 the ships were rearmed with a pair of 102-millimeter (4 in) Pattern 1911 Obukhov guns that replaced the 75 mm guns. All of the 57 mm guns were removed.

== Construction and career ==
Turkmenents-Stavropolsky was laid down in 1904 by Lange & Sohn at their shipyard in Riga, Governorate of Livonia, with the name of Trukhmenets and launched on 5 February 1905. She was completed later in the year and renamed in 1908.

== Bibliography ==
- Apalkov, Yu. V. (1996). Боевые корабли русского флота: 8.1914-10.1917г [Combat Ships of the Russian Fleet: 8.1914-10.1917] (in Russian). Saint Petersburg, Russia: ИНТЕК. ISBN 5-7559-0018-3.
- Berezhnoy, S.S. (2002). Крейсера и Миносцы: Справочик [Cruisers and Destroyers: A Directory] (in Russian). Moscow: Ввоенное Ииздательство. ISBN 5-203-01780-8.
- Breyer, Siegfried (1992). Soviet Warship Development: Volume 1: 1917–1937. London: Conway Maritime Press. ISBN 0-85177-604-3.
- Budzbon, Przemysław (1985). "Russia". In Gray, Randal (ed.). Conway's All the World's Fighting Ships 1906–1921. Annapolis, Maryland: Naval Institute Press. pp. 291–325. ISBN 0-85177-245-5.
- Budzbon, Przemysław; Radziemski, Jan & Twardowski, Marek (2022). Warships of the Soviet Fleets 1939–1945. Vol. I: Major Combatants. Annapolis, Maryland: Naval Institute Press. ISBN 978-1-68247-877-6.
- Campbell, N. J. M. (1979). "Russia". In Chesneau, Roger & Kolesnik, Eugene M. (eds.). Conway's All the World's Fighting Ships 1860–1905. New York: Mayflower Books. pp. 170–217. ISBN 0-8317-0302-4.
- Halpern, Paul G. (1994). A Naval History of World War I. London: UCL Press. ISBN 1-85728-498-4.
- Harris, Mark (2025). The First World War in the Baltic Sea. Vol. 1: Essen's Triumph, 1914 to February 1915. Helion. ISBN 978-1-804519-10-3.
- Melnikov, R. M. (1999). Эскадренные миноносцы класса Доброволец [Volunteer-class Destroyers] (in Russian). Saint Petersburg: Ed. Almanac Ships & Battles. OCLC 62741262.
- Watts, Anthony J. (1990). The Imperial Russian Navy. London: Arms and Armour. ISBN 0-85368-912-1.
