= Russian destroyer Okhotnik =

WWI-era Russian destroyer

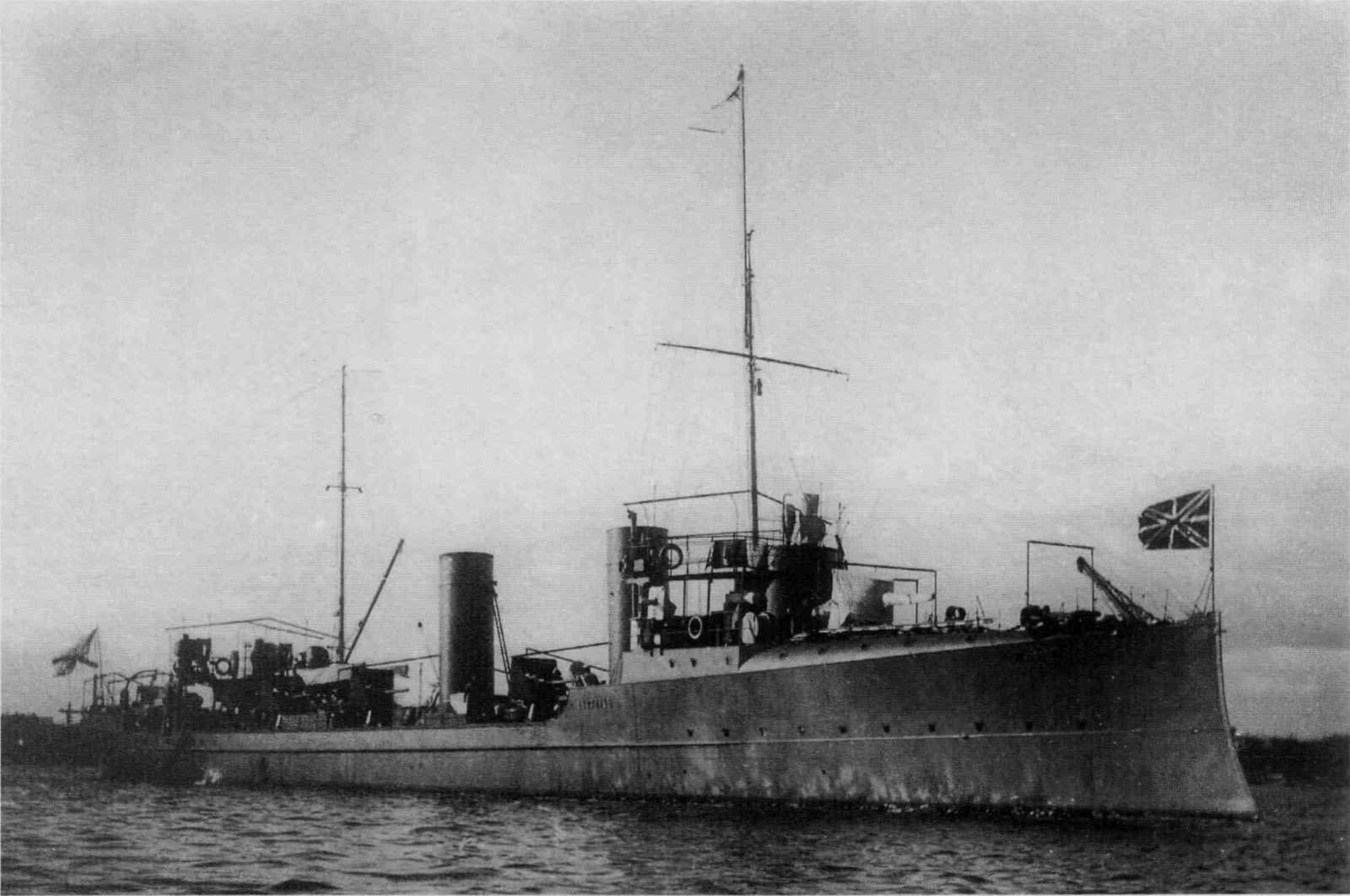

History

Russian Empire
- Name: Okhotnik
- Builder: Wm. Crichton & Co., Abo, Grand Duchy of Finland
- Laid down: 13 October 1905
- Launched: 1 August 1906
- Completed: 27 September 1907
- Fate: Sunk by mine, 13 September 1917

General characteristics (as built)
- Class & type: Okhotnik-class destroyer
- Displacement: 750 t (740 long tons)
- Length: 75.2 m (246 ft 9 in)
- Beam: 8.2 m (26 ft 11 in)
- Draft: 3 m (9 ft 10 in) (deep load)
- Installed power: 4 Normand boilers; 7,300 ihp (5,444 kW)
- Propulsion: 2 shafts; 2 triple-expansion steam engines
- Speed: 25 knots (46 km/h; 29 mph)
- Range: 2,200–2,400 nmi (4,100–4,400 km; 2,500–2,800 mi) at 12 knots (22 km/h; 14 mph)
- Complement: 95
- Armament: 2 × single 75 mm (3 in) gun; 6 × single 57 mm (2.2 in) guns; 4 × single 7.62 mm (0.30 in) machine guns; 3 × single 450 mm (17.7 in) torpedo tubes; 24 × mines

Okhotnik (Russian: Охотник) was the lead ship of her class of four destroyers built for the Imperial Russian Navy during the first decade of the 20th century. Completed in 1906, she served in the Baltic Fleet and participated in the First World War.

== Design and description ==
The Okhotnik-class ships were enlarged and improved versions of the preceding Ukraina class. The ships normally displaced 615 metric tons (605 long tons) and 750 metric tons (740 long tons) at full load. They measured 75.2 meters (246 ft 9 in) long overall with a beam of 8.2 meters (26 ft 11 in), and a draft of 3 meters (9 ft 10 in). The ships were propelled by two vertical triple-expansion steam engines, each driving one propeller shaft using steam from four Normand boilers. The engines were designed to produce a total of 7,300 indicated horsepower (5,400 kW) for an intended maximum speed of 25 knots (46 km/h; 29 mph). During Okhotnik's sea trials, she reached a speed of 25.05 knots (46.39 km/h; 28.83 mph) from 8,100 ihp (6,000 kW). The Okhtniks carried enough coal to give them a range of 2,200–2,400 nautical miles (4,100–4,400 km; 2,500–2,800 mi) at 12 knots (22 km/h; 14 mph). Their crew numbered 95 officers and men.

The main armament of the Okhotnik class consisted of two 50-caliber 75-millimeter (3 in) guns, one gun each at the forecastle and stern. Their secondary armament included six 57-millimeter (2.2 in) guns positioned on the main deck amidships, three guns on each broadside. All of the guns were fitted with gun shields. They were also fitted with four 7.62-millimeter (0.30 in) machine guns. The ships were equipped with three 450-millimeter (17.7 in) torpedo tubes in rotating mounts. One of the single-tube mounts were located between the funnels while the other two were fore and aft of the mainmast. The destroyers could carry 24 mines.

Around 1911–1912 the ships were rearmed with a pair of 102-millimeter (4 in) Pattern 1911 Obukhov guns that replaced the 75 mm guns. All of the 57 mm guns were removed and replaced by a pair of 47-millimeter (1.9 in) guns. The destroyers may have been modified to increase their mine storage to 40–42 at this time.

== Construction and career ==
Okhotnik was laid down in March 1905 by Wm. Crichton & Co. at their shipyard in Abo, Grand Duchy of Finland. The ship was launched in early 1906 and entered service on 1 August.

== Bibliography ==
- Apalkov, Yu. V. (1996). Боевые корабли русского флота: 8.1914-10.1917г [Combat ships of the Russian fleet: 8.1914-10.1917] (in Russian). ИНТЕК. ISBN 5-7559-0018-3.
- Berezhnoy, S.S. (2002). Крейсера и Миносцы: Справочик [Cruisers and Destroyers: A Directory] (in Russian). Ввоенное Ииздательство. ISBN 5-203-01780-8.
- Breyer, Siegfried (1992). Soviet Warship Development: Volume 1: 1917–1937. Conway Maritime Press. ISBN 0-85177-604-3.
- Budzbon, Przemysław (1985). "Russia". In Gray, Randal (ed.). Conway's All the World's Fighting Ships 1906–1921. Naval Institute Press. pp. 291–325. ISBN 0-85177-245-5.
- Campbell, N. J. M. (1979). "Russia". In Chesneau, Roger & Kolesnik, Eugene M. (eds.). Conway's All the World's Fighting Ships 1860–1905. Mayflower Books. pp. 170–217. ISBN 0-8317-0302-4.
- Halpern, Paul G. (1994). A Naval History of World War I. UCL Press. ISBN 1-85728-498-4.
- Harris, Mark (2025). The First World War in the Baltic Sea. Vol. 1: Essen's Triumph, 1914 to February 1915. Helion. ISBN 978-1-804519-10-3.
- Melnikov, R. M. (1999). Эскадренные миноносцы класса Доброволец [Volunteer-class Destroyers] (in Russian). Ed. Almanac Ships & Battles. OCLC 62741262.
- Watts, Anthony J. (1990). The Imperial Russian Navy. Arms and Armour. ISBN 0-85368-912-1.
