= Russian destroyer Sibirsky Strelok =

WWI-era Russian destroyer

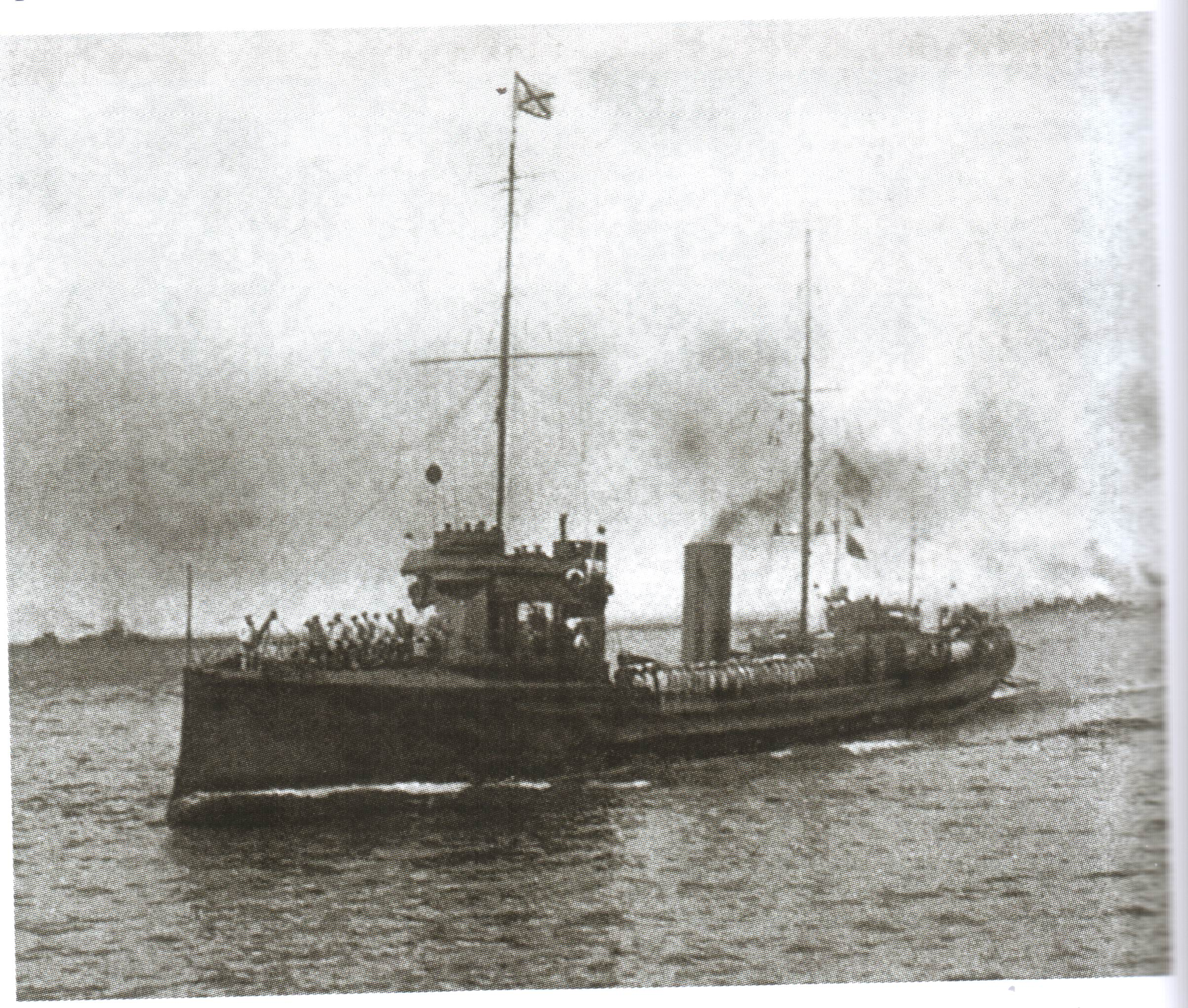

History

Russian Empire
- Name: Sibirsky Strelok
- Builder: Sandvikens Skeppsdocka och Mekaniska Verkstad, Helsingfors, Grand Duchy of Finland
- Laid down: March 1905
- Launched: 6 September 1905
- Completed: 20 June 1906
- Fate: Seized by the Bolsheviks, 25 October 1917

Soviet Union
- Acquired: 25 October 1917
- Renamed: Konstruktor, 10 December 1926; OT-29, 10 July 1956
- Reclassified: As experimental ship, 1925; As escort ship, 3 August 1941; As gunboat, 4 April 1943; As experimental ship, 3 January 1945
- Stricken: 1 June 1957
- Fate: Sunk by aircraft, 4 November 1941; Salvaged and rebuilt

General characteristics (as built)
- Displacement: 740 t (730 long tons)
- Length: 75.2 m (246 ft 9 in)
- Beam: 8.2 m (26 ft 11 in)
- Draft: 2.9 m (9 ft 6 in) (deep load)
- Installed power: 4 Normand boilers; 7,300 ihp (5,444 kW)
- Propulsion: 2 shafts; 2 triple-expansion steam engines
- Speed: 25 knots (46 km/h; 29 mph)
- Range: 2,200 nmi (4,100 km; 2,500 mi) at 12 knots (22 km/h; 14 mph)
- Complement: 95
- Armament: 2 × single 75 mm (3 in) gun; 6 × single 57 mm (2.2 in) guns; 4 × single 7.62 mm (0.30 in) machine guns; 3 × single 450 mm (17.7 in) torpedo tubes; 24 × mines

Sibirsky Strelok (Russian: Сибирский стрелок) was a Okhotnik-class destroyer built for the Imperial Russian Navy during the first decade of the 20th century. Completed in 1907, she served in the Baltic Fleet and participated in the First World War.

== Design and description ==
The Okhotnik-class ships were enlarged and improved versions of the preceding Ukraina class. The ships normally displaced 615 metric tons (605 long tons) and 740 metric tons (730 long tons) at full load. They measured 75.2 meters (246 ft 9 in) long overall with a beam of 8.2 meters (26 ft 11 in), and a draft of 2.9 meters (9 ft 6 in). The ships were propelled by two vertical triple-expansion steam engines, each driving one propeller shaft using steam from four Normand boilers. The engines were designed to produce a total of 7,300 indicated horsepower (5,400 kW) for an intended maximum speed of 25 knots (46 km/h; 29 mph). During Sibirsky Strelok's sea trials, she reached a speed of 25.48 knots (47.19 km/h; 29.32 mph) from 7,563 ihp (5,640 kW). The Okhtniks carried enough coal to give them a range of 2,200–2,400 nautical miles (4,100–4,400 km; 2,500–2,800 mi) at 12 knots (22 km/h; 14 mph). Their crew numbered 95 officers and men.

The main armament of the Okhotnik class consisted of two 50-caliber 75-millimeter (3 in) guns, one gun each at the forecastle and stern. Their secondary armament included six 57-millimeter (2.2 in) guns positioned on the main deck amidships, three guns on each broadside. All of the guns were fitted with gun shields. They were also fitted with four 7.62-millimeter (0.30 in) machine guns. The ships were equipped with three 450-millimeter (17.7 in) torpedo tubes in rotating mounts. One of the single-tube mounts were located between the funnels while the other two were fore and aft of the mainmast. The destroyers could carry 24 mines.

Around 1911–1912 the ships were rearmed with a pair of 102-millimeter (4 in) Pattern 1911 Obukhov guns that replaced the 75 mm guns. All of the 57 mm guns were removed and replaced by a pair of 47-millimeter (1.9 in) guns. The destroyers may have been modified to increase their mine storage to 40–42 at this time.

== Construction and career ==
Sibirsky Strelok was laid down in March 1905 by Sandvikens Skeppsdocka och Mekaniska Verkstad at their shipyard in Helsinki, Grand Duchy of Finland. The ship was launched on 6 September 1905 and entered service on 25 May 1906. The ship was seized by the Bolsheviks in 1917 during the October Revolution and was placed in reserve in early 1918. Sibirsky Strelok was transferred to the Special Technical Bureau (Ostekhbiuro) in 1925 as an experimental ship and was renamed Konstruktor (Russian: Конструктор) the following year. The Soviet Navy reassumed control of the ship on 31 December 1939, although her role remained the same.

Shortly after the Axis invasion of the Soviet Union in mid-1941, Konstruktor was converted into an escort ship and transferred to Lake Ladoga. She was sunk by Finnish aircraft on 4 November, but was salvaged and converted into a gunboat by 1943. The ship reverted to her experimental role in 1945. Konstructor was struck on 1 June 1957.

== Bibliography ==
- Apalkov, Yu. V. (1996). Боевые корабли русского флота: 8.1914-10.1917г [Combat ships of the Russian fleet: 8.1914-10.1917] (in Russian). ИНТЕК. ISBN 5-7559-0018-3.
- Berezhnoy, S.S. (2002). Крейсера и Миносцы: Справочик [Cruisers and Destroyers: A Directory] (in Russian). Ввоенное Ииздательство. ISBN 5-203-01780-8.
- Breyer, Siegfried (1992). Soviet Warship Development: Volume 1: 1917–1937. Conway Maritime Press. ISBN 0-85177-604-3.
- Budzbon, Przemysław (1985). "Russia". In Gray, Randal (ed.). Conway's All the World's Fighting Ships 1906–1921. Naval Institute Press. pp. 291–325. ISBN 0-85177-245-5.
- Budzbon, Przemysław; Radziemski, Jan & Twardowski, Marek (2022). Warships of the Soviet Fleets 1939–1945. Vol. I: Major Combatants. Naval Institute Press. ISBN 978-1-68247-877-6.
- Campbell, N. J. M. (1979). "Russia". In Chesneau, Roger & Kolesnik, Eugene M. (eds.). Conway's All the World's Fighting Ships 1860–1905. Mayflower Books. pp. 170–217. ISBN 0-8317-0302-4.
- Halpern, Paul G. (1994). A Naval History of World War I. UCL Press. ISBN 1-85728-498-4.
- Harris, Mark (2025). The First World War in the Baltic Sea. Vol. 1: Essen's Triumph, 1914 to February 1915. Helion. ISBN 978-1-804519-10-3.
- Melnikov, R. M. (1999). Эскадренные миноносцы класса Доброволец [Volunteer-class Destroyers] (in Russian). Ed. Almanac Ships & Battles. OCLC 62741262.
- Watts, Anthony J. (1990). The Imperial Russian Navy. Arms and Armour. ISBN 0-85368-912-1.
