= Russian destroyer Zaibaikalets =

Imperial Russian and Soviet destroyer

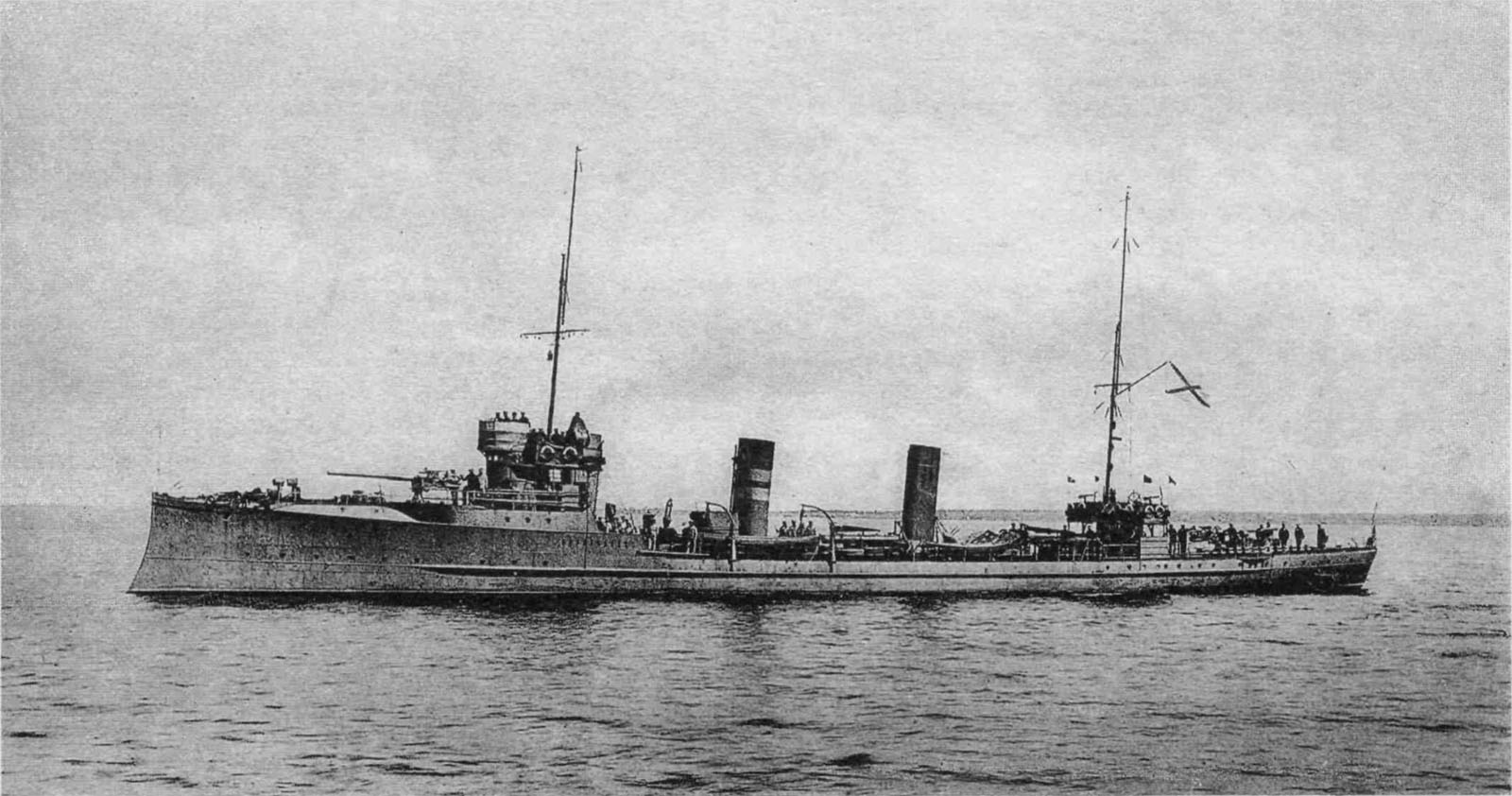

History

Russian Empire
- Name: Zaibaikalets
- Builder: Lange & Sohn, Riga, Governorate of Livonia
- Laid down: July 1904
- Launched: 14 April 1906
- Completed: 1906
- Fate: Scrapped, 1923

General characteristics
- Class & type: Ukraina-class destroyer
- Displacement: 720 t (710 long tons) (deep load)
- Length: 73.05 m (239 ft 8 in)
- Beam: 7.24 m (23 ft 9 in)
- Draft: 3.35 m (11 ft) (deep load)
- Installed power: 4 Normand boilers; 6,200 ihp (4,623 kW)
- Propulsion: 2 shafts; 2 triple-expansion steam engines
- Speed: 25 knots (46 km/h; 29 mph)
- Complement: 90
- Armament: 2 × single 75 mm (3 in) gun; 4 × single 57 mm (2.2 in) guns; 2 × single 450 mm (17.7 in) torpedo tubes

Zaibaikalets (Russian: Забайкалец) was a Ukraina-class destroyer built for the Imperial Russian Navy during the first decade of the 20th century. Completed in 1906, she served in the Baltic Fleet and participated in the First World War.

== Design and description ==
Zaibaikalets normally displaced 580 metric tons (570 long tons) and 720 metric tons (710 long tons) at full load. She measured 73.05 meters (239 ft 8 in) long overall with a beam of 7.24 meters (23 ft 9 in), and a draft of 3.35 meters (11 ft). The ships were propelled by two 4-cylinder vertical triple-expansion steam engines, each driving one propeller shaft using steam from four Normand boilers. The turbines were designed to produce a total of 6,000 indicated horsepower (4,500 kW) for an intended maximum speed of 25 knots (46 km/h; 29 mph). During Zaibaikalets's sea trials, she reached 26.46 knots (49.00 km/h; 30.45 mph) from 6,390 ihp (4,770 kW). Her crew numbered 90 officers and men.

The main armament of the Ukraina class consisted of two 50-caliber 75-millimeter (3 in) guns, one gun each at the forecastle and stern. Their secondary armament included four 57-millimeter (2.2 in) guns positioned on the main deck amidships, two guns on each broadside. All of the guns were fitted with gun shields. Zaibaikalets was equipped with two 450-millimeter (17.7 in) torpedo tubes in two rotating mounts. The forward mount was located between the middle and rear funnels while the rear mount was between the aft superstructure and the rear funnel.

In 1909–1910 the ships were rearmed with a pair of 102-millimeter (4 in) Pattern 1911 Obukhov guns that replaced the 75 mm guns. All of the 57 mm guns were removed.

== Construction and career ==
Zaibaikalets was laid down in 1905 by Lange & Sohn at their shipyard in Riga, Governorate of Livonia, and launched on 14 April 1906. She was completed on 19 July.

== Bibliography ==
- Apalkov, Yu. V. (1996). Боевые корабли русского флота: 8.1914-10.1917г [Combat Ships of the Russian Fleet: 8.1914-10.1917] (in Russian). Saint Petersburg, Russia: ИНТЕК. ISBN 5-7559-0018-3.
- Berezhnoy, S.S. (2002). Крейсера и Миносцы: Справочик [Cruisers and Destroyers: A Directory] (in Russian). Moscow: Ввоенное Ииздательство. ISBN 5-203-01780-8.
- Breyer, Siegfried (1992). Soviet Warship Development: Volume 1: 1917–1937. London: Conway Maritime Press. ISBN 0-85177-604-3.
- Budzbon, Przemysław (1985). "Russia". In Gray, Randal (ed.). Conway's All the World's Fighting Ships 1906–1921. Annapolis, Maryland: Naval Institute Press. pp. 291–325. ISBN 0-85177-245-5.
- Campbell, N. J. M. (1979). "Russia". In Chesneau, Roger & Kolesnik, Eugene M. (eds.). Conway's All the World's Fighting Ships 1860–1905. New York: Mayflower Books. pp. 170–217. ISBN 0-8317-0302-4.
- Halpern, Paul G. (1994). A Naval History of World War I. London: UCL Press. ISBN 1-85728-498-4.
- Harris, Mark (2025). The First World War in the Baltic Sea. Vol. 1: Essen's Triumph, 1914 to February 1915. Helion. ISBN 978-1-804519-10-3.
- Melnikov, R. M. (1999). Эскадренные миноносцы класса Доброволец [Volunteer-class Destroyers] (in Russian). Saint Petersburg: Ed. Almanac Ships & Battles. OCLC 62741262.
- Watts, Anthony J. (1990). The Imperial Russian Navy. London: Arms and Armour. ISBN 0-85368-912-1.
