= Ukraina-class destroyer =

Early 20th-century Imperial Russian destroyer class

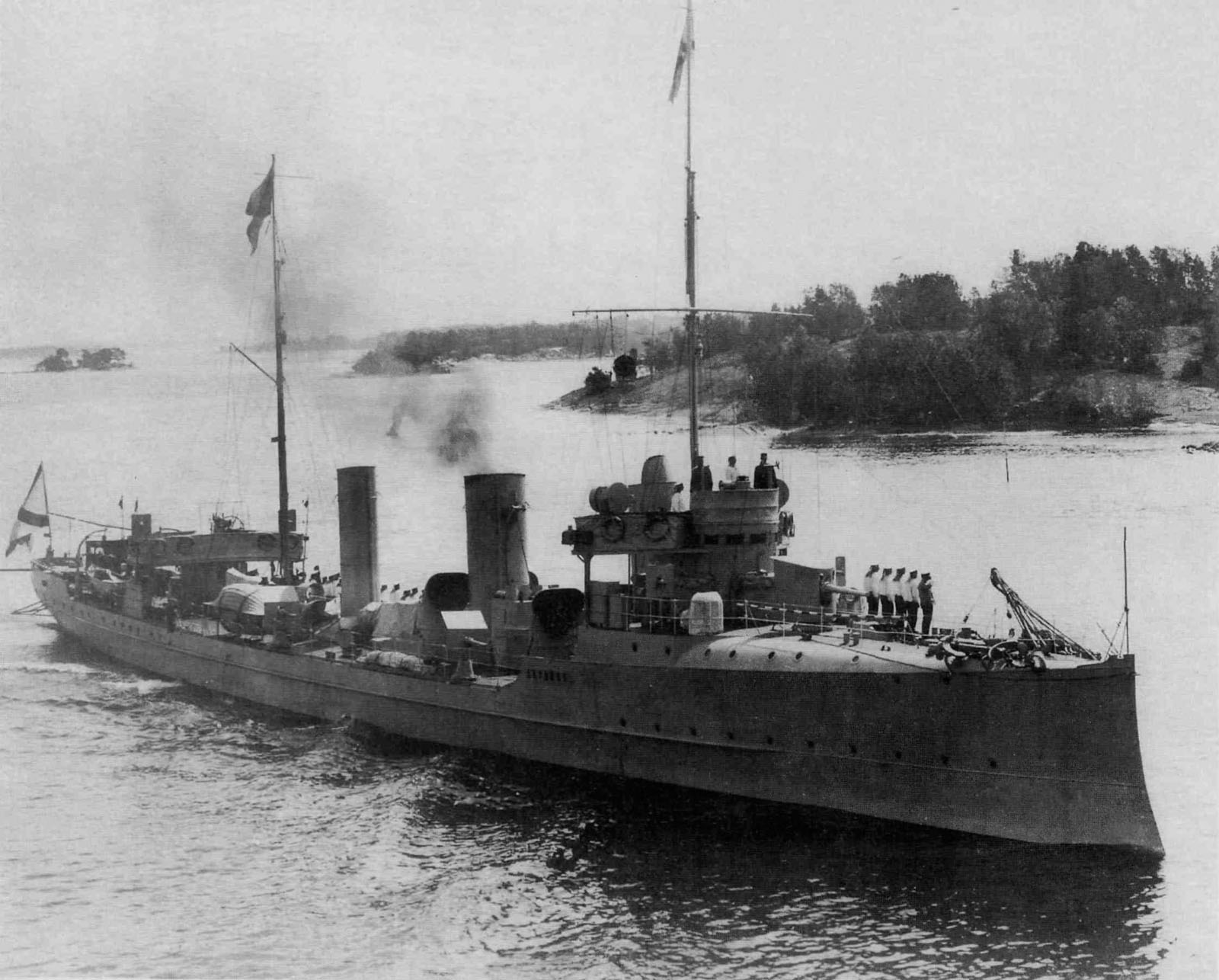
- Ukraina

Class overview
- Builders: Lange & Sohn, Riga, Governorate of Livonia
- Operators: Imperial Russian Navy; (Russian Soviet Federative Socialist Republic) Red Fleet
- Succeeded by: Emir Bukharsky class
- Built: 1904–1906
- In commission: 1905–1949
- Completed: 8
- Lost: 1
- Scrapped: 7

General characteristics (as built)
- Type: Ukraina-class destroyer
- Displacement: 700–732 t (689–720 long tons) (deep load)
- Length: 73.05–73.18 m (239 ft 8 in – 240 ft 1 in)
- Beam: 7.2–7.24 m (23 ft 7 in – 23 ft 9 in)
- Draft: 3.2–3.35 m (10 ft 6 in – 11 ft 0 in) (deep load)
- Installed power: 4 Normand boilers; 6,200 ihp (4,623 kW)
- Propulsion: 2 shafts; 2 triple-expansion steam engines
- Speed: 25 knots (46 km/h; 29 mph)
- Complement: 90
- Armament: 2 × single 75 mm (3 in) guns; 4 × single 57 mm (2.2 in) guns; 3 × 381 mm (15 in) or 2 × 450 mm (17.7 in) torpedo tubes

The Ukraina class (Russian: Украйна) consisted of eight destroyers built for the Imperial Russian Navy during the first decade of the 20th century. They served in the Baltic Fleet and participated in the First World War.

== Design and description ==
The Ukraina-class ships normally displaced 580 metric tons (570 long tons) and 700–732 metric tons (689–720 long tons) at full load. They measured 73.05–73.18 meters (239 ft 8 in – 240 ft 1 in) long overall with a beam of 7.1–7.24 meters (23 ft 4 in – 23 ft 9 in), and a draft of 3.2–3.35 meters (10 ft 6 in – 11 ft 0 in). The ships were propelled by two 4-cylinder vertical triple-expansion steam engines, each driving one propeller shaft using steam from four Normand boilers. The turbines were designed to produce a total of 6,000 indicated horsepower (4,500 kW) for an intended maximum speed of 25 knots (46 km/h; 29 mph). During the ships' sea trials, they generally exceeded this figure, reaching 26–26.95 knots (48.15–49.91 km/h; 29.92–31.01 mph). Their crew numbered 90 officers and men.

The main armament of the Ukraina class consisted of two 50-caliber 75-millimeter (3 in) guns, one gun each at the forecastle and stern. Their secondary armament included four 57-millimeter (2.2 in) guns positioned on the main deck amidships, two guns on each broadside. All of the guns were fitted with gun shields. The first four ships (Ukraina, Voiskovoy, Turkmenets-Stavropolsky, and Kazanets) were equipped with three 380-millimeter (15 in) torpedo tubes in two rotating mounts. The twin-tube mount was located between the middle and rear funnels while the single mount was between the aft superstructure and the rear funnel. The other four ships substituted single 450-millimeter (17.7 in) tubes in the same locations.

In 1909–1910 the ships were rearmed with a pair of 102-millimeter (4 in) Pattern 1911 Obukhov guns that replaced the 75 mm guns. All of the 57 mm guns were removed.

== Ships ==
Construction data
Name	Laid down	Launched	Entered Service	Fate
Ukraina	1904	21 September 1904	1905	Sunk as a target, July 1961
Voiskovoy	1904	13 November 1904	1905	Scrapped, 28 June 1958
Turkmenets-Stavropolsky	1904	5 February 1905	1905	Scrapped, 30 July 1962
Kazanets	1904	28 April 1905	1906	Sunk by German submarine UC-27, 15 October 1916
Steregushchiy	July 1904	21 June 1905	1906	Scrapped, 1924
Strashny	1 July 1904	23 December 1905	1906	Scrapped, 1924
Donskoi Kazak	July 1904	25 February 1906	1906	Scrapped, 1924
Zaibaikalets	July 1904	14 April 1906	1906	Scrapped, 1923

== Bibliography ==
- Apalkov, Yu. V. (1996). Боевые корабли русского флота: 8.1914-10.1917г [Combat ships of the Russian fleet: 8.1914-10.1917] (in Russian). Saint Petersburg, Russia: ИНТЕК. ISBN 5-7559-0018-3.
- Berezhnoy, S.S. (2002). Крейсера и Миносцы: Справочик [Cruisers and Destroyers: A Directory] (in Russian). Moscow: Ввоенное Ииздательство. ISBN 5-203-01780-8.
- Breyer, Siegfried (1992). Soviet Warship Development: Volume 1: 1917–1937. London: Conway Maritime Press. ISBN 0-85177-604-3.
- Budzbon, Przemysław (1985). "Russia". In Gray, Randal (ed.). Conway's All the World's Fighting Ships 1906–1921. Annapolis, Maryland: Naval Institute Press. ISBN 0-85177-245-5.
- Budzbon, Przemysław; Radziemski, Jan & Twardowski, Marek (2022). Warships of the Soviet Fleets 1939–1945. Vol. I: Major Combatants. Annapolis, Maryland: Naval Institute Press. ISBN 978-1-68247-877-6.
- Campbell, N. J. M. (1979). "Russia". In Chesneau, Roger & Kolesnik, Eugene M. (eds.). Conway's All the World's Fighting Ships 1860–1905. New York: Mayflower Books. pp. 170–217. ISBN 0-8317-0302-4.
- Halpern, Paul G. (1994). A Naval History of World War I. London: UCL Press. ISBN 1-85728-498-4.
- Harris, Mark (2025). The First World War in the Baltic Sea. Vol. 1: Essen's Triumph, 1914 to February 1915. Helion. ISBN 978-1-804519-10-3.
- Melnikov, R. M. (1999). Эскадренные миноносцы класса Доброволец [Volunteer-class destroyers] (in Russian). St. Petersburg: Ed. Almanac Ships & Battles. OCLC 62741262.
- Watts, Anthony J. (1990). The Imperial Russian Navy. London: Arms and Armour. ISBN 0-85368-912-1.
